= List of accidents and incidents involving military aircraft (1960–1969) =

The accidents and incidents listed here are grouped by the year in which they occurred. Not all of the aircraft were in operation at the time. For more exhaustive lists, see the Aircraft Crash Record Office, the Air Safety Network, or the Dutch Scramble Website Brush and Dustpan Database. Combat losses are not included, except for a very few cases denoted by singular circumstances.

In the 1961 list of accidents, make the following correction to the March 14, 1961 Yuba City crash. Change the middle sentence to:

"The bomber subsequently crashed, but all 8 crew members successfully bailed out and survived the crash."

== Aircraft terminology ==
Information on aircraft gives the type, and if available, the serial number of the operator in italics, the constructors number, also known as the manufacturer's serial number (c/n), exterior codes in apostrophes, nicknames (if any) in quotation marks, flight callsign in italics, and operating units.

== 1960 ==
4 January
Three United States Army de Havilland Canada U-1A Otters, of the 329th Engineer Detachment, flew from Wheelus Air Base to Bengazi, Libya, but 55-2974 disappeared over the Gulf of Sirte in the Mediterranean in a storm Prague. Aircraft never found. Search suspended 8 January at 2030 hrs. One crew and nine passengers presumed dead. Lost were:
1st Lt. Walter Jefferson, Jr., pilot of the aircraft, Tulsa, Okla;
2d Lt. Graydon W. Goss, Franklinville, N.Y.;
Pfc Albert L. Callais, Plaquemine, La.:
Sp5 Donnald R. Fletcher, Salinas, Calif.;
Sp4 Henry Harvey, Bradenton, Fla.;
Sp4 George W. Hightower, Waskum, Tex.;
Pfc Stephen T. Novak, Massena, NY;
Sp4 William C. Riley, North Adams, Mass;
Sfc Kenneth E. Spaulding, The Bronx;, NY
Pfc Henry J. Weyer, Jr., Chicago., Ill.

25 February
United States Navy Douglas R6D-1, BuNo 131582, flying from Buenos Aires – Ezeiza to Galeão International Airport/Galeão Air Force Base collided in mid-air over Guanabara Bay near Sugarloaf Mountain with a Real Transportes Aéreos Douglas DC-3, registration PP-AXD, flying from Campos dos Goytacazes to Rio de Janeiro – Santos Dumont Airport. Of the 38 occupants of the American aircraft, 3 survived. All 26 passengers and crew of the Brazilian aircraft died.

26 February
A Lockheed F-104C Starfighter, 56-0905, of the 436th Tactical Fighter Squadron, 479th Tactical Fighter Wing, hit a mountain 7 NM NNE of airfield during a night approach for landing at Nellis AFB, Nevada.

5 March
Late pre-production English Electric Lightning F.1, XG334 of the Air Fighting Development Squadron, RAF Coltishall, Norfolk, aircraft 'A', crashed near Wells-next-the-Sea after suffering complete hydraulic failure, resulting in loss of all control-surface power and hydraulic services. The pilot, Sqn. Leader Harding, ejected safely, descending near Syderstone, in North Norfolk. Total flights 34, hours flown 23 h 35 min. This was the first loss of the type. Extensive sea search around Roaring Middle Light failed to find any trace of the missing Lightning.

5 March
A Fairchild C-119G Flying Boxcar, 53-8152A of the 12th Troop Carrier Squadron, 322d Air Division, Dreux Air Base, France, departed Adana, Turkey with 3 crew, 15 passengers and 7,614 lb of cargo, made a fueling stop at Athens, Greece, departing at 1600 hrs. for Naples, Italy. Two hours into an expected 3:02 flight, the port engine began to overspeed. Attempts to cut off and/or feather the propeller failed and the aircraft lost altitude. The pilot electet to shut down the engine by turning off the fire wall shut off. The engine stopped, but the propeller shaft sheared with the propeller windmilling at an increased rate. The aircraft began to descend at a rate of 500 feet per minute. Realizing that the aircraft would not reach the chosen emergency airfield at Crotone, Italy, the pilot circled over the small town of Botricello, ordering the passengers and radio operator to bail out – all landed safely with only minor injuries. Pilot Harold Cliffton Hardesty and co-pilot Harry Francis Dawley, Jr. then landed the C-119 on the nearby beach at 1830 (dusk) with gear down, full flaps, landing light on, with an approach speed of 120 kn and touch-down at 90 kn. The roll out was straight for 800-1,000 feet before the C-119 veered to the right and into the water, with the cockpit filling to about the level of the side window. The two crew evacuated through the top hatch, slid off the left wing and swam ashore. Although the plane had stopped basically intact, wave action overnight destroyed the airframe.

12 March
A Boeing B-47E Stratojet, 52-1414, of the 545th Bomb Squadron, 384th Bomb Wing, became over-stressed, exploding in mid-air over Little Rock, Arkansas at ~0645 hrs., debris falling on neighborhoods of the city, setting many houses afire. Only the co-pilot, Lt. Thomas G. Smoak, 26, survived, parachuting after being thrown clear of the explosion; two other crew and a passenger died, plus two civilians on the ground. The dead crewmen were Capt. Herbert Aldridge, 37, aircraft commander; Lt. Col. Reynolds S. Watson, 43, navigator, and S/Sgt. Kenneth E. Brose, 25 (passenger). Civilian victims were Mrs. Andrew L. Clark, 62, who was alone in her home at 211 Colonial Court, where a major portion of the plane fell, and James LaRoy Hollabaugh, 29, adopted son of Mrs. Agnes Nilsson Grove of 1920 Maryland Avenue. Both of those houses were destroyed by fire but Mrs. Grove escaped with burns on her feet and abrasions on her legs. "Smoak came to rest entangled in a tree behind the house at 509 Midland Street. He spoke rationally to rescuers who had watched his parachute fall but was in a severe shock. He received emergency treatment on the spot from a physician who lived in the neighborhood, and he was taken to Arkansas Baptist Hospital. His wife was a nurse at Arkansas Children's Hospital, two blocks from the Maryland – Summit crash scene. The scene of the heaviest destruction to property was at the intersection of Maryland and Summit Avenues. Two homes, that of Mrs. Marie Milligan at 824 Summit and that of Mrs. Grove, and an apartment building of three units on the southeast corner, were destroyed by fire."

18 March
Lockheed F-104C Starfighter, 56-0917, of the 436th Tactical Fighter Squadron, 479th Tactical Fighter Wing based at George Air Force Base, California, disappeared shortly after takeoff approximately 10 miles north of Kindley AFB, Bermuda. No trace of the aircraft or pilot 1st Lt. Morris Ballard Larsen is found despite a 6-day air and sea search. The cause of the accident remains undetermined. This accident occurred during a planned deployment from George AFB to Moron AB, Spain, with refueling stop at Bermuda. A squadron of eighteen F-104C aircraft was scheduled to leave Kindley AFB, Bermuda for Moron AB, Spain at 0630 hours. The first flight of 6 aircraft, including Lt. Larson, took off with numbers 1 thru 4 in left echelon and numbers 5 and 6 in element 500 ft. behind. Lt. Larson was number 4. All members of the flight were monitoring channel 17, radar departure frequency, and checked in on that freq. prior to takeoff. Take-off in elements appeared normal except Lt. Larson lagged behind perceptibly and after becoming airborne assumed a steep climb attitude and disappeared into the overcast before the element leader. Lt. Larson radioed that his landing gear had not fully retracted after takeoff and that he had slowed down and recycled the gear. During this time he separated from his element leader. Shortly later Lt. Larson radioed that his gear was up. Just after this transmission all radio and radar contact was lost with Lt. Larson. Repeated attempts to contact Lt. Larson on guard and radar departure channels were unsuccessful. Element lead immediately requested Air Sea Rescue and a helicopter dispatched to the last radar contact of approximately 10 miles north of Kindley AFB. A search of the area failed to find any evidence of a crash or survivor. Weather in the vicinity of last radar contact was 300 ft and 1 mile in rain showers; 500 ft and 3 to 4 miles outside rain showers with a ragged ceiling. Radar surveillance of the area gave no indication he was airborne in the area. A T-33 and F-100C were scrambled to search at high altitude for possible contrails and to establish visual contact with an aircraft squawking emergency. This emergency squawk was identified as a Navy P5M Flying Boat. No contrails were discovered at altitude.

4 April
A U.S. Air Force North American F-100D Super Sabre, 56-2994, of the 77th Tactical Fighter Squadron, 20th Tactical Fighter Wing, based at Wethersfield, Essex, crashed into mud flats at the Holbeach Range in eastern England, killing pilot 1st Lt. Thomas R. Winsford. A cause for the crash was never clearly determined.

13–14 April
A Royal Canadian Navy Grumman CS2F Tracker of squadron VU-32, flown by pilot LCdr Les Rosenthall and co-pilot S/Lt Jerry McGreevy and carrying maintenance technicians PO Beakley, LS Hodge, and PO Jerry Ryan as passengers, departed from naval air station HMCS Shearwater, Nova Scotia, Canada, at 1700 hours on 13 April, due to fly southwards across the western Atlantic Ocean and arrive in Bermuda at 2200 hours. Crew was unable to pick up clear signal from a ship-based intermediate navigational radio beacon, but they chose to continue, as back bearing to Shearwater beacon indicated they were on the correct course; however, the crew was subsequently unable to pick up a signal from Bermuda-based beacon, and wandered off course far enough that fuel supply became insufficient to reach the island. The crew elected to ditch, performed a descent in instrument conditions, touched down safely, and evacuated the aircraft with minor injuries to Rosenthall only, but they were forced to lash two small auxiliary life rafts together after a primary six-person raft was dragged down by the sinking aircraft. The five occupants were located by a United States Coast Guard Martin P5M Marlin at 0135 hours on 14 April, but conditions inhibited safe rescue by air. They were not rescued until they were reached by a civilian motor vessel at 1130 hours, roughly 11 hours after touching down. This was the first successful night ditching of a CS2F or S2F (later S-2) Tracker.

15 April
Twenty-four airmen escaped with their lives when a Boeing KC-97G Stratofreighter, 52-0919, of the 307th Air Refueling Squadron, 307th Bomb Wing, crashed and burned on takeoff from Lincoln AFB, Nebraska, when the undercarriage collapsed. The only casualties were two airmen who suffered leg fractures and five others who suffered minor cuts and burns.

18 April
U.S. Air Force Douglas C-124C Globemaster II 52-1062 crashed into a 450 ft (137 m) hillside after taking off in heavy fog from Stephenville-Harmon Air Force Base, Newfoundland and Labrador, Canada, killing all 9 on board.

1 May
A CIA Lockheed U-2A, 56-6693, Article 360, flown by Francis Gary Powers was shot down by a SA-2 (Guideline) missile near Degtyarsk in the Soviet Union during an overflight codenamed Operation GRAND SLAM, the twenty-fourth and most ambitious deep-penetration flight of the U-2 program. Powers parachuted down and was captured. Soviet Premier Nikita Khrushchev announced on 7 May to the Supreme Soviet of the Soviet Union, and thus the world, that a "spyplane" had been shot down but intentionally made no reference to the pilot. Powers was later produced in a 'show trial'. On 10 February 1962, twenty-one months after his capture, Powers was exchanged along with American student Frederic Pryor in a spy swap for Soviet KGB Colonel Vilyam Fisher (aka Rudolf Abel) at the Glienicke Bridge in Berlin, Germany.

7 June
A U.S. Navy Douglas A3D Skywarrior,138970, of the Heavy Attack Squadron 4 (VAH-4) and crewed by Lt Commander Howard Bradford “Buzz” Moore, Lieutenant Junior Grade Richard Dale North, Ensign Howard P. Lambert, and enlisted electrical technician George W. Mozier, suffered an engine flameout during takeoff from runway 24 at Naval Air Station Whidbey Island, Washington, during a training exercise. The pilot, Moore, slammed on the plane's rudder pedals, causing the wheels to lock and blowing a tire on the plane’s starboard landing gear. Moore mistakenly reduced cut the power to the port engine and announced he was aborting the takeoff. Shooting past the runway's arresting wire, he attempted a partial-power climb to land but the aircraft's controls became ineffective as it lost speed. It barreled off straight out from the runway, over the seawall, and plunged into Puget Sound 200 feet from the shore of Whidbey Island, sinking in the shallow waters. Moore and North - a father of 8 and whose widow later remarried to form the part of the blended family that was the basis of the 1968 movie, "Yours, Mine and Ours" - were killed in the crash.

8 June
During a ground test run at Edwards Air Force Base, California, the XLR-99 rocket engine of North American X-15-3, 56–6672, exploded, destroying the aircraft aft of the wing, and throwing the forward fuselage with pilot Scott Crossfield in it 30 feet forward. Fortunately, Crossfield was not injured.

24 June
2 Douglas A1E, of the 1st Air Commando Wing, Hurlburt AFB, Florida, midair collision during a training mission.

A-1E SKYRAIDER REGISTRATION 52-132644 The mid-air collision of two Douglas A-1 Skyraiders, of the 4407th Combat Crew Training Squadron, 4410th Combat Crew Training Wing 1st Air Commando Wing over the small community of Children's Home in north Okaloosa County, Florida, resulted in the deaths of four Hurlburt Field pilots: Maj. Robert W. Robinson, Capt. James J. Jines, Jr., Capt. Edward P. Doyle and Maj. Donald L. Lumadue. The collision occurred while the planes were flying formation during a routine training mission. Eyewitnesses saw one man bail out and apparently maneuver his parachute. However, his body was found some hours later in a wooded area some distance from the wreckage of the two planes. Testimony from investigators stated that the planes were "dogfighting" with two F-100 jets, both of which pulled out before the A-1E, 52-132644, piloted by Doyle (the wingman) crashed into the cockpit of the A-1G, 52-132535, piloted by Jines.

27 June
A Boeing KC-97G Stratofreighter, 52-2728, of the 380th Air Refueling Squadron, Plattsburgh AFB, New York, suffered failure of lubrication on an engine impeller shaft, during an evening four-hour training mission to refuel a Boeing B-47 Stratojet. During rendezvous at 15,500 feet, bomber crew saw the tanker's number one (port outer) engine burst into flames, burning fuel threatening the wing integrity. As the bomber moved away from the burning tanker, the crew tried unsuccessfully to put out the blaze. The plane went into a spin as the wing failed outboard of the engine and crashed on Jonathan Smith Mountain, a hill east of Puzzle Mountain in Newry, Maine. The flash of the fire was seen from as far away as Lewiston and Bridgton, and several people witnessed the crash, including hundreds of movie-goers at the Rumford Point Drive-In. All five crew were killed – two were found wearing unused parachutes. Killed while flying (KWF) were Lt. William Burgess, commander, of Indian Lake, New York; Technical Sgt. Robert Costello, boom operator, of Springfield, Illinois; Lt. Raymond Kisonas, navigator, of Waterbury, Connecticut; Lt. Lewis Turner, co-pilot, of Spokane, Washington; and Master Sgt. Harold Young, flight engineer, of Selma, Alabama. Wreckage covered five acres and is still there.

29 June
A Beriev Be-10 flying boat, c/n 9600403, was seriously damaged in a hard landing during a Soviet Navy acceptance flight in Taganrog Bay, near the Russian coast of the Sea of Azov. Test pilot Yu. A Tsirulyov seriously misjudged the craft's altitude due to abnormally calm conditions and a resultant lack of waves, which are commonly used by flying boat pilots to judge altitude during a water landing; gunner and radio operator N.A. Avdeyenyo was seriously injured on impact, having loosened his seat harness prematurely. Be-10 acceptance flights were conducted with a cutter nearby to respond to problems on takeoff and landing, and the flight crew could have requested that it cross the landing area, thus creating a wake that could serve as a visual aid; however, the flight crew did not do this.

1 July
A Boeing RB-47H, of the 55th Strategic Reconnaissance Wing, was shot down by a Soviet Air Defense Forces MiG-19 over the Barents Sea while on a signals intelligence mission, killing four of six on board; the two survivors were picked up by Soviet trawlers and held at Lubyanka prison in Moscow and were later released by Nikita Khrushchev following President John F. Kennedy's inauguration. This accident happened exactly two months after a U-2 was shot down and as a result increased tensions created by that incident.

6 July
Goodyear ZPG-3W, BuNo 144242, lost hull pressure and crashed into the Atlantic Ocean off New Jersey, eighteen of twenty-one crew were lost. This was the last U.S. Navy lighter-than-air loss as it led to cancellation of airship operations on 28 June 1961. A contributing reason for the cancellation was the improved speed of Soviet subs.

7 July
A Royal Air Force (RAF) Vickers Varsity T.1 WJ914 collided at 1500 ft near RAF Oakington, Cambridgeshire, United Kingdom with an RAF de Havilland Vampire T11 XD549, all six occupants of the Varsity and two in the Vampire died.

14 July
Lockheed U-2A, 56-6720, Article 387, the 27th airframe of the first USAF production batch, delivered in October 1957 and assigned to the 4080th Strategic Reconnaissance Wing, Laughlin AFB, Texas, as a "ferret" aircraft, crashed this date in the early morning ~30 miles NE of Laughlin. Pilot Maj. Raleigh Myers experienced an oxygen fire in the cockpit after a pressure-reducing switch failed, ignited by the 24-volt power supply line to the switch. He bailed out at 24,000 feet (7,300 m), escaping safely. The oxygen supply system is subsequently redesigned.

19 July
In the wake of the Congo Crisis, a Belgian Air Force (BAF) Fairchild C-119G Flying Boxcar, CP36, c/n 11083, crashed into a mountain in Rushengo near Goma after an engine caught fire. 41 were killed.

27 July
North American F-100C Super Sabre, reported as 53-1740, assigned to the USAF Thunderbirds on 28 March 1960, was destroyed this date during a solo proficiency flight when it crashed fifty miles from Nellis AFB, Nevada, killing Capt. John R. Crane, team narrator. Joe Baugher lists this serial as shot down by gunfire 14 March 1969, in Southeast Asia. Confirmation needed.

12 August
RAF Vickers Valiant BK.1 XD864 crashed at RAF Spanhoe 3 minutes after takeoff from RAF Wittering, Cambs. Five crew were killed.

20 August
A U. S. Army helicopter crashed on 20 August 1960 at approximately 1500 hours while participating in the field exercise Bright Star at Fort Bragg, North Carolina. The crash occurred in a wooded area on the military reservation. A total of six persons were aboard the aircraft at the time of the crash, including two crew members and four passengers. All occupants were injured, with injuries ranging from minor to critical. An investigation was conducted on the causes of injuries.

6 September
A North American GAM-77 Hound Dog missile launched from a Boeing B-52 Stratofortress over the Eglin Air Force Base, Florida test range at ~2 p.m. went astray, coming down on a farm near Samson, Alabama. Lt. Col. Gerry Garner, Eglin Air Force Base public information director, stated that an investigation was underway into the errant missile's failure. The missile ignored repeated attempts by the range safety officer to self-destruct.

8 September
A USAF Boeing WB-50D Superfortress crashed and burned in mountains six miles E of Ishikawa, Japan, early Thursday, killing at least nine of eleven on board instantly. Townspeople who heard the weather-plane crash are foiled at rescue attempts by searing heat. Nine charred bodies were pulled from the wreckage. The plane, on a routine weather mission, had been aloft from Yokota Air Base for about an hour. B-50D-105-BO, 48-122, converted to WB-50D. Crashed with 56th WRS.

22 September
USN/VCP-61 lost an aircraft 180 miles SE of Naha, Okinawa with the loss of 2 Marines (Flight Crew) and 13 USN personnel. (The event does not appear in military records, but is confirmed by USN Casualty Report #93353-A-23-21. By cross-referencing newspaper stories and "official" US Government records of both civilian and military air disasters, there are many air disasters in the Cold War Era that appear in the newspapers but not on Government records, particularly ones over the Pacific in a triangle defined as Guam, Manila, and Okinawa as the apexes.) The aircraft lost was actually a USMC Douglas R5D-3 Skymaster, BuNo 56541, (ex-USAAF C-54D-15-DC, 43-17241), c/n 22191/DC642, en route from Atsugi, Japan, to NAS Cubi Point, Philippines, carrying three crew and 26 passengers all of whom were lost. It went down after "transmitting a message that the No. 3 engine was on fire and they were diverting to Okinawa. The fire in the No. 3 engine was extinguished but a residual fire continued in a tire until it ignited the fuel tank resulting in an explosion."

25 October
A Royal Canadian Navy McDonnell F2H-3 Banshee, BuNo 126415, struck a portable practice landing mirror and tow-truck parked on Runway 16R at naval air station HMCS Shearwater, Nova Scotia, Canada after an earlier CS2F Tracker landing-practice exercise had been postponed due to rain. Two VF-870 Banshees were subsequently cleared to land and continuing rain prevented the pilots from seeing the unlit mirror in time to take evasive action; Lt. Jim Barker's aircraft struck the mirror at high speed, shearing off the port-side wingtip and auxiliary wingtip fuel tank, demolishing the mirror, and damaging the tow-truck. Barker maintained directional control and stopped the Banshee on the runway, but the impact caused irreparable internal damage to the airframe, and the aircraft was written off. The incident is attributed to the failure of Shearwater air traffic controllers to alert the pilots that the mirror was parked on the runway.

17 November
Vought F8U-1 Crusader, BuNo 145374, of VF-211, 'NP' tail code, on a WestPac deployment, suffered a ramp strike aboard USS Lexington CVA-16, shearing the port main gear, and puncturing the main fuel cell; pilot CDR H. C. Lovegrove ejected and was recovered.

20 November
A F-84F Thunderstreak of the Royal Netherlands Air Force crashed at 7:50pm into a farm in Lutjelollum between Wjelsryp and Franeker, the Netherlands. The pilot and the family of six people who lived at the farm were all killed. The farm was destroyed and burned down and the livestock was killed.

3 December
A fully fueled Martin XSM-68-3-MA Titan I ICBM, 58-2254, a Lot V missile, V-2, being lowered into a silo at the Operational System Test Facility, Vandenberg AFB, California, following pre-launch tests, the ninth attempt at completing this test, dropped to the bottom of the underground launch tube when the elevator failed. The missile exploded, wrecking the silo, which was never repaired. No injuries were sustained, however. This was the first silo accident.

11 December
Avro Lancastrian T-102 of the Argentine Air Force crashed near San Andrés de Giles, Argentina. All 31 on board were killed. This is the worst accident involving this type of aircraft.

17 December
A United States Air Force (USAF) Convair C-131D Samaritan, 55-291, of the 7500th Air Base Group, on take-off from Munich-Riem Airport for a flight to RAF Northolt, United Kingdom, crashed at 14:10 local time in Munich, Germany, due to loss of power in one engine caused by fuel starvation; aircraft struck a church steeple and then a tramcar at Bayerstraße/Martin-Greif-Straße. All 20 on board died as well as another 32 on the ground.

22 December
Three Navy men, none of them a flier, took a Beechcraft T-34 Mentor on an unauthorized flight from Naval Air Station New Iberia, Louisiana, ~75 miles to near Lake Charles, where they ended up overturned in a ditch. None was injured. Authorities at NAS New Iberia identify the three as Airman Terry W, Stevens, South Norwalk, Connecticut; Mechanic C. W. Little, Stephenville, Texas; and Aviation Metalsmith John T. Ellerman, Hobart, Indiana. The T-34 comes to grief five miles E of Chennault Air Force Base.

== 1961 ==
4 January
During Minimum Interval Takeoff (MITO) from Pease AFB, New Hampshire, Boeing B-47E Stratojet, 53-4244, of the 100th Bomb Wing, number 2 in a three-ship cell, lost control, crashed into trees and burned. Killed were aircraft commander, Capt. Thomas C. Weller, co-pilot 1st Lt. Ronald Chapo, navigator 1st Lt. J. A. Wether, and crew chief S/Sgt. Stephen J. Merva.

11 January
USAF test pilot Jack B. Mayo disappeared over the Gulf of Mexico while test-firing M61 Vulcan cannons from a Republic F-105D Thunderchief. He was officially declared missing eight days later. Mayo was attached to Air Research and Development Command, Air Proving Ground Center, Eglin Air Force Base. Possible causes of the accident include loss of stabilator, engine or gun malfunction or pilot incapacitation. In 1959 Mayo had been one of the 32 finalists for NASA Astronaut Group 1, but ultimately was not selected.

12 January
Two Convair F-102 Delta Daggers of the 111th Fighter-Interceptor Squadron, Texas Air National Guard, Ellington AFB, Texas, were scrambled to intercept an unidentified aircraft approaching the Texas Gulf coast. For unknown reasons, F-102A, 56-1015, caught fire and crashed in a rice field near Alvin, Texas, killing the pilot.

19 January
Boeing B-52B Stratofortress, 53-0390, "Felon 22", of the 334th Bomb Squadron, 95th Bomb Wing, Biggs AFB, Texas, exploded and crashed 10 miles N of Monticello, Utah, after failure of tail section in turbulence-induced accident. Four crewmembers including the captain were killed; three members parachuted safely, but one died of exposure before being found.

22 January
A Lockheed Superconstellation crashed on Midway Island, killing 6 on board and 3 in a truck on the ground.
24 January
U.S. Air Force Boeing B-52G Stratofortress, 58-0187, (the last Block 95 airframe), "Keep 19", of the 4241st Strategic Wing, 822d Air Division, Eighth Air Force, on Coverall airborne alert suffered structural failure of its starboard wing and resulting fuel leak, over Goldsboro, North Carolina; the wing failed when flaps were engaged during emergency approach to Seymour Johnson AFB. Two atomic weapons on board broke loose during airframe disintegration; one of them parachuted safely to ground, the other impacted on marshy farm land, broke apart and sank into a quagmire. Air Force excavated fifty feet down, but found no trace of the bomb, forcing permanent digging easement on site. Parts of the weapon were recovered elsewhere. The tail was found at 22 feet down, along with the plutonium core as well as other fragments. The project was abandoned before the entire uranium mass could be recovered, due to uncontrollable ground-water flooding. The USAF purchased the land, to safeguard the in situ remains. Five of the eight crew-members survived.

26 January
A US Air Force Douglas C-118 51-17626 disappeared over the Atlantic Ocean on a flight from Lajes Air Force Base, Azores to Argentia Naval Air Station, Newfoundland, Canada. Twenty-three military personnel were on board.

5 March
A Boeing KB-50 Superfortress of the 431st Air Refueling Squadron, Tactical Air Command, returning to Biggs Air Force Base, El Paso, Texas from a routine refueling mission in the Pacific, crashed on approach to the base, killing all nine aboard. The explosion on impact was so large that one witness saw it from 30 miles away; wreckage was spread over a half-mile area. Only the tail was left intact. Seven crew-members and two maintenance men were killed. The plane's last stop was at McClellan AFB, California. B-50D-120-BO Superfortress, 49-328, c/n 16104, converted to KB-50 tanker.

10 March
Douglas RB-66C Destroyer, 54-0471, of the 9th Tactical Reconnaissance Squadron, suffered an explosion in its starboard engine on climb-out from Shaw AFB, South Carolina, and thereupon attempted an emergency landing in zero-zero visibility weather at Donaldson AFB at Greenville, South Carolina. On the second attempt the aircraft struck an embankment to the right of the runway threshold, slid onto the airfield and caught fire. The crew escaped with only minor injuries.

13 March
A Lockheed F-104A-25-LO Starfighter, 56-0859, c/n 183-1147, of the 157th Fighter-Interceptor Squadron, South Carolina Air National Guard, Congaree ANGB, scrambled by Air Defense Command on a practice alert, experienced a main fuel control malfunction with loss of power, crashing near Highway 178, eight miles W of Swansea, South Carolina. Pilot 2d Lt. Michael M. Miller, 23, Columbia, South Carolina, ejected safely and descended near North, South Carolina, ~10 miles from the crash site.

14 March
Failure of a cabin pressurization system forced U.S. Air Force Boeing B-52F Stratofortress, 57-0166, to fly low, accelerating fuel-burn and leading to fuel starvation at 10,000 feet over Yuba City, California. The bomber subsequently crashed, killing its commander. Two nuclear weapons on board tore loose on impact but no explosion or contamination resulted.

15 March
Capt. Gary L. Herod of the Texas Air National Guard was killed when his Lockheed T-33A Shooting Star trainer crashed in a vacant field in suburban Houston, Texas. He was posthumously awarded the Distinguished Flying Cross for his heroism in not ejecting, but instead staying with his plane and guiding it to a vacant field, saving the lives and homes of area residents.

17 March
North American A3J-1 Vigilante, BuNo 146700, crashed over NAS Patuxent River, Maryland. Pilot Lt. Cdr. Grimes ejects, but was killed.

19 March
Eleventh Lockheed U-2A, 56-6684, Article 351, (delivered to the CIA 18 May 1956, modified to U-2C by July 1959) was returning from a night celestial nav-training sortie, crashed on landing at Taoyuan Air Base, Taiwan, killing Republic Of China Air Force pilot Chih Yao Hua. During a touch-and-go landing, he applied power but lost control, the aircraft veering left, crashing and exploding. Unit was the CIA's Detachment H, ROCAF 35th Squadron.

23 March
Valentin V. Bondarenko, a Soviet Air Force pilot selected for cosmonaut training in 1960, died while training in a ground-based spacecraft simulator at the end of a ten-day isolation test. Fire broke out in the capsule, which was filled with a pure oxygen atmosphere, when he dropped an alcohol-dipped swab onto a hot ring. "Although he tried to extinguish the fire himself, he was unable to control it before the outside scientists equalised the cabin pressure with normal atmospheric pressure. He was pulled from the fire alive, but died soon afterwards in hospital," a grim parallel to the 1967 Apollo 1 accident.

30 March
A Boeing B-52 Stratofortress, 59-2576, of the 341st Bombardment Squadron, 4038th Strategic Wing, Dow Air Force Base, Maine, exploded in flight at 2115 hrs. with the wreckage falling near Denton, North Carolina. Debris was scattered over a ten-mile (16 km) area, starting fires in woods and fields. Of the eight-man crew, only six had ejection seats, only five ejected and only two survived. The dead were Capt. William D. McMullen, 36, commander/pilot, Bad Axe, Michigan; Capt. William W. Farmer, 29, co-pilot, Wilson, North Carolina; Capt. Robert M. Morgenroth, 31, radar navigator, Christiana, Pennsylvania; Capt. George W. Beale, 34, competition observer, Bowling Green, Virginia; Sgt. James H. Fults, 29, instructor gunner, Tracy City, Tennessee; and A1C Robert N. Gaskey, 28, Providence, Rhode Island. The survivors are Major Wilbur F. Minnich, 40, Des Plaines, Illinois; and 1st Lt. Glen C. Farnham, 25, electronics warfare officer, Loveland, Texas. The survivors bailed out at 30,000 feet (9,100 m) and landed six to seven miles (11 km) away from the crash site. Maj. Minnich, the navigator, suffered a dislocated arm when he bailed out. Lt. Farnham complained of back pains but was apparently unhurt. There were no nuclear weapons on board the bomber. Minutes before the explosion the plane had attempted to make contact with a Boeing KC-135 Stratotanker jet tanker to be refuelled in flight. Col. Oscar V. Jones, commander of the 4241st Strategic Air Command Wing at Seymour Johnson AFB, Goldsboro, North Carolina, stated that the bomber was in "the observation position 100 to 200 feet behind and below the tanker just before the explosion, but never made contact." Col. Jones arrived at the site before dawn today [31 March] to take charge of operations.

7 April
A United States Air Force Boeing B-52B Stratofortress, 53-0380, "Ciudad Juarez", of the 95th Bomb Wing, Biggs AFB, Texas, was shot down by inadvertent launch of AIM-9 Sidewinder from a 188th Fighter Interceptor Squadron, New Mexico ANG North American F-100A Super Sabre, 53-1662. Two F-100s, piloted by 1st Lt. James W. van Sycoc and Capt. Dale Dodd, had made five passes at the bomber when, on the sixth pass, pilot 1st Lt. van Sycoc radioed "Look out! One of my missiles is loose!" The heat-seeking missile struck one of the BUFF's engine pods on the port wing causing failure of the wing structure, and subsequent breakup of the bomber. Pilot, co-pilot, crew chief and tail gunner successfully ejected, but three other crew-members were killed while flying (KWF) when the B-52 crashed on Mount Taylor, New Mexico.

11 April
A U.S. Air Force McDonnell F-101B Voodoo, 57-0401, of the 75th Fighter-Interceptor Squadron, returning from an Air Defense Command patrol over the Atlantic Ocean, dropped too low in poor visibility on approach to Dow AFB, Maine, and struck Bald Mountain, near Ellsworth, Maine, killing pilot Capt. Vernal Johnson and Lt. Edward Masaitis. The aircraft's wreckage was left in situ and the Maine Aviation Historical Society has erected a plaque commemorating the crew and asking that the wreck remain undisturbed.

18 May
Commander J. L. Felsman, US Navy, was killed in a McDonnell F4H Phantom II, BuNo 145316, during the first attempt at "Operation Sageburner" speed record at White Sands Missile Range, New Mexico, when his aircraft disintegrated in the air after pitch damper failure. "The resulting pilot-induced oscillation generated over 12 Gs. Both engines were ripped from the airframe and Felsman was killed." This was the first fatal Phantom II accident.

24 May
U.S. Air Force Douglas C-124A Globemaster II, 51-0174, of the 63d Troop Carrier Wing, MATS, Donaldson AFB, South Carolina, lost power on number two (port inner) engine, caught fire at 500 feet altitude one minute after 0230 hrs. take-off from McChord AFB, Washington; it subsequently hit trees two miles south of runway and exploded, killing 18 of the 22 persons on board. The transport was en route to Lawton Municipal Airport, Lawton, Oklahoma, with 12 soldiers from Fort Sill, who had been taking part in Exercise Lava Plains at the Yakima Firing Center. In addition, the Globemaster carried a truck, several jeeps and two trailers. One additional badly burned survivor died en route to hospital. Air Force Board of Investigation, relying heavily on two eyewitness accounts of the aircraft's final moments, determined the accident was probably caused by a ruptured fuel line resulting in engine failure during takeoff, the plane's most vulnerable period. One of the four survivors was Master Sergeant Llewellyn Morris Chilson (1920–1981), whom President Harry S Truman (1884–1972) referred to as a "one-man army." On 6 December 1946, in a ceremony at the White House, President Truman had bestowed seven combat decorations on Sergeant Chilson for killing 56 German soldiers and helping to capture 243 others during five months of combat during World War II (1941–1945). Sgt. Chilson received three Distinguished Service Crosses, two Silver Stars, the Bronze Star and the Legion of Merit. He had previously received two Purple Hearts, a Distinguished Unit Citation, the Combat Infantryman's Badge and the French Army's Croix de Guerre with palms. Chilson, described as one of the nation's greatest soldiers, died 2 October 1981, while visiting friends in Florida.

25 May
Brigadier General Barnie B. McEntire, Jr., commander of the South Carolina Air National Guard, was killed when his Lockheed F-104A Starfighter, 56-0853, suffered engine failure on take off from Olmsted Air Force Base, Pennsylvania; he stayed with the jet to crash into the Susquehanna River rather than risk it crashing into populated areas of Harrisburg, Pennsylvania. Congaree Air National Guard Base near Eastover, South Carolina, was subsequently renamed in his honor in October 1961 by Governor Ernest F. Hollings.

4 June
Lieutenant Colonel David F. "Snapper" McCallister, Jr. (Commander, 142d Fighter Bomber Squadron, Delaware Air National Guard) and Brigadier General William W. Spruance (Assistant Adjutant General for Air) were flying a Lockheed T-33A Shooting Star jet trainer, 53-5955, out of Scott AFB, Illinois, when the aircraft lost power, and crashed. Colonel McCallister died and General Spruance received serious burn injuries. Milton Caniff is said to have based the character of Hotshot Charlie in the comic strip Terry and the Pirates on McCallister. He set a fighter record by flying his North American F-86 Sabre, "Cindee Lind 7th", 1,922 miles in 3 hours, 30 minutes to win the Air Force Association's Earl T. Ricks Memorial Trophy in 1956, given to Air Guard members for outstanding airmanship.

13 June
A U.S. Navy Grumman S-2 Tracker lost complete power in the port engine due to fire, plus partial loss-of-power in the starboard, and subsequently crashed. Flying instructor Lt. J.G Loren Vern Page, 24, died 6 hours later at Iberia Parish Hospital, in New Iberia, Louisiana. After losing power, he intentionally attempted ditching the aircraft in Spanish Lake, near the Naval Auxiliary Air Station New Iberia. Students Lt. J.G. Donald L. Miller and a second unnamed student were both hospitalized with treatable injuries. Lt. J.G. Page was posthumously promoted to full Lieutenant status by the Secretary of the Navy, John B. Connally, for courage and valor. Also named for courage during the rescue of the pilot and the 2 students were LCDR Alvin E. Henke, who commanded the rescue mission, Dr. Lt. Donald E. Hines (MC), and hospital corpsman 3rd class Arthur J. Hoeny. Lt. J.G. Miller was also credited with assisting in the rescue. Lt. Page was survived by his wife Elsa and a daughter, Deborah Anne.

16 June
Royal Canadian Navy pilot SubLt. I.K. Rassow was killed when he flew his McDonnell F2H-3 Banshee, BuNo 126434 of VF-870, into a rocky knoll during aerobatic practice near Indian Harbour, Nova Scotia.

July
On its 20th and final flight in July 1961, the sole Hiller X-18, 57-3078, suffered a propeller pitch control problem while attempting to convert to a hover at 10,000 ft and went into a spin. The crew regained control and landed at Edwards Air Force Base, California, but the X-18 never flew again.

10 July
A Supermarine Scimitar F.1, XD269, went over the port side of HMS Victorious after a brake failure.

5 August
A Gloster Javelin (FAW.9) XH791: crashed in East Pakistan (now Bangladesh) during a ferry flight flown by 12 Group Ferry Unit from Calcutta, India to deliver the aircraft to 60 Sqn RAF at Tengah Air Base, Singapore. Both engines suffered centreline closure at 33,000 feet. The aircraft dropped out of the delivery flight formation and went into a spin over the Meghna River. Flt. Lt. E.N. Owens was killed on ejection due to a seat malfunction and Master Navigator A. Melton was injured on landing. Owens is buried at the Dhaka Christian Cemetery. Navigator "Tony" Melton survived three days in the jungle before being rescued, and later became chief jungle survival instructor.

29 August
Six people in an aerial tramway car plummeted 700 feet (210 m) to their deaths when an Armée de l'Air Republic F-84F Thunderstreak jet fighter struck and severed the downward-travelling tramway cable. The car, containing a German family of four and an Italian father and son, was returning from the Alpine peak of Aiguille du Midi to Chamonix. The upward-traveling cable was undamaged, but 81 tourists were stranded for hours until they could be rescued.

27 September
A U.S. Air Force Boeing RB-47K Stratojet, 53-4279, of the 55th Strategic Reconnaissance Wing, lost No. 6 engine during take-off from Forbes AFB, Kansas and crashed, killing all four crew-members, aircraft commander Lt. Col. James G. Woolbright, copilot 1st Lt. Paul R. Greenwalt (also reported as Greenawalt), navigator Capt. Bruce Kowol, and crewchief S/Sgt. Myron Curtis. The cause was discovered to be contaminated water-alcohol in the airplane's assisted takeoff system.

21 October
Vought F8U-1 Crusader, BuNo 145357, of VF-11, arrestor hook and right landing gear broke during a heavy landing on USS Franklin D. Roosevelt, causing the aircraft to catch fire and go over the ship's port side. A series of nine photographs taken by Photographer's Mate L.J. Cera showed the crash sequence with pilot Lt. J.G Kryway ejecting in Martin-Baker Mk. F-5 seat just as the fighter left the deck. These images were widely distributed in the Navy to assure pilots that the seat could save them. Kryway escaped with minor injuries, being picked up by helicopter ten minutes later. Joe Baugher notes that date of 21 August 1961 has also been reported.

25 October
A Sikorsky HSS-1N Seabat, 139, of the Royal Netherlands Navy, ditched in the Moray Firth, near Scotland.

1 December
A US Air Force North American F-100C Super Sabre of the 136th Tactical Fighter Squadron, 107th Tactical Fighter Group, New York Air National Guard, departed Niagara Falls Air Force Base, New York, on a training flight to Erie, Pennsylvania, but pilot Lt. Edward Metlot, of New York City, was informed by his wingman that his plane was on fire. He steered the fighter towards the Niagara River Gorge to avoid populated areas, ejecting at the last moment, the plane narrowly missing forty workmen on the Queenston-Lewiston Steel Arch Bridge. He landed along the American shoreline, the jet impacting on the riverbank and exploding below Niagara Falls.

3 December
A USAF Douglas C-47 Skytrain departed Aviano Air Base, Italy, on a routine practice flight, and less than a half hour later crashed into a 4,000-foot fog-shrouded Alpine mountain, killing all four crew. The Associated Press reported from Udine, Italy, that the plane was a mere 15 feet short of clearing the peak. Rescue teams working their way up the mountainside were guided by the flaming wreckage.

12 December
Mid-air collision of two BAF Fairchild C-119 Flying Boxcars at Chièvres Air Base, Belgium. 13 crew aboard C-119G-FA, CP-23, c/n 10951, and C-119G-FA, CP-25, c/n 11082, are killed as well as eight on the ground.

14 December
Second prototype Hawker Siddeley P.1127, XP836, crashed at RNAS Yeovilton when one of the front 'cold nozzles' was lost in flight. The aircraft became uncontrollable on approach to Yeovilton and its pilot, A. W. "Bill" Bedford, ejected at 200 feet altitude.

== 1962 ==
5 January
Three crew are killed in crash of U.S. Air Force Boeing B-47E Stratojet, AF Ser. No. 52-0615, of the 22d Bomb Wing, at March AFB, California. This is the last fatal crash at that base until 19 October 1978. Pilot was Major Clarence Weldon Garrett.

8 January
A U.S. Air Force KB-50 aerial tanker with nine crew members onboard disappeared approximately 240 miles (390 km) east of Norfolk, Virginia, on a flight from Langley Air Force Base to the Azores. Despite an exhaustive search of 325,000 square miles (840,000 km^{2}) of the Atlantic, nothing was found of the aircraft or its crew. Pilot was Major Robert Tawney of Middletown, Ohio.

16 January
A Strategic Air Command (SAC) Boeing B-47E Stratojet of the 380th Bomb Wing, Plattsburgh AFB, New York, on low-altitude bombing run training mission, is reported overdue at 0700 hrs. Last radio call was at ~0200 hrs. After four day search, wreckage is spotted in the Adirondack High Peaks. Bomber clipped the top of Wright Peak (16th tallest mountain in the Adirondacks, at 4580 feet) after veering 30 miles off course in inclement weather, high winds. Aircraft Commander 1st Lt. Rodney D. Bloomgren, of Jamestown, New York, copilot 1st Lt. Melvin Spencer, navigator 1st Lt. Albert W. Kandetski and observer A1C Kenneth R. Jensen killed while flying (KWF). Pilot, copilot remains found after ~a week, navigator found later. Observer's remains never recovered. A memorial plaque was erected on a rock near the summit by the 380th Bomb Wing.

4 February
Seven are killed in the crash of a Hurlburt Field, Fla., Douglas C-47 Skytrain. The plane, returning from a routine flight to McGuire Air Force Base, N.J., crashed on take-off following a stop at Greensboro-High Point, N.C., to pick up one passenger. A spokesman said that the plane did not stay at Greensboro long enough to cut off its engines. Those killed were: Captain Richard J. Rice, 34, Fort Walton Beach, Fla., pilot; Captain David L. Murphy, 30, Bloomfield, Neb., co-pilot; Captain Thomas D. Carter, 27, Helena, Ark., navigator; T-Sgt. Bernard P. Terrien, 32, Gillett, Wis., flight engineer; Captain Robert H. Sanford, 34, Greensboro, N.C., passenger; 1st Lt. Dudley J. Hughes, 28, Fort Walton Beach, Fla.; and 2-Sgt. Preston Presley, APO 26, N.Y. A retired Civil Air Patrol colonel, told the Associated Press that, "It was an abnormal take off." The plane "rose 200 feet off the runway, stalled, and its right wing scraped the runway. The plane cartwheeled off the runway and caught fire."

1 March
Fourth Lockheed U-2A, Article 344, AF Ser. No. 56–6677, delivered to the CIA on 20 November 1955, converted to U-2F by October 1961, crashes near Edwards Air Force Base, California, during aerial refueling training, killing SAC pilot Captain John Campbell. Airframe entered jetwash behind the Boeing KC-135 Stratotanker, and broke up.

21 April
Two residents are killed when a Convair F-102 Delta Dagger participating in the opening of the Century 21 Exposition, Seattle, Washington, suffers engine flame out and the pilot ejects. The fighter strikes homes north of the city. It was one of ten from the 64th Fighter-Interceptor Squadron at Paine Field that did a flypast of the fairgrounds.

15 May
During refuelling at Whiteman AFB, Missouri, Boeing B-47E Stratojet, AF Ser. No. 53-6230, of 340th Bomb Wing catches fire, 10,000 gallons of fuel ignite. Four firemen are killed and 18 others injured when fireball engulfs all within 100 feet of burning aircraft.

17 May
RAF Blackburn Beverly C.1, XL132, c/n 1033, bound for RAF Thorney Island, suffers engine fire while on approach, ditches in Chichester Harbour, UK. Two crew killed.

24 May
U.S. Air Force Douglas C-124A Globemaster II, AF Ser. No. 51-0147, c/n 43481, on local training flight out of Tachikawa Air Base, Japan, strikes Oku-Chichibu Mountains, killing seven crew.

3 June
Bluegill, the first planned test of Operation Fishbowl, under Operation Dominic, to fly a nuclear warhead on Douglas SM-75 Thor IRBM, 58-2310, vehicle number 199, from Johnston Island in the Pacific Ocean, fails. Launched just after midnight, the missile appears to be on a normal trajectory, but the radar tracking system loses track of the vehicle. Because of the large number of ships and aircraft in the area, there is no way to predict if the missile is on a safe trajectory, so the range safety officers order the missile with its warhead to be destroyed. No nuclear detonation occurs, but no data is obtained either. Although, by definition, this qualifies as a Broken Arrow incident, this test is rarely included in lists of such mishaps.

5 June
RAF Hawker Hunter T.7 trainer (XL610) from No. 111 Squadron based at RAF Wattisham on a routine training flight flying in formation with 2 other aircraft crashes near Silk Willoughby, Lincolnshire, UK killing the 2 crew.

19 June
Two Republic F-105 Thunderchiefs out of Nellis AFB, Nevada, are lost in separate accidents near Indian Springs, Nevada, this date. F-105D, AF Ser. No. 59-1740, is lost near Indian Springs due to control failure, pilot successfully ejecting. F-105D, 60-0410, written off at Indian Springs due to engine fire, pilot ejected successfully. Following this pair of major accidents, all F-105B and D aircraft are grounded for correction of chafing and flight control deficiencies. The project, called Look Alike and started in July 1962, is expected to be completed quickly but due to continued operational problems will grow to an extensive two-year modification program costing U.S.$51 million.

19 June
Starfish, the second planned test of Operation Fishbowl, under Operation Dominic, occurs with the launch of an SM-75 Thor IRBM missile with a nuclear warhead just before midnight from Johnston Island in the Pacific Ocean. The vehicle flies a normal trajectory for 59 seconds; then the rocket engine suddenly stops, and the missile begins to break apart. The range safety officer orders the destruction of the missile and the warhead. The missile was between 30,000 and 35,000 feet (between 9.1 and 10.7 km) in altitude when it was destroyed. Some of the missile parts fall on Johnston Island, and a large amount of missile debris falls into the ocean in the vicinity of the island. Navy Explosive Ordnance Disposal and Underwater Demolition Team swimmers recover approximately 250 pieces of the missile assembly during the next two weeks. Some of the debris is contaminated with plutonium. Nonessential personnel had been evacuated from Johnston Island during the test. Although, by definition, this qualifies as a Broken Arrow incident, this test is rarely included in lists of such mishaps.

22 July
Sud Ouest Vautour IIA, 123 of the Israeli Air Force, is being used as the testbed for the Shafrir 1 missile when the missile blows up on the ground while mounted on the aircraft.

23 July
A United States Air Force RB47-Stratojet, (SAC) bomber out of Dyess AFB, TX, crashed on Emigrant Peak in Montana after refueling at approximately 2030 hours. Four crewmen perished: Instructor Pilot - Captain J.W.Faulconer, Pilot - Lt. L.G. Sawyers, Co-Pilot - Lt. D.T. Sutton, Lt. F.J Hixenbaughand. A law passed by the 116th Congress (PL 116-167) in their honor allowed passed on Sept. 21, 2020, named the ridge of the crash site “B-47 Ridge” and allowed a memorial plaque to be placed at the site.

25 July
The third launch attempt of a nuclear warhead in Operation Fishbowl, as part of Operation Dominic, aboard a Douglas SM-75 Thor IRBM, 58-2291, vehicle number 180, from Johnston Island in the Pacific Ocean, named Bluegill Prime, after the 2 June 1962 failure of the first attempt, Bluegill, also fails when, due to a sticking valve, the Thor missile malfunctions after ignition of the rocket engine, but before leaving the launch pad. The range safety officer destroys the nuclear warhead by radio command with the missile still on the launch pad. The vehicle then explodes, causing extensive damage in the area of the launch pad. Although there was no danger of an accidental nuclear explosion, the destruction of the nuclear warhead on the pad causes extensive contamination of the area by alpha-emitting radioactive materials. Burning rocket fuel, flowing through the cable trenches, causes extensive chemical contamination of the trenches and the equipment associated with the cabling in the trenches. The radiation contamination on Johnston Island is determined to be a major problem, and it is necessary to decontaminate the entire area before the badly damaged launch pad can be rebuilt. Further launch operations will not resume until 15 October 1962. Although, by definition, this qualifies as a Broken Arrow incident, this test is rarely included in lists of such mishaps.

10 August
Flt. Lt. J.R. Mulhall of the Royal Canadian Air force, serving with 6 STR (Strike and Reconnaissance) OTU Cold Lake, Canada ejects from his CF-104 Starfighter, 102742 on 10th August 1962. He sustains fatal injuries when the parachute disintegrates in aircraft fire area.

28 August
While on an intermediate stop during a ferry flight to Moscow for acceptance testing, Kamov Ka-22, 0I-01, rolls to the left and crashes inverted, killing the entire crew. The cause is found to be the rotor linkage, and further inspection found that two of the other three Ka-22s suffer from the same defect. Subsequently, in order to improve stability and control, a complex differential autopilot is installed. This sensed attitude and angular accelerations, and fed into the control system.

10 September
A U.S. Air Force Boeing KC-135A Stratotanker, AF ser. No. 60-0352, assigned at Ellsworth Air Force Base, South Dakota, crashes into a fog-shrouded ravine on 5,271-foot tall Mount Kit Carson, ~20 miles NE of Spokane, Washington, at ~1105 hrs. while on approach to Fairchild AFB, Washington, killing four crew and 40 passengers. Thirty-nine were members of the 28th Bomb Wing, being sent TDY to Fairchild while runways were being repaired at Ellsworth. One civilian was on board. The aircraft mowed through a 25 X 200 yard swath of evergreens before striking the terrain and exploding. Visibility was near zero. Col. Floyd R. Cressman, of Fairchild AFB, said that it appeared that the pilot tried to pull up at the last moment. A spokesman at SAC headquarters in Omaha, Nebraska, said that this was the worst accident involving the C-135 type to date.

22 September
US Navy Martin P5B Marlin 140144 crashes after striking high ground on Montague Island, Alaska during a routine patrol flight, killing all ten on board.

15 October
Eighty-two days after the failure of the Bluegill Prime test in Operation Fishbowl, under Operation Dominic, a third attempt is made, Bluegill Double Prime. Launched from rebuilt facilities on Johnston Island, damaged in the last attempt, at ~2330 hrs., local time (16 October UTC), the SM-75 Thor missile, 58-2267, vehicle number 156, malfunctions and begins tumbling out of control about 85 seconds after liftoff, and the range safety officer orders the destruction of the missile and its nuclear warhead about 95 seconds after launch. Although, by definition, this qualifies as a Broken Arrow incident, this test is rarely included in lists of such mishaps.

23 October
A U.S. Air Force Boeing C-135B Stratolifter, AF Ser. No. 62-4136, of the Military Air Transport Service, delivering a load of ammunition from McGuire AFB, New Jersey, to Naval Station Guantanamo Bay, Cuba, as part of the military response to the Cuban Missile Crisis, stalls and crashes short of the runway, killing all seven crew. This was the first cargo C-135 hull loss.

27 October
Major Rudolf Anderson, a Greenville, South Carolina native and 1948 graduate from Clemson University's cadet corps and pilot with the 4080th Strategic Reconnaissance Wing is tasked with an overflight of Cuba on mission 3128, in a CIA Lockheed U-2F spyplane, remarked with U.S. Air Force insignia, to take photos of the Soviet SS-N-4 medium-range ballistic missiles (MRBMs) and SS-N-5 intermediate-range ballistic missile (IRBMs) build-ups. Anderson had first qualified on the U-2 type on 3 September 1957. This would be his sixth Cuban overflight. He departed McCoy AFB, Florida at 0909 hrs ET. Contrary to Moscow orders to not engage reconnaissance flights, a single Soviet-manned SA-2 missile battery at Banes fired at Anderson's high-flying U-2F, AF Ser. No. 56-6676, (Article 343), at 1021 hrs, Havana time (1121 hrs. ET). Although not a direct hit, several pieces of shrapnel punctured the canopy and the pilot's partial pressure suit and helmet, resulting in Anderson's immediate death. A censored Central Intelligence Agency document dated 28 October 1962, 0200 hours, states "The loss of the U-2 over Banes was probably caused by intercept by an SA-2 from the Banes site, or pilot hypoxia, with the former appearing more likely on the basis of present information." Actually, it was both.

27 October
A U.S. Air Force Boeing RB-47H Stratojet, AF Ser No. 53-6248, of the 55th Strategic Reconnaissance Wing, experiences loss of thrust and crashes at Kindley AFB, Bermuda, killing all four crew: aircraft commander Major William A. Britton, copilot 1st Lieutenant Holt J. Rasmussen, navigator Captain Robert A. Constable, and observer Captain Robert C. Dennis. Cause was contaminated water-alcohol. This aircraft had spotted the Soviet freighter Grozny with missiles bound for Cuba on its deck on 26 September.

30 October
Third prototype Hawker Siddeley P.1127, XP972, first flown 5 April 1962, is severely damaged when the Bristol-Siddeley Pegasus 2 fails following a main bearing seizure during a high-G turn. Hawker's chief experimental test pilot Hugh Merewether attempts forced landing at RAF Tangmere, but the undercarriage collapses, followed by a titanium fire. Pilot escapes unhurt but the airframe is not repaired.

9 November
An engine failure forced Jack McKay, a NASA research pilot, to make an emergency landing at Mud Lake, Nye County, Nevada, in the second North American X-15, AF Ser. No. 56-6671 on flight 2-31-52. The aircraft's landing gear collapsed and the X-15 flipped over on its back. McKay was promptly rescued by an Air Force medical team standing by near the launch site, and eventually recovered to fly the X-15 again. But his injuries, more serious than at first thought, eventually forced his retirement from NASA. The aircraft was sent back to the manufacturer, where it underwent extensive repairs and modifications. It returned to Edwards Air Force Base in February 1964 as the X-15A-2, with a longer fuselage and external fuel tanks.

11 November
A U.S. Air Force Boeing RB-47H Stratojet, AF Ser. No. 53-4297, of the 55th Strategic Reconnaissance Wing, crashes at MacDill AFB, Florida, when the Stratojet loses power on an outboard engine, rolls, and crashes within the confines of the base. All three crew KWF – aircraft commander Captain William E. Wyatt, copilot Captain William C. Maxwell, and navigator 1st Lieutenant Rawl.

22 November
Douglas C-54D-10-DC 7502 of the Portuguese Air Force crashes shortly after take-off from São Tomé International Airport for Portela Airport, Lisbon, Portugal, killing 22 of the 37 people on board.

4 December
A USAF Lockheed C-121G Super Constellation, 54-4066, c/n 4146, operated by MATS, crashes and burns during a landing attempt at Naval Air Station Agana, Guam. Five crew survive, three are presumed dead. No passengers were thought aboard. Names of the crew, all from NAS Moffett Field, California, were not immediately available. The plane, carrying a load of aircraft parts to Guam, left Travis Air Force Base on Friday.

20 December
NASA research pilot Milton O. Thompson, after making an X-15 weather evaluation flight for an impending launch in NASA Lockheed JF-104A-10-LO Starfighter, AF Ser. No. 56-0749, c/n 183-1037, makes simulated X-15 approach at Rogers Dry Lake, Edwards Air Force Base, California, experiences asymmetric flap condition that results in uncommanded roll. Unable to resolve problem by repeatedly cycling the roll and yaw dampers, flap-selector switch and speed brakes, he ejects inverted at 18,000 feet after the airframe makes four complete rolls. Fighter impacts nose first on Edwards bombing range. Pilot descends safely and walks to nearby road where NASA Flight Operations chief Joe Vensel, speeding to the crash site expecting the worst as Thompson had not radioed that he was ejecting, finds him waiting uninjured. Investigation finds that the crash had most likely been the result of an electrical malfunction in the left trailing-edge flap.

26 December
US Navy Martin P5A Marlin 127712 disappears over the Pacific Ocean 350 mi southwest off San Diego, California, with 13 on board.

== 1963 ==
24 January
USAF Boeing B-52C Stratofortress, 53-0406, of the 99th Bombardment Wing, out of Westover AFB, Massachusetts on a low-level flight training mission, commanded by Col. Dante Bulli, 40, of Cherry, Illinois, hits turbulence while flying ~ 100 ft. above the ground as it approached Elephant Mountain near Greenville, Maine, loses vertical fin. Conditions were reported as air speed of 280 knots, outside temperature 14 degrees below zero, with the winds gusting to 40 knots. As the bomber went out of control, the pilot ordered ejection. Only three crew got out: Bulli and Capt. Gerald Adler, 31, of Houston, Texas, survived, though Adler was badly injured. The copilot, Major Robert J. Morrison was killed when he hits a tree while parachuting to the ground. Lt. Col. Joe R. Simpson, Jr, Maj. William W. Gabriel, Maj. Robert J. Hill, Capt. Herbert L. Hansen, Capt. Charles G. Leuchter, and TSgt. Michael F. O'Keefe did not have time to eject, and perished. A Douglas C-54 Skymaster from Goose Bay, Labrador, drops a team of paramedics to aid the two survivors, who are then transported by helicopter to Dow Air Force Base, Bangor, Maine, where they are pronounced to be in "good condition."

30 January
USAF Boeing B-52E Stratofortress, AF Ser. No. 57-0018, of the 6th Bomb Wing from Walker Air Force Base, New Mexico, crashes in snow-covered mountains in northern New Mexico, with at least three crew surviving. Aircraft commander Lt Col Donald L. Hayes, 39, of Alta, Iowa, and another officer walked through heavy snow to a near-by town in search of aid. Survivors, who parachuted from the bomber, include Lt Col Nicholas P. Horangic, 39, radio operator, of Boydtown, Pennsylvania, and Maj Thomas J. McBride, 42, co-pilot, of Panama City, Florida. Horangic was treated for shock and a possible broken left elbow at a Mora, New Mexico hospital. McBride walked to safety and telephoned the base. Three Lockheed T-33 Shooting Stars and, later, three Douglas C-54 Skymaster transports, circled the area trying to locate other survivors. The pilots reported that they saw two other survivors after the first man walked to safety. The crew also included Maj Emil B. A. Goldbeck, 40, navigator, of Kennelworth, New Jersey; Maj George J. Szabo, 44, electronics countermeasures officer, of Columbus, Ohio; and MSgt Burl D. Deas, 39, tail gunner, of Charleston, West Virginia. The vertical fin was torn off in turbulence. The ECM operator and tail gunner were killed.

31 January
Sikorsky HSS-1N Seabat, 140 and 145, both from 8 Squadron of the Royal Netherlands Navy, both ditch near Gibraltar and are lost.

1 February
Over 200 are injured and 73 killed when a Türk Hava Kuvvetleri (Turkish Air Force) Douglas C-47 Skytrain, CBK28, and a Middle East Airlines Vickers 745D Viscount turboprop airliner, OD-ADE, collide in a cloud bank in the afternoon over Ankara, Turkey, the press initially reports. Most of the victims were pedestrians and occupants of buildings lining Ulus Square in the Turkish capital. Eleven passengers and three crew aboard the commercial flight, and three crew aboard the Dakota were included in the fatalities. The C-47 was on a training flight. The body of one its crew was found on top of a building near the square with a partially opened parachute. Later description of the accident reported that the Viscount, Flight Number 265, from Cyprus to Ankara, was descending into Ankara Esenboğa Airport (ESB/LTAC), when it overtook the Dakota, which was returning to Etesmigut Airport. The airliner's number 3 (starboard inner) prop sliced off the Dakota's port horizontal stabilizer, while the starboard side of the Viscount was torn open with some passengers sucked out of the fuselage. An attempt to avoid the Dakota by the Viscount crew at the last moment was unsuccessful. This account gives ground fatalities as 87, and reports conditions as clear.

20 March
McDonnell F3H-2 Demon, BuNo 145281, of VF-14 suffers either cold catapult launch or failure of catapult bridle before launch off USS Franklin D. Roosevelt, CV-42, and goes over the bow. Pilot LTJG Joseph Janiak, Jr. killed, body not recovered. Navy photo captured moment the Demon tipped over the bow.

27 March
North American T-28A Trojan, AF Ser. No. 52-1242, converted to first prototype RA-28 (a proposed turboprop combat version for use in SE Asia), later redesignated North American YAT-28E. To Air Force Special Evaluation Center at Eglin AFB, Florida, for tests. Deficiency in tailfin area (tail unit separated in flight) led to its entering a flat spin and crashing whilst on its 14th test flight, killing North American Aviation pilot George Hoskins when he is unable to bail out due to a jammed canopy.

18 April

A Scottish Aviation Twin Pioneer twin-turboprop aircraft of the No. 152 Squadron RAF crashed at Bu Hafafa in Oman, killing eight people on board.

8 May
A helicopter accident occurred off the USS Yorktown in Manila Harbor, Philippines. The helicopter crashed in the harbor with the loss of all four aboard, including US Naval Academy graduate Myrel Leroy Maxson. The cause of the crash was not determined.

24 May
Central Intelligence Agency pilot Ken Collins is forced to eject from Lockheed A-12, 60–6926, Article 123, during subsonic test flight when aircraft stalls due to inaccurate data being displayed to pilot. Airframe impacts 14 miles (23 km) S of Wendover, Utah. Official cover story refers to it as a Republic F-105 Thunderchief. Cause was found to be pitot-static system failure due to icing. Airframe had made 79 flights for a total time of 136:10 hours.

16 June
During the Paris Air Show, first prototype Hawker Siddeley P.1127, XP831, flown by A. W. "Bill" Bedford, is demonstrating low level hovering when a tiny fragment of debris fouls a nozzle actuating motor causing the aircraft to lose height rapidly and crash. Pilot unhurt and the airframe is repaired. Upon retirement, this historic airframe is preserved in the Sir Sydney Camm Memorial Hall at the RAF Museum, Hendon.

26 June
A BAF Fairchild C-119G Flying Boxcar, CP45, en route to RAF Gütersloh, crashes near Detmold, Germany, after being accidentally hit by a British mortar bomb over the Sennelager Range. 5 crewmen and 33 paratroopers died, while 9 paratroopers managed to jump to safety using their parachutes.

7 July
Marine Corps Reserve pilot Captain John W. Butler, 30, of Boiling Springs, Pennsylvania, suffers electrical failure in North American F-1E Fury BuNo 143609 during ground control intercept mission in a flight with three other aircraft, losing directional instruments, radio contact, at 36,000 feet. Ejects at low altitude after trying everything he can to regain control. Fury strikes ballfield at Green Hill Day Camp, Willow Grove, Pennsylvania, skids 500 yards through some trees, a high hedge, and strikes a bathhouse in which ~30 persons have taken shelter from a severe thunderstorm. Seven on ground are killed, 15 injured.

15 July
Two North American F-100 Super Sabres of the 492d Tactical Fighter Squadron, 48th Tactical Fighter Wing, based at RAF Lakenheath, Suffolk, suffer mid-air collision during routine gunnery exercise on the Holbeach Range, both aircraft coming down in the sea five miles off King's Lynn. Pilot 1st Lt L. C. Marshall parachuted from North American F-100D-45-NH, AF Ser. No. 55-2792, c/n 224-59, rescued from his dinghy by helicopter, but 1st Lt D. F. Ware rode AF Ser. No. 55-2786 to his death.

24 July
U.S. Navy Lt. Cmdr. Hal R. Crandall, assigned to squadron VF-211 (the "Fighting Checkmates"), was killed in the crash of his F-8 Crusader into Subic Bay, Philippines. The plane crashed inverted into the bay with its afterburner on. Conflicting reports blamed the accident on pilot error or a windshear microburst. In 1959 Crandall had been one of the 32 finalists for NASA Astronaut Group 1, but ultimately was not selected.

3 August
An Eglin Air Force Base, Fla., North American T-28 Trojan assigned to Swift Strike III maneuvers crashed south of Winnesboro, S.C., seriously injuring the pilot, Capt. Clyde G. Evans of Fort Walton Beach, Fla. The other occupant, Capt. Frank Dubee, of Eglin Air Force Base, was uninjured. The aircraft was on a mission from Shaw Air Force Base, S.C., and was cruising at 500 feet when its engine apparently failed.

18 August
Twin accidents aboard the USS Constellation (CV-64) kill three. First, a McDonnell F-4B Phantom II, BuNo 149436, of VF-143, snaps arresting cable during night landing, goes over the side, pilot LT Robert J. Craig, 31, of San Diego is lost with his unidentified Radar Intercept Officer, three deck crew injured by whipping cable. Then several hours later, in unrelated accident, Missile Technician 2nd Class Robert William Negus, originally from Lompoc, California, is crushed by a missile, the Navy in San Diego reported.

19 August
A U.S. Air Force Boeing QB-47E Stratojet, of the 3205th Drone Director Group, veers off course on touchdown at Eglin Air Force Base, Florida, crashing onto Eglin Parkway parallel to runway 32/14. Two cars were crushed by the Stratojet, killing two occupants, Robert W. Glass and Dr. Robert Bundy, and injuring a third, Dorothy Phillips. Mr. Glass and Dr. Bundy both worked for the Minnesota Honeywell Corporation at the time, a firm which had just completed flight tests on an inertia guidance sub-system for the X-20 Dyna-Soar project at the base utilizing a McDonnell NF-101B Voodoo. Mrs. Phillips was the wife of Master Sergeant James Phillips, a crew chief at the base. Mrs. Phillips was treated for moderate injuries and released later that day. Both vehicles were destroyed by fire. Four firefighters were treated for smoke inhalation while fighting the blaze which reignited several times. Fire crews had to lay over a mile of hose to reach the crash from the nearest hydrant, as well. The QB-47 was used for Bomarc Missile Program tests, which normally operated from Auxiliary Field Three (Duke Field), approximately 15 miles from the main base, but was diverted to Eglin Main after thunderstorms built up over Duke.

19 August
Two Boeing B-47 Stratojets of the 310th Bombardment Wing (another source claims, incorrectly, the 40th Bombardment Wing) from Schilling AFB, Salina, Kansas, B-47E, 53-2365, and B-47E, 53-6206, collide in mid-air over Irwin, Iowa, during a nine-hour navigation, air-refuelling and radar bomb scoring mission. Bombers depart Schilling at 1125 hrs. and 1126 hrs., then collide in overcast shortly after 1230 hrs., coming down on two farms ~2 miles apart. Two crew DOA at Harlan Hospital, Irwin, Iowa, three treated for injuries, one located alive. SAC identifies three survivors as Capt. Richard M. Smiley, 29, of Arlington, Kansas, aircraft commander of one B-47; Capt. Allan M. Ramsey, Jr., 32, of Bainbridge, Georgia, Smiley's navigator; Capt. Richard M. Snowden, 29, navigator on second B-47. Listed as missing: Capt. Leonard A. Theis, 29, San Fernando, California, co-pilot on second B-47; dead is Capt. Peter J. Macchi, 29, Belleville, New Jersey, Smiley's co-pilot; second fatality not immediately identified. Smiley suffers head injuries, Ramsey, back injuries, and Snowden, burns and leg injuries. It is unclear which crew was on which airframe.

28 August
Two Boeing KC-135A Stratotankers, 61-0319 and 61-0322, assigned with the 19th Bomb Wing, collide over the Atlantic between Bermuda and Nassau, all eleven crew aboard the two jets lost (6 on 0319 and 5 on 0322). Debris and oil slicks found ~750 miles ENE of Miami, Florida. Aircraft were returning to Homestead AFB, Florida after mission to refuel two Boeing B-47 Stratojets from Schilling AFB, Kansas (both of which landed safely) when contact with them was lost. Search suspended Monday night, 2 September 1963, when wreckage recovered by the Air Rescue Service is positively identified as being from the missing tankers.

5 September
A North American AF-1E Fury, BuNo 143560, of VF-725, Naval Reserve, based at NAS Glenview, Illinois, suffers engine failure, pilot Lt. Don J. "Skip" Mellem ejects through canopy and survives. Fighter strikes front of home in Northbrook, just off the base, woman escapes out the backdoor, survives.

14 September
Sikorsky HSS-1N Seabat, 142 of 8 Squadron of the Royal Netherlands Navy, is heavily damaged while being moved by elevator to the flight deck aboard the Hr. Ms. Karel Doorman. Repairs undertaken by Henschel.

22 September
MATS Douglas C-133A Cargomaster, 56-2002, of the 1607th Air Transport Wing, with ten personnel of the 1st Air Transport Squadron on board, is lost in the Atlantic Ocean on a flight from Dover AFB, Delaware to the Azores when contact is lost some 57 minutes after a 0233 EDT take-off from Dover. Last reported position was ~30 miles off of Cape May, New Jersey.

2 October
Second of two Short SC.1 VTOL experimental testbeds, XG905, a compact tailless delta monoplane with five Rolls-Royce RB108 engines, one for propulsion and four for lift, crashes while attempting landing at Belfast, Northern Ireland. Gyros failed, producing false references which caused the auto-stabiliser system to fly the aircraft into the ground. The failure occurred at less than 30 feet, giving pilot J.R. Green no time to revert to manual control. Airframe impacted inverted, killing pilot.

10 November
SAC Boeing WB-47E Stratojet, 51-2420, built as B-47E-60-BW and modified to weather reconnaissance variant, making emergency landing at Lajes Air Base, Azores, skids into parking ramp, strikes Boeing C-97C Stratofreighter, 50-0690, loses port inner engine nacelle (numbers 2 and 3), starboard outer nacelle (number 6) and starboard wingtip. Fire damages port inner wing above lost nacelle. Crew survives.

20 November
Tenth Lockheed U-2A, Article 350, 56–6683, delivered to the CIA on 24 April 1956, converted to U-2F by spring 1963; loaned to SAC for Cuba overflight missions, crashes into the Gulf of Mexico 40 miles (64 km) NW of Key West, Florida, killing pilot Capt. Joe Hyde, Jr. Pilot was returning from a Brass Knob mission and was hand-flying the aircraft back to Barksdale Air Force Base, Louisiana, at 69,000 feet (21,000 m) after failure of autopilot when it entered a flat spin and impacted in the Gulf. Wreckage retrieved from shallow water near Florida coast but ejection seat, seat pack and parachute missing – pilot never found.

22 November

Aérospatiale Alouette III helicopter of the Indian Air Force, on an inspection tour crashed in Poonch district en route to Poonch town, killing all six people on board. Six distinguished officers of the Indian Armed Forces were on board, including three general officers, an air officer and a brigadier.

10 December
USAF test pilot Colonel Chuck Yeager out of Edwards Air Force Base, California, zoom climbs Lockheed NF-104A Starfighter, AF Ser. No. 56-0762, modified with rocket engine in tail unit, to 106,300 feet (32,400 m), but aircraft enters flat spin when directional jets in nose run out of propellant, forcing him to eject. He suffers injuries when his helmet collides with the ejection seat. This mission was very loosely depicted in the film The Right Stuff. Aircraft was originally built as Lockheed F-104A-10-LO. See also flying accident during a test flight.

== 1964 ==
2 January
A U.S. Air Force Douglas C-124C Globemaster II, 52-968, of the 28th Air Transport Squadron, en route from Tachikawa Air Force Base near Tokyo, Japan, to Hickam Air Force Base, Honolulu, Hawaii with nine on board and 11 tons of cargo, disappears over the Pacific Ocean after making a fuel stop at Wake Island. Due at Hickam at 0539 hrs. EST, the Globemaster II is last heard from at 0159 hrs. EST. Fuel exhaustion would have been at 1000 hrs. EST and the aircraft is presumed down at sea. An automatic SOS signal is detected emanating from an aircraft-type radio with a constant carrier frequency of 4728 kHz, issuing an automatically keyed distress message, and a dozen aircraft of the Air Force, Navy and Coast Guard are sent to search from Hickam and from Guam, Midway, and Johnston Island. Poor weather and limited visibility hampers search efforts. The U.S. Navy's USS Lansing also participates in the search. The eight missing Air Force crew and one U.S. Navy man escorting a body back to the U. S. are officially declared dead on 21 January. This was the first C-124 accident since May 1962.

4 January
USAF Martin NRB-57D Canberra, 53-3973, of the Wright Air Development Center, Wright-Patterson AFB, Ohio, suffers structural failure of both wings at 50,000 feet (15240 m), comes down in schoolyard at Dayton, Ohio, crew bails out. The U.S. Air Force subsequently grounds all W/RB-57D aircraft.

6 January
A U.S. Navy pilot ejects from a Douglas A-4C Skyhawk shortly after departing NAS Oceana, Virginia, when the fighter-bomber catches fire. Lt. J.G. J. R. Mossman, 24, of Springfield, Pennsylvania, is alerted by his wingman that the tail is on fire just after beginning a flight to NAS Pensacola, Florida, and ejects 10 miles SE of Virginia Beach, Virginia, parachuting into the Atlantic Ocean. Wingman Lt. Henri B. Chase orbits Mossman's position until a helicopter from NAS Norfolk arrives and picks him up. The pilot is unhurt. "By coincidence, Mossman is one of three pilots who last month practiced being rescued at sea by helicopter off Virginia Beach."

10 January
The Dassault Balzac V crashes on its 125th sortie, during a low-altitude hover. During a vertical descent the aircraft experienced uncontrollable divergent wing oscillations, the port wing eventually striking the ground at an acute angle with the aircraft rolling over because of the continued lift engine thrust. The loss was attributed to loss of control because the stabilising limits of the three-axis autostabilisation system's 'puffer pipes' were exceeded in roll. Although airframe damage was relatively light, the Centre D'Essai en Vol test pilot, Jacques Pinier, did not eject and died in the crash.

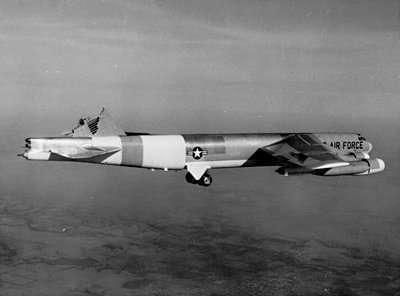
B-52H, 61-023, configured at the time as a testbed to investigate structural failures, still flying after its vertical stabilizer sheared off in severe turbulence on 10 January 1964. The aircraft landed safely.

10 January
Boeing civilian test pilot Chuck Fisher and his three man crew lose the vertical fin of Boeing B-52H Stratofortress, 61-023, in turbulence at ~ 14,000 ft. over northern New Mexico's Sangre de Christo mountains. A North American F-100 Super Sabre flying out of Wichita, Kansas and a Boeing KC-135 Stratotanker are launched to escort the bomber, and due to high winds at Wichita the decision is made to land at Blytheville AFB, Blytheville, Arkansas. After six hours of careful preparation, including the launch of another B-52 to test various landing configuration options, the damaged Stratofortress is successfully landed. It was repaired and returned to service until retired from operations with the 2d Bomb Wing in 2008 and subsequently scrapped, Barksdale Air Force Base.

13 January
A U.S. Air Force Boeing B-52D Stratofortress, 55-060, "Buzz One Four", of the 484th Bomb Wing, Turner AFB, Georgia, suffers structural failure in turbulence of winter storm as blizzard socks the East Coast, crashes approximately 17 miles SW of Cumberland, Maryland. The bomber comes down in a small valley on Elbow Mountain in a state park. Pilot, co-pilot, eject, survive. Navigator, tail gunner, eject, die of exposure. Radar nav fails to eject, rides airframe in with two nuclear weapons on board. The pilot, Maj. Thomas W. McCormick, 42, of Hawkey, West Virginia, telephoned the Air Force in Washington, D.C. from a farmhouse near Grantsville, Maryland, saying that he was apparently the last of his crew to bail out, having heard the other seats leave the aircraft before he ejected. The US Army sends a 15-man team of bomb disposal experts from Fort Meade, Maryland, and the USAF dispatches a 35-man rescue team from Andrews AFB, Maryland. Both bombs survive intact and are recovered. The Stratofortress was also carrying two AGM-28 Hound Dog air-to-ground missiles. The aircraft was returning from a 24 Hour Airborne Alert mission (referred to a "Chrome Dome" mission) diverted to Westover AFB in Massachusetts for repair of inflight maintenance issues, spending the night at Westover before returning to Turner AFB.

22 January
A U.S. Air Force Lockheed F-104B Starfighter, 57‑1306, of the 319th Fighter Interceptor Squadron, Air Defense Command, Homestead Air Force Base, Florida, crashes at ~1330 hrs. on Santa Rosa Island, ~one mile E of Fort Walton Beach, Florida, shortly after departure from Eglin Air Force Base, Florida, to return to Homestead. The pilot, Capt. Lucius O. Evans, ejects safely just before the fighter impacts in sand dunes just short of the Coronado Motor Hotel, parachuting into the Choctawhatchee Bay. He is then transported to the Eglin base hospital by Assistant Police Chief Jack McSwain, where he is reported to have sustained no injuries. Over sixty occupants at the hotel are not injured although flaming wreckage sprays an area close to the business. Eyewitness Andrew Christiansen, of Chester, Connecticut, reported that the aircraft was on fire as it descended and observed Capt. Evans' ejection from the Starfighter. A secondary explosion after the impact further scatters the burning wreckage.

28 January
An unarmed USAF North American CT-39A Sabreliner, 62-4448, the first Air Force T-39, of the 7101st Air Base Wing, departed Wiesbaden, West Germany, at 14:10 on a routine three-hour training flight. Shot down over Erfurt, Germany, by two Soviet MiG-19s after errantly entering Soviet airspace over East Germany. All three crewmembers were killed.

11 February
During an evening airpower demonstration, a Douglas B-26 Invader on a strafing pass over Range 52 at Eglin AFB, Florida, loses a wing as it pulls up at ~1945 hrs., with the loss of two crew, both assigned to the 1st Air Commando Wing, Hurlburt Field. Killed while flying (KWF) are pilot Capt. Herman S. Moore, 34, of 28 Palmetto Drive, Mary Esther, Florida, and navigator Capt. Lawrence L. Lively, 31, of 19 Azalea Drive, Mary Esther, Florida. Moore, originally of Livingston, Montana is survived by his widow, Nancy Lee Moore, and a stepson, John H. Duckworth, 9, and his parents, Mr. and Mrs. William N. Moore, 117 South 10th Street, Livingston. Mrs. Moore is a teacher in the Okaloosa County School system. Lively is survived by his widow, Joan R. Lively. The Invader was participating in a demonstration of the Special Air Warfare Center's counter insurgency capabilities, an activity that had been presented on average of twice each month for the past 21 months. This was the first such accident for SAWC during that period. The USAF subsequently grounds all combat B-26s on 8 April as the stress of operations now exceed the airframes' abilities. On Mark Engineering Company remanufactures 40 old airframes as one YB-26K and 39 B-26Ks with new spars, larger engines and rudders, and new 1964 fiscal year serial numbers which see use in Southeast Asia, and which will be redesignated A-26As for political reasons. The YB-26K was upgraded to full B-26K standard.

March
The sole Lockheed U-2G, 56-6695, Article 362, the second airframe of the first USAF U-2 order, delivered in November 1956 to the Air Force at Groom Lake, to the 4080th Strategic Reconnaissance Wing at Laughlin AFB, Texas, in June 1957; transferred to the CIA in mid-1963 and converted to a U-2G by December with a tailhook in lieu of a braking parachute. Utilized for carrier qualifications aboard USS Kitty Hawk and USS Ranger in 1964 off the coast of California, carrying spurious tail markings ONR and faux registration N315X. In early March, Detachment G pilot Jim Barnes approaches the Ranger too slowly and stalls just over the fantail. Despite advancing the throttle, the airframe strikes the deck, right wing low, tearing off the skid on one of the arrestor cables. The aircraft becomes airborne again, narrowly missing the island amidships, and despite an aileron partially jammed in the up position, the pilot is able to climb away and return to North Base at Edwards Air Force Base, California. The U-2 is repaired with a reinforcing metal plate added to the front of the wingtip skids and springs added to their base.

3 March
The port side cargo door of a Lockheed C-130B Hercules, 61-961, explosively blows off the aircraft at 19,000 feet above the Smoky Mountain resort town of Gatlinburg, Tennessee, carrying one crewman to his death and another hanging onto a chain outside the aircraft as the fuselage decompresses. Crew chief Jose Gallegoes, 32, was holding a length of chain attached to his bolted-down tool box when the access door blew off. "Something like an explosion happened and I found myself hanging out of the plane", the San Luis, Colorado man said later. "I was hanging by the chain with which I was securing the tool box. That chain saved my life", he said. His fellow crewmen pulled him back inside the cargo plane, but there was nothing they could do for the as yet unidentified crewman who fell to his death on the mountainous slopes below, ~35 miles E of Knoxville, Tennessee. He had no parachute. A search was begun for his body. The departing door also sheared off the number two (port inner) propeller. The pilot, Flt. Lt. David W. Parsons, an RAF exchange officer from Wellington, England, was circling over McGhee Tyson Air Force Base when the door gave way. He immediately initiated an emergency landing, but found that he had no hydraulic control for the nose gear, touching down on the main gear before the Hercules settled onto its nose, skidding ~5,000 feet along the runway before coming to a halt. None of the seven crew remaining aboard were hurt. The C-130 was en route from Sewart Air Force Base, at Smyrna, Tennessee to Myrtle Beach Air Force Base, South Carolina, when the accident occurred. Most of the plane's parachutes were stacked near the door and were carried over the side by the decompression. Sheriff Ray Noland stated that an open parachute was seen drifting down near Sevierville, Tennessee, and deputies searching for the crewman's body found a parachute, a seat and the door ~two miles N of state highway 73, E of Gatlinburg.

9 March
An armed U. S. Army Bell HU-1B Huey escorting U. S. Secretary of Defense Robert S. McNamara into "the heart of the Communist-infested Mekong River Delta" in South Vietnam, crashes into the Bassac River, killing the enlisted door gunners, who apparently drown. The helicopter goes down just as McNamara lands in another chopper with Maj. Gen. Hguyen Khanh, head of South Vietnam's military government. The Huey's engine apparently stalls, losing power just as the helicopter executes a sharp sweeping turn upward after making a low level pass over some trees while looking for snipers. The Huey plunges into the river, sinks immediately, with loss of the gunners. The officer-pilots escape and are rescued. In hospital they are found to have suffered only minor injuries. Some members of the SecDef's party witness the accident but McNamara does not. He states later that he is "grieved beyond words" over the loss.

15 March
A Blue Angels pilot is killed during an attempted emergency landing at Apalach Airport near Apalachicola, Florida when his Grumman F-11A Tiger, BuNo 141883 (?), experiences difficulties while transiting from West Palm Beach, Florida back to the Blue Angels home base at NAS Pensacola, Florida. Lt. George L. Neale, 29, who flew in the Number Four slot position of the diamond formation, was returning from a demonstration at West Palm Beach with one other of the six team jets and a Douglas R5D Skymaster support plane when he radios Tyndall Air Force Base, near Panama City, Florida, for emergency landing permission when he suffers mechanical problems S of Apalachicola. But, spotting the local airport, he attempts a landing there, ejecting on final approach at 1115 hrs. as the fighter comes down ~250 yards short of the runway. Although he clears the airframe at ~150–200 feet altitude, his chute does not have sufficient time to deploy and he is killed. He is survived by his wife Donna, of Pensacola, Florida, and his mother, Mrs. Katherine Neale, of Avalon, Pennsylvania. The Navy said that the cause of the accident is being investigated.

23 March
Armstrong Whitworth Argosy C.1, XP413, of 105 Squadron, deployed to RAF Khormaksar, Aden, ditches in the Aden harbour whilst on finals to the easterly runway at Khormaksar, when, during crew training, the number four (starboard outer) engine was shut down for practice. Due to confusion in the cockpit, the crew manage to shut down both starboard engines without feathering either and the Argosy comes down with remarkably little damage, settling on its undercarriage in about 5 feet (1.5 m.) of water. Hauled onto dry land, it is eventually shipped back to the UK by boat, refurbished by Hawker Siddeley, and returned to duty.

1 April
In an unusual accident, the Number Three deck elevator of the USS Randolph tears loose from the ship during night operations in rough seas and plunges into the Atlantic off Cape Henry, Virginia, taking with it a Grumman S-2D Tracker of VS-36, five crewmen, and a tractor. Three crew are rescued by the USS Holder, but two are lost at sea.

5 April
A United States Marine Corps Vought RF-8A Crusader, BuNo 146891, returning from Kadena Air Base, Okinawa to its home base of Naval Air Facility Atsugi, Kanagawa Prefecture suffered a mechanical malfunction and crashed into a residential neighborhood in Machida, Tokyo, Japan. The crash killed four people and injured 32 others on the ground. The pilot, Captain R. L. Bown, of Seattle, Washington, successfully ejected at 5,000 feet, landed on a car, suffered only bruising. Japanese media questioned why Bown was not able to steer the aircraft away from the residential area before ejecting.

9 May
A Republic F-105B Thunderchief, 57-5801, Thunderbird 2, one of nine delivered to the Thunderbirds demonstration team in mid-April 1964, suffers structural failure and disintegrates during 6G tactical pitch up for landing at airshow at Hamilton AFB, California, killing pilot Capt. Eugene J. Devlin. The failure of the fuselage's upper spine causes the USAF to ground all F-105s and retrofit the fleet with a structural brace, but the air demonstration team reverts to the North American F-100 Super Sabre and never flies another show in F-105s.

11 May
A U.S. Air Force Boeing C-135B Stratolifter, 61-0332, crashed on landing at Clark Air Force Base, Philippines, after striking a 42-foot pole a quarter mile short of the runway, and hitting a taxi. 84 on board, 5 survivors, passengers in taxi also killed. Date of 11 August 1964 cited by Joe Baugher. The crash occurred while attempting to land during a rainstorm at approximately 1920 hrs. The Air Force said that five of the crew members survived because the nose of the plane broke off of the flaming fuselage.

12 May
"Ten navy flyers escaped today when their patrol plane was forced to ditch in the Sea of Japan off Oki Island. A Japanese ship picked up all ten."

26 May
A USAF Boeing B-47E Stratojet, 53-2296, of the 509th Bomb Wing, inbound to RAF Upper Heyford from Pease AFB, New Hampshire, suffers uneven throttle advance on attempted go around, port engines fail to respond, wing drops and bomber cartwheels between two loaded B-47s before striking storage building which the day before had contained JATO bottles. Prompt response by rescue personnel and apparatus douse the fire and three of four crew are pulled from the wreckage alive: pilot Capt. Robert L. Lundin, North Platte, Nebraska, co-pilot 1st Lt. James V. Mullen, Des Moines, Iowa, and passenger Lt. Col. Robert E. Johnson, Los Angeles, California. Navigator Capt. Lowell L. Mittlestadt, 27, of Elmhurst, Illinois, is KWF. One firefighter is hospitalized after being overcome from smoke and a dozen others are treated for minor injuries and smoke while fighting the blaze.

5 June
U.S. Navy Douglas A-4E Skyhawk, BuNo 149997, of VA-86, assigned at NAS Oceana, Virginia, goes down in the Chesapeake Bay just west of the Tangier Island Navy target range. Pilot A. A. Less ejects and is picked up uninjured by a crash boat and conveyed to Patuxent River Naval Hospital, NAS Patuxent River, Maryland, for a routine examination. Less lives with his family in Virginia Beach, Virginia. VA-86 had begun operating the A-4E model on 28 April 1964.

10 June
First Lockheed XV-4A Hummingbird, 62-4503, (originally designated VZ-10) crashes, killing civilian Department of the Army test pilot William "Bill" Ingram, of Newport News, Virginia. Aircraft had just transitioned from conventional to vertical flight at 3,000 feet (914 m) when control was lost. Airframe came down between Dobbins AFB and Woodstock, on Verney Drive in the Addison Heights subdivision of Cobb County, Georgia, injuring one civilian on ground.

9 July
Lockheed test pilot Bill Park ejects safely from Lockheed A-12, 60–6939, Article 133, on approach to Groom Dry Lake, Nevada during test flight after total hydraulic failure. Park ejects laterally at 200 feet altitude on approach. The cause of the accident was temperature gradients in the outboard elevon serve valve. The aircraft had made ten flights for a total of 8.17 hours.

15 July
A Soviet Tupolev Tu-16R "Badger" crashes in the Sea of Japan. In April 1995, during working group sessions, the U.S. side passed over the deck logs of the USS Bennington from 1 July 1964 to 31 July 1964, the deck log of the USS Cunningham from 14 July 1964 to 16 July 1964 and the deck log of the USS Eversole from 14 July 1964 to 16 July 1964. These deck logs all pertain to the crash of the "Badger".

27 July
A Lockheed F-104F (Starfighter) crashes between Hesel and Remels in Ostfriesland, Germany. After a broken left landing-flap the aircraft became uncontrollable. Both Italian pilots, Capt. Antonio Stura and Capt. Mario Arpino, ejected safely.

12 August
While involved in Soviet Air Force testing, Kamov Ka-22, OI-03, enters an uncontrolled turn to the right, and in efforts to correct the Ka-22 pitched into a steep dive. The order is given to abandon the aircraft, and three of the crew survive, but Col S. G. Brovtsev, who was flying, and technician A. F. Rogov, are killed.

14 August
Lockheed U-2A, 56-6955, Article 395, fifth and last airframe of the USAF supplementary production, delivered to the USAF in March 1959. Assigned to the 4080th Strategic Reconnaissance Wing, Laughlin AFB, Texas. Crashed near Boise, Idaho, this date. ROCAF pilot successfully ejects.

25 August
”A T-29 transport plane landed short of the Offutt Air Force Base runway during the thunderstorm Tuesday night and was damaged extensively. None of the personnel was injured. The plane was returning from a training mission when it clipped a high-voltage power line southeast of the runway, struck a railroad track and settled on the southeast-northwest runway. A five-mile area was blacked out before the power-line damage was repaired.”

14 September
First prototype EWR VJ 101C, X-1, D-9517, an experimental German jet fighter VTOL aircraft (VJ stood for "Vertikal Jäger" – German for "Vertical Fighter"), crashes on its 132nd flight after an uncommanded roll immediately after a normal horizontal take-off, but EWR's American test pilot George Bright escapes using Martin-Baker Mk. GA7 zero-zero ejection seat. The pilot ejected at an altitude of ten feet, suffering a crushed vertebrae. The accident was found to have been caused by a roll-rate gyro which had been installed with reversed polarity.

21 September
During delivery flight of North American XB-70A Valkyrie, 62-0001, from Palmdale, California to Edwards Air Force Base, California, on touchdown the brakes on the main gear lock up and the friction causes the eight tires and wheels to burn. The Valkyrie was otherwise undamaged.

14 October
Boeing KB-50K Superfortress, 48-065, of the 421st Air Refueling Squadron, Takhli RTAFB, crashes in Thailand shortly after takeoff on training mission while supporting Yankee missions over Laos. Corrosion found in wreckage led to early retirement of the KB-50 fleet and its replacement with Boeing KC-135s.

20 October
Two Saab J-29 fighters of the Austrian Air Force ("Red E", 29559, and "Yellow F", 29449) fly off course on a training mission and into Czechoslovak airspace, where they made a forced landing after running out of fuel. Both pilots survive, but both aircraft are written off.

31 October
NASA astronaut Theodore Freeman is killed when a goose smashes through the cockpit canopy of his Northrop T-38A Talon jet trainer, 63-8188, at Ellington AFB, Texas. Flying shards of Plexiglas enter the jet engine intake, causing the engine to flame out. Freeman ejects but is too close to the ground for his parachute to open properly. He was posthumously awarded the Purple Heart.

31 October
Tornado collapses hangar of 1° Gruppo Elicotteri (First Helicopter Group), Italian Navy, at the Naval Air Station at Maristaeli Catania, destroying five Sikorsky SH-34G Seabat: MM143899, MM143940, MM143949, MM80163 and MM80164.

11 November
French Aéronavale Lockheed P2V-6M Neptune, (BuNo) 134663, c/n 6060, hits a hill and bursts into flames while circling to land at Heraklion Airport, Heraklion, Crete. Nine are killed and four seriously injured. "A French embassy spokesman in Athens said the twin-engine plane, coming from France, carried naval officers on a training flight. They were scheduled to remain in Iraklion until Monday for inauguration ceremonies in which a street is to be named after a French war hero who died in the defense of Crete in World War II."

27 November
A Lockheed SP-2H Neptune, BuNo 135610, coded "YC 12", of VP-2, out of NAS Kodiak, crashes into a mountain near the tip of Cape Newenham, Alaska. Twelve crew members killed.

2 December
SAC Boeing B-47E Stratojet, 53-2398, of the 380th Bomb Wing, suffers collapse of forward main gear unit, skids off right side of runway at Plattsburgh AFB, New York, crew escapes safely. Airframe struck off charge 13 January 1965.

5 December
An LGM-30B Minuteman I missile is on strategic alert at Launch Facility (LF) L-02, Ellsworth AFB, South Dakota, when two airmen are dispatched to the LF to repair the inner zone (IZ) security system. In the midst of their checkout of the IZ system, one retrorocket in the spacer below the Reentry Vehicle (RV) fires, causing the RV to fall about 75 feet to the floor of the silo. When the RV strikes bottom, the arming and fusing/altitude control subsystem containing the batteries are torn loose, thus removing all sources of power from the RV. The RV structure receives considerable damage. All safety devices operate properly in that they do not sense the proper sequence of events to allow arming the warhead. There is no detonation or radioactive contamination.

8 December
U.S. Air Force Convair B-58A Hustler, 60-1116, of the 305th Bomb Wing, taxiing for take-off on icy taxiway at Bunker Hill AFB, Indiana, is blown off the pavement by exhaust of another departing Convair B-58 Hustler, strikes a concrete manhole box adjacent to the runway, landing gear collapses, burns. Navigator killed in failed ejection, two other crew okay. Four B43 nuclear bombs and either a W39 or W53 warhead are on board the weapons pod, but no explosion takes place and contamination is limited to crash site.

10 December
U.S. Air Force B-67 weather plane crashes on takeoff at Patrick Air Force Base, Florida. Pilot and NCO passenger headed to NCO Academy killed. Leaves 9 children without a father.

== 1965 ==
16 January
A U.S. Air Force Boeing KC-135A Stratotanker, 57-1442, crashed after an engine failure shortly after take off from McConnell Air Force Base, Kansas, US. The fuel-laden plane crashed at the intersection of 20th and Piatt in Wichita, Kansas, causing a huge fire. 30 were killed, 23 on the ground and the 7-member crew. The aircraft was assigned to the 902d Air Refueling Squadron, 4123d Strategic Wing based at Clinton-Sherman AFB, in Oklahoma. The aircraft had just completed a scheduled Factory Maintenance Visit at the Boeing facility in Wichita.

16 January
U.S. Navy LCDR. Dick Oliver crashes Grumman F-11A Tiger, Blue Angel Number 5, BuNo 141869, doing a dirty roll during practice, but receives minor injuries. The new aircraft 5 became BuNo 141859, which he flies on the European tour. Oliver will be killed in a crash during a performance at Toronto, Canada, on 2 September 1966.

26 February
U.S. Air Force Boeing B-47E Stratojet, 52-0171, collides with Boeing KC-135A Stratotanker, 63-8882, during midair refuelling 410 mi. SSE of Ernest Harmon AFB, Newfoundland, both aircraft lost.

19 March
Final Hawker Siddeley P.1127 prototype (of six), XP984, first with new swept wing with leading edge extensions and steel cold nozzles, first flown in October 1963, is damaged in a forced landing at Thorney Island. Repaired.

21 March
Second (of five) Ling-Temco-Vought XC-142A VTOL transports, 62-5922, crashes at the Vought facility at NAS Dallas, Texas, while flying at 24 mph at an altitude of 10 to 20 feet, striking the ground first with the port wingtip, then with the starboard wingtip, before making a hard landing. The wing at the time was at an angle of 45 degrees with the flaps deflected at 60 degrees. Wingtips, ailerons and outboard engine tailpipes are damaged, but crew is uninjured. Recirculated propwash airflow caused by combination of wing tilt and flap deflection produced large erratic aerodynamic disturbances and loss of directional stability. Aircraft is repaired.

1 April
Tripartite Evaluation Squadron Hawker Siddeley Kestrel FGA.1, XS696, catches fire on take-off at RAF West Raynham and crashes.

3 April
Following the first combat intercept mission flown by the Không quân Nhân dân Việt Nam (Vietnam People's Air Force), six MiG-17s of the Trung đoàn Không quân Tiêm kích 921 (921st Fighter Regiment) against a mixed force of U.S. Navy Vought F-8 Crusaders and Douglas A-4 Skyhawks attacking the Hàm Rồng rail bridges, "the flight leader, Pham Ngoc Lan, got separated from his men and his compass failed. Having trained in the area during his basic flight instruction, he had a rough idea where he was and with his fuel supply dwindling, he set up to make a crash landing on the banks of the Duong River south of Hanoi. Ignoring his ground controller's order to bail out, Pham Ngoc Lan wanted to try and save the MiG knowing that there were only a small number operational with the VPAF. Missing a sampan by only a few feet, his aircraft skipped along the water and knocked him unconscious before coming to rest on a mud flat. When he came to, he found himself surrounded by a local Vietnamese militia pointing their guns at him, thinking he was a downed American pilot. Despite showing them his identity papers, it took a local village elder to defuse the situation. Given that Pham Ngoc Lan was born and raised originally in the South, his accent made him sound like he was from South Vietnam which complicated matters. Before long a helicopter from his base arrived to retrieve him and the MiG was also recovered and put back into service, a testament to the toughness of the design. Returning his base, he found out that the other men of his flight had managed to land safely." Since that day in 1965, the Vietnamese government made the third of April a public holiday called "Air Force Day".

9 April
Four McDonnell Douglas F-4B Phantom IIs of VF-96, CVW-9, launch on a BARCAP mission from USS Ranger, but the leader of the second element, Lt. Cdr. William Greer, in F-4B-16-MC, BuNo 151425, loses an engine on launch and the fighter bellyflops into the sea, both crew ejecting. This was VF-96's first loss of the war.

27 April
Ryan XV-5A Vertifan, 62-4505, noses over from 800 feet (244 m) and crashes at Edwards Air Force Base, California, during a demonstration in front of several hundred reporters, military personnel, and civilians. Ryan test pilot Willis Louis "Lou" Everett, flying at 180 knots, prepares to transition from conventional flight to fan mode but the aircraft unexpectedly pitches down. Everett attempts low-altitude ejection but seat fails, his chute snags on the high tail, and he is killed.

4 May
USAF Convair F-106B Delta Dart, 57-2528, suffers a mid-air collision with F-106A, 57-4721, both assigned to the 539th Fighter-Interceptor Squadron, McGuire AFB, New Jersey, the second fighter being lost and 2528 recovering to NAFEC Atlantic City, New Jersey. It will later crash on 16 October 1972 while assigned to the 4756th Air Defense Wing, Tyndall AFB, Florida.

16 May
While waiting to take off on a mission, a B-57B Canberra jet bomber explodes on the ground at Bien Hoa Air Base, Vietnam. This sets off a chain of secondary explosions that destroy 21 other airplanes at the base, kill 27 U.S. Air Force personnel, and injure 99 people. Among the dead was 34-year-old USAF Major Robert G. Bell, who in 1959 had been one of the 32 finalists for NASA Astronaut Group 1. Sabotage was ruled out, and the accident was eventually traced to a loose turbine on the B-57B hitting the fuse of an armed 500 lb bomb.

4 June
A U.S. Air Force Fairchild C-119G Flying Boxcar is destroyed in crash in field near the turnpike in Sabattus, Maine, after double engine failure. Crew bails out and is uninjured.

11 June
F-102A jet interceptor explodes on test flight from Wright-Patterson Air Force Base. The pilot, USAF Maj. Alexander Kratz Rupp, is killed. Accident was caused by material failure leading to breakage of the left wing, which had been reused from another aircraft. In 1963 Rupp had been one of the 34 finalists for NASA Astronaut Group 3, but ultimately was not selected.

18 June
USAF Lockheed NF-104A Starfighter, 56-0756, assigned to Air Force Systems Command Test Pilot School, Edwards Air Force Base, California, suffers rocket oxidizer explosion this date, blowing off portion of the tail, pilot landed safely. Repaired and flown again.

18 June
On the very first Operation Arc Light mission flown by Boeing B-52 Stratofortress aircraft of SAC to hit a target in South Vietnam, a total of 30 B-52Fs depart Andersen AFB, Guam just after midnight, flying in ten cells of three aircraft, to hit a suspected Viet Cong stronghold in the Bến Cát District, 40 miles N of Saigon. Unexpected tailwinds from a typhoon cause the bombers to arrive seven minutes early at their refuelling point with KC-135 tankers over the South China Sea at a point between South Vietnam and the island of Luzon. The three planes of Green Cell, in the lead, begin a 360 degree turn to make their rendezvous, and in doing so cross the path of Blue Cell and directly towards oncoming Yellow Cell. In the darkness, B-52F 57-0047 and 57-0179, both aircraft of the 441st Bombardment Squadron, 320th Bombardment Wing, Mather AFB, California, but flown by crews assigned to the 20th Bombardment Squadron, 7th Bomb Wing, Carswell AFB, Texas and attached to the 3960th Strategic Wing, Andersen AFB, Guam, collided, killing eight crew, with four survivors, plus one body recovered. The four are located and picked up by a Grumman HU-16A Albatross amphibian, 51-5287, but it is damaged on take-off by a heavy sea state and those on board have to transfer to a Norwegian freighter and a Navy vessel, the Albatross sinking thereafter. Another B-52 loses a hydraulic pump and radar, cannot rendezvous with the tankers and aborts to Okinawa. Twenty-seven Stratofortresses drop on a one-mile by two-mile target box from between 19,000 and 22,000 feet, a little more than 50 percent of the bombs falling within the target zone. The force returns to Andersen except for one bomber with electrical problems that recovers to Clark AFB, the mission having lasted 13 hours. Post-strike assessment by teams of South Vietnamese troops with American advisors find evidence that the VC had departed the area before the raid, and it is suspected that infiltration of the south's forces have tipped off the north because of the ARVN troops involved in the post-strike inspection. Note: The Operational Requirements, required the crews and aircraft from two Bombardment Wings and the crews often flew aircraft from the other deployed Bombardment Wing.

25 June
A U.S. Air Force Boeing C-135A Stratolifter, 60-0373, out of McGuire AFB, New Jersey, crashes after 0135 hrs. take off in fog and light drizzle from MCAS El Toro, California, USA. Pilot flew into Loma Ridge at 0146. 84 died. Aircraft was bound for Okinawa.

6 July
After takeoff from RAF Abingdon, Oxfordshire, England, RAF Handley Page Hastings C.1 TG577 suddenly pitches up at an altitude of approximately 2,000 feet (610 m), turns left, and dives to the earth, killing all 41 British servicemen aboard. Investigators determine that the right-hand elevator became uncontrollable when two bolts in the mechanism failed from metal fatigue; the entire Hastings fleet is subsequently grounded for modifications.

11 July
A U.S. Air Force Lockheed EC-121H Warning Star, 55–136, of the 551st AEWCW, out of Otis AFB, Massachusetts, develops a fire in the number three (starboard inner) engine, attempts ditching in the North Atlantic ~100 miles E of Nantucket, Massachusetts. Night touchdown in zero-zero weather, while on fire, proves difficult, aircraft crashes and breaks apart. Of the 19 people on board, three crew members survive, 16 die. Seven of the crew bodies are never recovered.

10 August
A Virginia Air Guard Cessna L-19 Bird Dog crashes at Camp Pickett, Virginia, while flying a support mission for forces in summer field training, killing the crew. Pilot Capt. Laurence A. White and S/Sgt. Melvin D. Mangum, both of the Richmond Howitzers, are killed while flying (KWF) when the liaison aircraft comes down near the Nottoway River reservoir.

10 August
A fire in a Martin LGM-25C Titan II missile silo at Searcy, Arkansas kills 53 men, all of them civilians, in the worst accident in "U.S. space age defense" when a diesel generator catches fire, smothering the victims. The missile, fully loaded with liquid fuel, did not burn. Its nuclear warhead had been removed while the civilian workmen updated the physical plant of the complex. Two civilians were able to flee the fire area through a tunnel to the access rooms and launch center. "The fire probably burned less than an hour", said Capt. Douglas Wood, Public Information Officer for Little Rock Air Force Base, which commands the 18 Titan II silos ringing Central Arkansas, "but up to 12 hours later smoke was still billowing in the silo."

17 August
Sikorsky HSS-1N Seabat, 136, of the Royal Netherlands Navy, crashes near Noordwijk, Netherlands.

24 August
Lockheed KC-130F, BuNo 149802, suffers a partial failure of its number one engine during takeoff and veers off the runway into the water off Kai Tak Airport; 59 of 71 killed. The aircraft was flying US Marines back to Vietnam after a rest and relaxation (R&R) leave in Hong Kong.

25 August
First Curtiss-Wright X-19A prototype, 62-12197, is destroyed in a crash at the FAA's National Aviation Facilities Experimental Center, Caldwell, New Jersey, (formerly NAS Atlantic City), when gearbox fails followed by loss of propellers at 0718:44 hrs EDT. Test pilot James V. Ryan and FAA copilot Hughes eject in North American LW-2B seats as the now-ballistic airframe rolled inverted at 390 feet, chutes fully deployed in 2 seconds at ~230 feet. Elapsed time between prop separation and ejection was 2.5 seconds. Airframe impacts in dried out tidewater area after completing 3/4 of a roll at 0719. Crew suffers minor injuries from ejection through canopy. The program is subsequently cancelled. This will be the last airframe design from two of the most famous company names in aviation. Second prototype, reported in some sources to have been scrapped, survives at Aberdeen Proving Grounds, Maryland, and is recovered in 2007 by the National Museum of the United States Air Force for preservation.

30 August
Third pre-production aircraft, MiG Ye-155R-5, is lost during its acceptance flight out of the Gorkii aircraft factory (Plant No.21), injuring test pilot L. I. Minenko.

17 September
C-130B Hercules TNI-AU T-1306, of the Indonesian Airforce, hit by friendly fire in Borneo. Pilot Major Soehardjo and co-pilot Captain Erwin SP Suroso escaped the burning plane after crash-landed on a grassy landing strip. No casualties. All paratroops on board jumped before the emergency landing.

22 September
Sikorsky HSS-1N Seabat, 141, of the Royal Netherlands Navy, crashes into the ocean off of Scotland.

13 October
Colonel Gerhard Barkhorn of the West German Air Force, assigned to Erprobungskommando (Operational Trials Command) with the Tripartite Evaluation Squadron, crash lands Hawker Siddeley Kestrel FGA.1, XS689, '9', at RAF West Raynham, UK, when he apparently cut thrust one meter above ground, wiping out the undercarriage. A Luftwaffe experten with 301 kills, he is said to have commented, "Drei hundert und zwei [302]!" as he was helped from the jet. Repaired, the airframe was sent to the United States as XV-6A 64-18623 and NASA 521 and is preserved at the Virginia Air and Space Center, Hampton, Virginia.

19 October
Second (of five) Ling-Temco-Vought XC-142As, 62-5922, suffers second accident when the number one main propeller pitch actuator suffers a hydraulic fluid blow-by problem just prior to touchdown at the Vought facility at NAS Dallas, Texas. A ground loop results with substantial damage to the landing gear and wing. In 1966 the damaged wing is replaced with an undamaged unit from XC-142A No. 3, 62–5923, out-of-service since its own landing accident on 3 January 1966. 62-5922 returns to flight status on 23 July 1966.

2 November
Argentine Air Force Douglas C-54G Skymaster TC-48 disappears during a flight from Howard Air Force Base, Panama to El Salvador International Airport with 68 on board (including 54 air force cadets). The crew had reported that the number three engine was on fire and that engine number four had failed and that they were attempting an emergency landing or possibly a ditching at sea. Aircraft believed to have crashed in the sea between Panama and Costa Rica, 30 km (19 mi) from the coast.

5 December
Douglas A-4E Skyhawk, BuNo 151022, of VA-56 on nuclear alert status, armed with one Mark 43 TN nuclear weapon, rolls off of elevator of aircraft carrier USS Ticonderoga (CVA-14), in the Pacific Ocean. The Skyhawk was being rolled from the number 2 hangar bay to the number 2 elevator when it was lost. Airframe, pilot Lt. D.M. Webster, and bomb are lost in 16,000 feet of water 80 miles from one of the Ryukyu Islands in Okinawa. Webster, from Warren, Ohio, was a 1964 graduate of the Ohio State University. No public mention was made of the incident at the time and it would not come to light until a 1981 Pentagon report revealed that a one-megaton bomb had been lost. Japan then asks for details of the incident.

12 December
While off Norfolk, a catapult launch off USS Independence ruptures a McDonnell F-4B Phantom II's detachable fuel tank, spilling and igniting 4,000 gallons of jet fuel. Fire destroys another Phantom and spreads into aviation stores compartment before being extinguished. 16 sailors are burned or injured.

28 December
CIA pilot Mele Vojvodich, Jr. takes Lockheed A-12, 60–6929, Article 126, for a functional check flight (FCF) after a period of deep maintenance, but seconds after take-off from Groom Dry Lake, Nevada, the aircraft yaws uncontrollably, pilot ejecting at 100 feet (30 m) after six seconds of flight, escaping serious injury. Investigation finds that the pitch stability augmentation system (SAS) had been connected to the yaw SAS actuators, and vice versa. SAS connectors are changed to make such wiring mistake impossible. Said Kelly Johnson in a history of the Oxcart program, "It was perfectly evident from movies taken of the takeoff, and from the pilot's description, that there were some miswired gyros in the aircraft. This turned out to be exactly what happened. In spite of color coding and every other normal precaution, the pitch and yaw gyro connections were interchanged in rigging."

== 1966 ==
3 January
Third (of five) Ling-Temco-Vought XC-142As, 62-5923, suffers major landing gear and fuselage damage during landing on 14th Cat II flight at Edwards Air Force Base, California, having logged only 14:12 hrs. Cat II flight time. Air Force decides to use wing from this airframe to repair XC-142A No. 2, 62–5922, which suffers major damage on 19 October 1965, other useful items are salvaged from airframe no. 3, and the cannibalized fuselage is scrapped in the summer of 1966.

8 January
A USAF Fairchild C-119C Flying Boxcar, 51-2611, c/n 10600, en route from Windsor Locks-Bradley International Airport, Connecticut to Binghamton Airport, New York, suffers an uncontained engine failure. The crew decides to bail out. The first crew member gets out at an altitude of ~2000 feet. The captain and co-pilot were not able to exit in time. The airplane descends and crashes into a lakefront house near Scranton, Pennsylvania, also killing a boy on the ground.

17 January
A Boeing B-52G Stratofortress, 58-0256, of the 68th Bomb Wing out of Seymour Johnson AFB, North Carolina, collides with a KC-135A-BN Stratotanker, 61-0273, c/n 18180, flying boom during aerial refueling near Palomares, Almería, breaking bomber's back. Seven crew members are killed in the crash, two eject safely, and two of the B-52's Mark 28 nuclear bombs rupture, scattering radioactive material over the countryside. One bomb lands intact near the town, and another is lost at sea. It is later recovered intact 5 miles (8 km) offshore in deep trench. Two of the recovered weapons are exhibited at the National Museum of Nuclear Science & History, Albuquerque, New Mexico.

17 January
Two crew of a Republic F-105F Thunderchief based at Eglin Air Force Base, Florida, escape injury when the engine of the fighter-bomber in which they are engaged in a photo-chase mission catches fire, forcing them to eject. The airframe impacts in East Bay, near Tyndall AFB, Florida at 1008 hrs. Pilot Capt. James D. Clendenen and photographer S/Sgt. J. G. Cain are recovered from the water by a Tyndall base helicopter.

17 January
A Lockheed T-33 Shooting Star on a night mission crashes and burns in a wooded area 11 miles NW of Eglin AFB, killing both crew. According to the base information officer, the wreckage was located in a densely wooded area which made the approach of rescue vehicles difficult. Killed while flying (KWF) were Capt. Robert D. Freeman, 30, of Lindsey, Oklahoma, and 2nd Lt. Roger A. Carr, 26, of Ames, Iowa. Both were residents of Fort Walton Beach, Florida and were assigned to the Air Proving Ground Center.

25 January
Lockheed SR-71A, 61-7952, Article 2003, crashes near Tucumcari, New Mexico during test flight out of Edwards Air Force Base, California. Pilot Bill Weaver survives, but RSO Jim Zwayer KWF.

28 February
NASA astronauts Elliot See and Charles Bassett, original Gemini 9 crew, are killed when their Northrop T-38A-50-NO Talon, 63-8181, N901NA, crashes into a building while attempting to land in fog at Lambert Field, St. Louis, Missouri.

6 March
The crash of a Grumman S-2 Tracker moments after take-off from Kirtland AFB, New Mexico, kills all four U.S. Navy crew on board. A military spokesman said that the twin-engined anti-submarine warfare plane crashed and burned "after climbing to some 100-feet. Wreckage was spread over a wide area about one mile south of the base." One crew member attempted to eject, and his seat and parachute were found a few yards from the wreckage. The other three crew were in the wreckage when rescue units arrived. Identity of the victims was being withheld pending notification of next of kin.

23 March
First prototype LTV YA-7A Corsair II, BuNo 152580, rolls inverted while landing at Naval Air Facility China Lake, California, and crashes on golf course ~3 miles SE of approach end of the primary runway. Vought test pilot John Omvig was doing touch and goes and on the last one the A-7 began to roll and he ejected just before it rolled 90 degrees, with extremely low parachute deployment. The cause was pilot error when the hydraulic system was switched off (flight test configuration) and loss of control resulted. He will later be killed in the XC-142A, 62-5921, crash on 10 May 1967 near Dallas, Texas.

5 April
A Hurlburt Field, Florida-based North American T-28 Trojan makes a forced landing on the Eglin AFB, Florida, reservation, but suffers little damage and the two crew are unhurt.

6 April
Two Hurlburt Field pilots are killed shortly before 1200 hrs. when their North American T-28 Trojan fails to pull out of a dive during a routine dive-bombing and gunnery-training mission on Range 77 at Eglin AFB, Florida, about eight miles from the field. The wreckage is located in such a remotely wooded area that it takes more than an hour before news of the accident can be released that it had taken place. KWF are pilot Capt. Dennis L. Anderson, 30, of Guernsey, Wyoming, from the 3646th Pilot Training Wing, and co-pilot Capt. Hubert L. Blake, 28, of Garland, Texas, from 3651st Pilot Training Squadron. Both were TDY to the 4410th Combat Crew Training Wing. Cause of the crash is investigated, and in the meantime, all Tactical Air Warfare Center T-28s are grounded as a precautionary measure.

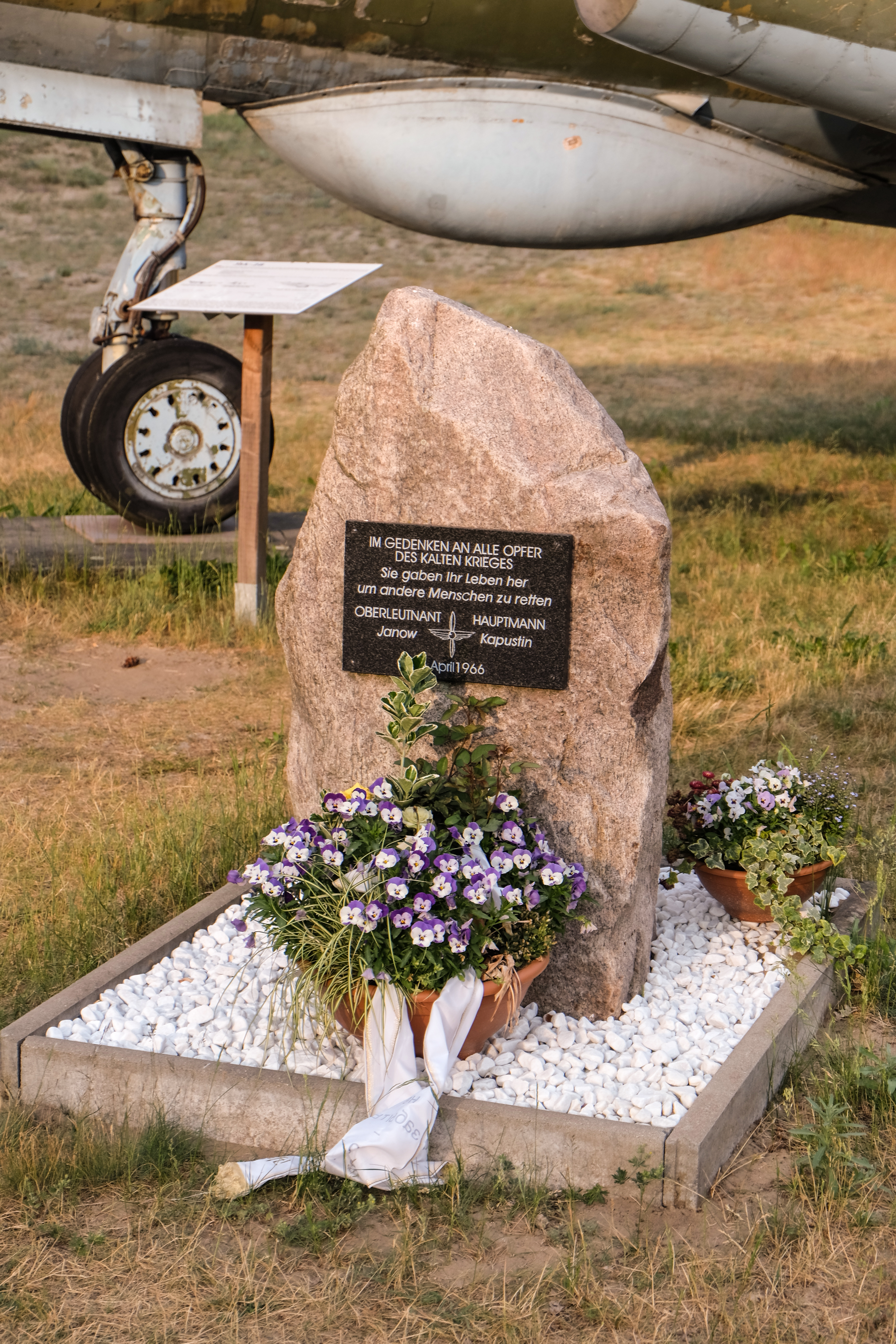
Monument to the feat of Yanov and Kapustin in the Finovfurt Aviation Museum

Yakovlev Yak-28 of Group of Soviet Forces in Germany's 24th Air Army had fallen into the Stössensee lake due to compressor stall of both engines. The pilots, Boris Kapustin and Yury Yanov, chose not to eject from the stricken aircraft, piloting it away from the center of Berlin. At first they tried to land on Berlin's cemetery but rejected after recognizing lots of people on that area; then they tried to land on Stössensee lake but were forced to lift the plane after recognizing a levee full or traffic. Then the plane crashed into the lake under a large angle. Both pilots were killed. A song "Ogromnoe nebo" was written in the memory of Soviet pilots.

13 April
Royal Iraqi Air Force de Havilland DH.104 Dove 1, RF392, crashes near Basra, Iraq, on flight from Baghdad during a Haboob, killing all seven on board, including President of Iraq Colonel Abd-al-Salam Mohammad Arif (8 February 1963 – 13 April 1966), and two ministers. Some sources report this accident as a helicopter crash.

6 May
USMC McDonnell RF-4B Phantom II, BuNo 153090, of VMCJ-3, MCAS El Toro, California, on out-and-back familiarization flight from MCAS Yuma, Arizona, is lost ~2 miles off of Del Mar, California in the Pacific when the pilot gets into an aerobatic maneuver stall. Both crew eject. Cause of the accident was pilot factor in that he failed to control the aircraft properly resulting in a spin. He then failed to execute properly the spin recovery technique. His instrument scan and awareness of what his airplane was doing were also seriously deficient. Wreckage discovered in 1994 by the UB88 dive group.

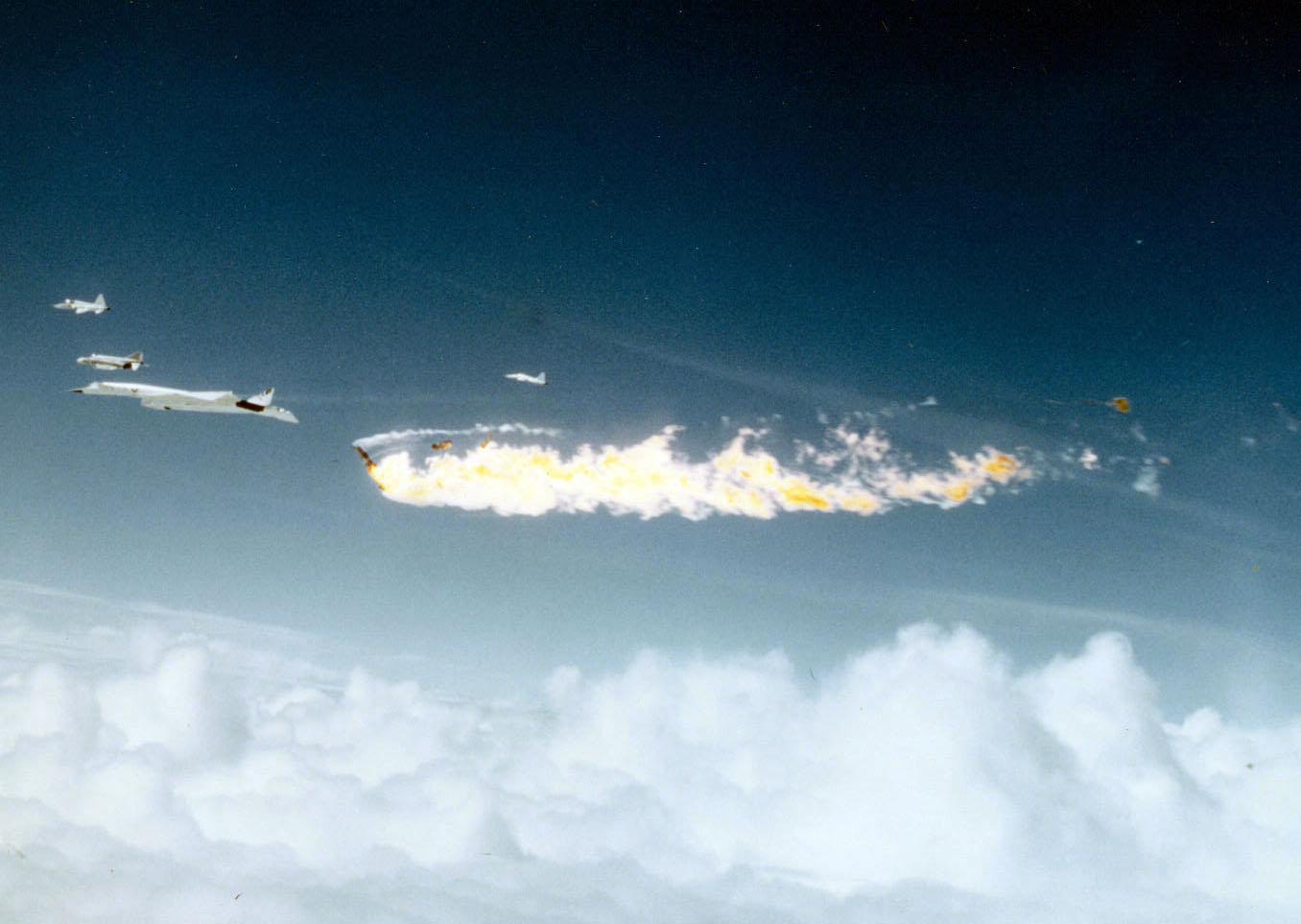
XB-70 62-0207 following the midair collision on 8 June 1966 with Joe Walker's F-104N tumbling in flames in foreground.

8 June
Second North American XB-70A Valkyrie prototype, 62-0207, crashes at Edwards Air Force Base, California, following a mid-air collision with a Lockheed F-104 Starfighter, NASA 813, previously 013, while the aircraft were in close formation for a photo shoot at the behest of General Electric. The pilot of the F-104N, Dr. Joseph A. Walker, late of the X-15 program, and Maj. Carl Cross, the copilot of the XB-70, are killed.

4 July
A U.S. Navy Lockheed P-3 Orion, flying from Floyd Bennett Field, New York, to Naval Air Station Glenview, Illinois, disappears from Chicago radar at 1444 hrs., and plunges into a rural wooded area near Battle Creek, Michigan, killing all four on board. The dead are identified as Lt. William E. Xiques, Staten Island, New York; Lt. John Patrick Fitzmaurice III, Waterbury, Connecticut; Aviation Machinist's Mate 2/c Charles J. Lurvey, Meriden, Connecticut; and Aviation Machinist's Mate 3/c Larry W. Battsen, Santa Clara, California. The impact digs a trench 12 to 15 feet deep and 50 to 75 feet long, and the explosion scatters small parts over three miles away which rain down for several minutes. The Orion was due to pick up eight officers and enlisted men at NAS Glenview at 1600 hrs. and fly them to Naval Air Station Moffett Field, California.

16 July
A C-123 aircraft crashed into the Arctic Ocean near Cape Lisburne. Alaska, with the loss of all aboard, including Capt. Anthony John Lanzetta, USAF, a 1960 graduate of the United States Naval Academy.

18 July
A fuel tank on a Boeing B-52D Stratofortress of the 509th Bombardment Wing (Heavy) out of Pease AFB, New Hampshire, detaches due to a mounting pylon failure and lands 4,000 feet up on Sugarloaf Mountain in Kingfield, Maine.

22 July
Walter "Taffy" Holden, an engineer in command of No. 33 Maintenance Unit RAF with limited experience flying small single-engine trainer aircraft, inadvertently engages the afterburner of a Mach 2.0 capable English Electric Lightning during ground testing. Unable to disengage the afterburner, Holden runs down the runway narrowly missing a crossing fuel truck and a de Havilland Comet taking off, before taking off himself. Flying without a helmet or canopy, the ejection seat and landing gear disabled, Holden aborts a couple of attempted landings. He lands on his third approach, striking the runway with the aircraft's tail as he adopts in his flare the attitude of a taildragger aircraft. The aircraft was subsequently returned to service, and was later acquired by the Imperial War Museum Duxford.

30 July
Lockheed A-12, 60–6941, Article 135, modified as an M-21, D-21 drone carrier for Project Tagboard, is lost during the fourth test over the Pacific Ocean off the coast of California when the D-21 drone, 504, suffers asymmetrical unstart as it passes through bow wake of the mothership during launch at Mach 3.25, strikes the Blackbird, destroying right rudder, engine nacelle and most of the outer wing during separation. Lockheed employees, pilot Bill Park and launch control officer Ray Torick, both successfully eject, but Torick tragically drowns in a feet-wet landing. Skunk Works head Clarence "Kelly" Johnson subsequently scrubs M-21 launch program, saying "I will not risk any more test pilots or Blackbirds. I don't have either to spare." D-21s are modified to D-21B standard for air launch from underwing pylons of a pair of mission-adapted Boeing B-52H Stratofortress bombers.

8 August
First prototype of U.S. Navy Bell X-22, 1520, P-1, suffers a forced landing four miles from Niagara Falls Airport, New York, during its 15th flight, with only 3.2 hours of flight time, due to failure of a propeller control, described by the test pilot, Stanley Kakol, as the only non-redundant component in the power chain. Two crew survive. Airframe stripped of components to make second prototype flight capable and fuselage used as a simulator for some time before being scrapped.

22 August
Second (of five) Ling-Temco-Vought XC-142As, 62-5922, returned to flight status on 23 July 1966 after wing replacement, is delivered to the U.S. Air Force at Edwards Air Force Base, California for Cat II testing, but on this date during one the airframe's first flights at that base, a chip detector warning light for the number three propeller illuminates, so the engine is shut down and the prop feathered. Heavy braking during extended roll-out as a result of landing with the collective lever disengaged causes brake fires in the main gear pods. Damage takes until 2 September to repair.

2 September
A U.S. Navy Grumman F-11A Tiger, BuNo 141764 , of the Blue Angels aerobatic team, Blue Angel 5, crashes on the shore of Lake Ontario during the International Air Exhibition at Toronto, Ontario, Canada. The pilot, Lieutenant Commander Richard "Dick" Oliver, 31 years old, of Fort Mill, South Carolina, is killed. Coming out of a knife edge pass, followed by a roll, 5 contacts the lake surface at ~500 mph and literally skis across the surface, striking a six-foot high sheet steel piling retaining wall on the edge of Toronto Island Airport and disintegrating. Wreckage (turbine) is thrown as far as 3,483.6 feet from point of initial impact.

7 September
Second (of five) Ling-Temco-Vought XC-142As, 62-5922, suffers failure of idler gear in number three engine gearbox during a pre-flight run-up at Edwards Air Force Base, California. Entire gearbox has to be replaced. Investigation reveals problem with inadequately supported aluminum pin that serves as an axle for this gear, making misalignment and eventual failure inevitable, so a fix is designed and the starboard gearboxes of all XC-142s are modified.

5 October
Ryan XV-5A Vertifan, 62-4506, crashes at Edwards Air Force Base, California, killing Air Force test pilot Maj. David Tittle. During hover, the aircraft began uncontrolled roll to left, pilot ejected at 50 feet (15.24 m), but chute failed to deploy.

8 October
Lockheed U-2C, 56-6690, of the 349th Strategic Reconnaissance Squadron, 100th Strategic Reconnaissance Wing, develops technical problems while on high-altitude reconnaissance flight over North Vietnam, attempts to recover to base but crashes near Bien Hoa, South Vietnam. Pilot Maj. Leo J. Stewart ejects and survives. This is the only U.S. Air Force U-2 loss in theatre during the War in Southeast Asia.

12 October
Two North American F-100 Super Sabres of the USAF Thunderbirds demonstration team collide during practice for a show at Sheppard AFB, Texas, at Indian Springs Air Force Auxiliary Field, Nevada, killing two of the three pilots. The jets were performing opposing half Cuban Eights when witnesses said that the two jets scraped each other at the top of a loop. The pilot of the F-100F, Capt. Robert H. Morgan, 32, of Pendleton, South Carolina, ejected but his chute did not have time to deploy and he died when he struck the ground still strapped to his seat, while team member, Maj. Frank E. Liethen, Jr., 36, Appleton, Wisconsin, riding in the second seat, died when the Super Sabre struck the desert floor. The fighter impact left a crater almost twelve feet deep. "Liethen, executive officer of the Thunderbirds, was riding with Morgan on an orientation flight. He had been with the group since last December, but ordinarily did not take part in formation flying. However, he had been scheduled to take over soon as commander and would have flown at the head of the group's diamond formation." Capt. Robert D. Beckel, 29, of Walla Walla, Washington, was able to land his F-100D at Nellis AFB, Nevada. "The Air Force said it was a 'tribute to his flying skill' that Beckel was able to land his plane, damaged in a wing. The red, white and blue jets cost a reported $650,000." Both Liethan and Morgan leave a widow and four children. "A Thunderbird spokesman said a show Saturday in Wichita Falls, Tex., would go on despite the crash – but maybe with five planes instead of six because there was no one trained to replace Morgan."

12 October
Lockheed C-130E-LM Hercules, 63-7886, c/n 3957, of the 516th Troop Carrier Wing, Dyess AFB, Texas, flies into ground at night circa 30 kilometers north-northwest of Aspermont, Texas. It impacts in a brushy pasture on the 6666 Ranch, 75 miles NW of Abilene near U.S. 83. Only one of the crew of six survives, a loadmaster, who is pulled from the wreckage by a passing truck driver, Carroll Brezee. He was in critical condition. The fuselage and tail section lay near the center of a burned area about 50 X 200 yards, with parts scattered along a half mile stretch. Sheriff E. W. Hollar, of Guthrie, nine miles N of the crash site, said that persons first reaching the scene found two bodies. A ground party from Dyess AFB found the other three in a search through heavy mesquite brush. Authorities said that these were the first fatalities in the 516th Troop Carrier Wing since it was formed at Dyess in December 1958.

17 October
Lockheed U-2D, 56-6951, Article 391, first airframe of the USAF supplementary production, and assigned to the 4080th Strategic Reconnaissance Wing, Laughlin AFB, Texas, crashes this date at Davis-Monthan AFB, Arizona, in a non-fatal accident. Pilot was Maj. Leslie White, who stalled on approach on his first flight. "The pilot survived, but the airplane was washed out," noted Kelly Johnson.

26 October
A fire in a flare locker in Hangar Bay One of the USS Oriskany (CVA-34) beginning at 0728 hrs. spreads through the hangar deck and to the flight deck. Before the fires are extinguished two Kaman SH-2 Seasprite helicopters are lost, Douglas A-4E Skyhawk, BuNo 151075, is destroyed, and three others are damaged, as are Hangar Bays One and Two, the forward officer quarters and catapults, and 44 crew are killed.

29 October
A burning North American F-86H Sabre fighter of the 174th Tactical Fighter Group, New York Air National Guard, based at Syracuse, New York, crashes into two house trailers in a trailer park next to Route 28, Poland, New York, NE of Utica, critically burning Mrs. Alberta Eaton, a 19-year-old pregnant woman, in one dwelling, who is blown 15 feet from the structure by the impact blast. She is transported to hospital with first and second-degree burns, state police reported. The second trailer was unoccupied at the time of the crash. The Sabre pilot, Capt. William R. Kershlis, Jr., 34, of Ithaca, who ejected safely, landing NE of Poland, telephoned his base at Syracuse to report that he seemed to be alright.

11 November
A U.S. Air Force Lockheed EC-121H-LO Warning Star of the 551st AEWCW, out of Otis AFB, Massachusetts, crashes in the North Atlantic ~125 miles E of Nantucket, Massachusetts by unexplained circumstances, approximately the same general area as the one lost 11 July 1965. All 19 crew members are KWF, bodies never recovered.

11 November
Republic F-84F Thunderstreak of the 104th Tactical Fighter Group, Massachusetts Air National Guard out of Barnes Municipal Airport, Westfield, Massachusetts, goes into flat spin during simulated combat over Porter, Maine and crashes on Colcord Pond Road in Freedom, New Hampshire. Capt. Edward S. Mansfield has minor injuries; plane is destroyed.

28 November
Second prototype Dassault Mirage IIIV, an experimental VTOL fighter design, first flown 22 June 1966, crashes this date. Project, running several years behind schedule, is canceled and plans to build additional prototypes dropped.

7 December
US Army Grumman OV-1B Mohawk, 62-5894, of the 122nd Aviation Company, on photo mission out of Fleigerhorst AAF, Hanau, Germany, is written off after engine failure then fire. Pilot Capt. Bill Ebert and crewman SP4 Ken Bakos eject. Aircraft crashes in a small forest outside the town of Volkartshain.

== 1967 ==
5 January
Lockheed A-12, 60–6928, Article 125, lost during training/test flight. CIA pilot Walter Ray successfully ejects but is killed upon impact with terrain due to failed seat-separation sequence. The Air Force-issue seatbelt failed to release properly. The aircraft had run out of fuel for a variety of reasons.

5 January
Martin MGM-13 Mace, launched from Site A-15, Santa Rosa Island, Hurlburt Field, Florida, by the 4751st Air Defense Missile Squadron at ~1021 hrs., fails to circle over Gulf of Mexico for test mission with two Eglin AFB McDonnell F-4 Phantom IIs, but heads south for Cuba. Third F-4 overtakes it, fires two test AAMs with limited success, then damages unarmed drone with cannon fire. Mace overflies western tip of Cuba before crashing in Caribbean 100 miles south of the island. International incident narrowly avoided. To forestall the possibility, the United States State Department asks the Swiss Ambassador in Havana to explain the circumstances of the wayward drone to the Cuban government. The Mace had been equipped with an "improved guidance system known as 'ASTRAN' which is considered unjammable." (This was apparently a typo for ATRAN – Automatic Terrain Recognition And Navigation terrain-matching radar navigation.)

7 January
U.S. Navy Lockheed P-2 Neptune on training mission with nine Naval Reservists on board, on out-and-back flight from the Naval Air Facility, Andrews AFB, Maryland, crashes in light rainstorm near Upper Marlboro, Maryland, killing all crew. Neptune disappeared from radar at 1107 hrs., impacting in wooded area, digging crater 10 feet deep, 30 feet wide, 100 feet long. Airframe completely disintegrates, said Lt. Cmdr. Don Maunder.

9 January
While operating off of the Philippines, a Sikorsky SH-3A Sea King helicopter crashes on the flight deck of USS Bennington during take-off. Crew members receive only minor injuries.

10 January
Lockheed SR-71A, 61-7950, Item 2001, lost during anti-skid brake system evaluation at Edwards Air Force Base, California. Pilot Art Peterson survives.

11 January
During night operations off of the Philippines, a Sikorsky SH-3A Sea King, assigned to USS Bennington, strikes the water and sinks at sea. The following casualties were received aboard: LT (jg) William L. Finkenhagen, USNR, and AX2 Roberto B. Reed, USN, who were transferred to Subic Bay for further care; LT (jg) Charles B. Stella, USNR, and RD1 William T. Smith, USN, who were treated and retained aboard. AX3 Clayton Kemp, USN, and AX3 Wayne C. Reinecke, USN, were declared dead after an extensive air-sea search following the accident.

19 January
First General Dynamics F-111 accident occurs when pre-production F-111A, 63-9774, c/n A1-09, lands short of the runway at Edwards Air Force Base, California, due an improper wing sweep setting. The crew of two is uninjured, but when the pilot, Maj. Herbert F. Brightwell, goes around to unfasten the WSO, Col. Donovan I. McCance, he stands in a pool of spilled JP-4 fuel which subsequently ignites, killing him.

27 January
Apollo 1 launchpad fire kills three U.S. astronauts. Apollo 1 is the official name that was later given to the never-flown Apollo/Saturn 204 (AS-204) mission. Its command module, CM-012, was destroyed by fire during a test and training exercise at Pad 34 (Launch Complex 34, Cape Canaveral, then known as Cape Kennedy) atop a Saturn IB rocket. The crew aboard were the astronauts selected for the first manned Apollo program mission: Command Pilot Virgil I. "Gus" Grissom, Senior Pilot Ed White and Pilot Roger B. Chaffee. Although the ignition source of the fire was never conclusively identified, the deaths were attributed to a wide range of lethal design hazards in the early Apollo command module. Among these were the use of a high-pressure 100 percent-oxygen atmosphere for the test, wiring and plumbing flaws, inflammable materials in the cockpit (such as Velcro), an inward-opening hatch that would not open in this kind of an emergency and the flight suits worn by the astronauts.

1 February
Rookie member of the Blue Angels U.S. Navy flight demonstration team, Lt. Frank Gallagher, of Flushing, New York, is killed while flying (KWF) when his Grumman F-11A Tiger crashes during a practice flight ~16 miles NW of NAS El Centro, California. Fighter impacts in rugged desert terrain on a Navy test range. Assigned to the team only six weeks before, he is the fourth Blue Angels team member to die in an accident. Gallagher flew as the solo in the four-man formation and as number 6 in the full formation.

18 February
Second crash of a Blue Angels demonstration team jet in three weeks kills the newest team member, U.S. Marine Corps Capt. Ronald F. Thomsen, 28, when his Grumman F-11A Tiger impacts just 250 yards from the site of the accident on 1 February 1967. The Navy opened a crash investigation on 19 February into the crash ~16 miles NW of NAS El Centro, California, which killed the pilot only four days after he joined the demonstration team.

21 February
A U.S. Navy Douglas A-4 Skyhawk from the USS Franklin D. Roosevelt, newly returned from a tour off Vietnam, crashes into the home of Mr. and Mrs. Truxton Basnight near Virginia Beach, Virginia after the pilot ejects. The delta-winged attack jet cut a swath through trees and impacted the frame house, cartwheeled over the structure, throwing burning fuel into the home. Five civilians are injured, two critically.

5 March
U.S. Coast Guard Grumman HU-16 Albatross, 1240, out of St. Petersburg, Florida, deploys to drop a dewatering pump to a sinking 40-foot yacht, Flying Fish, off of Carrabelle, Florida. Shortly after making a low pass after the sinking vessel to drop the pump, the flying boat crashes a short distance away, with loss of all six crew. Submerged wreck not identified until 2006.

23 March
Worst ground aviation accident of Vietnam War occurs at Da Nang Air Base, South Vietnam when traffic controller clears USMC Grumman A-6A Intruder, BuNo 152608, of VMA (AW)-242, MAG-11, for takeoff but also clears U.S. Air Force Lockheed C-141A-LM Starlifter, 65-9407, of the 62nd Military Airlift Wing, McChord AFB, Washington, to cross runway. A-6 crew sees Starlifter at last moment, veers off runway to try to avoid it, but port wing slices through C-141's nose, which immediately catches fire, load of 72 acetylene gas cylinders ignite and causes tremendous explosion, only loadmaster escaping through rear hatch. Intruder overturns, skids on down runway on back, but both crew, Capt. Frederick Cone and Capt. Doug Wilson, survive, crawl out of smashed canopy after jet stops. Some of ordnance load of 16 X 500 lb. bombs and six rocket packs go off in ensuing fire. Military Airlift Command crew killed are Capt. Harold Leland Hale, Capt. Leroy Edward Leonard, Capt. Max Paul Starkel, S/Sgt. Alanson Garland Bynum, and S/Sgt. Alfred Funck. This is the first of two C-141s lost during the conflict, and one of only three strategic airlifters written off during the Vietnam War.

27 March
A Douglas A-4 Skyhawk of VA-72 out of NAS Cecil Field, Florida, crashes into a wooded area W of Lake City, Florida after pilot Lt. Cmdr. Robert W. McKay, 34, ejects from the crippled jet. "He suffered no apparent injuries", a Navy spokesman said. "He was picked up by the Highway Patrol and will be returned to Cecil Field on a Navy helicopter."

5 April
A U.S. Navy Douglas A-3B Skywarrior, BuNo 138917, c/n 10778, of VAH-123, departs NAS Miramar, California, for NAS Whidbey Island, Washington, on an instrument check flight, but crashes into a mountain in northeastern California in the vicinity of Eagle Peak in the Warner Mountains, ~15 miles SE of Alturas, California, killing all four aboard. The aircraft was in clouds at FL 180 when it struck terrain covered in four to six feet of snow, and disintegrated at the 7,000 foot level. Hand-off from Oakland Center was not received by Seattle Center. KWF were Lt. Cdr. Donald E. King, 36, instructor pilot; Lt. Cdr. Richard E. Parks, pilot; AMM3 Carl V. Miller, 23, crewman-navigator; and Lt. Cdr. James M. Reader, passenger.

12 April
C-141A, 66-0127 crashed after taking off from Cam Ranh Bay AB, Vietnam. Five crew were killed and two were rescued.

13 April
Lockheed SR-71A, 61-7966, Article 2017, crashed near Las Vegas, New Mexico, after a night refuelling devolved into a subsonic high-speed stall. Pilot Boone and RSO Sheffield eject safely.

21 April
Fourth prototype Grumman F-111B, BuNo 151973, c/n A2-04, suffers flame-out of both engines at 200 feet after take-off, killing the project pilot Ralph Donnell and co-pilot Charles Wangeman.

24 April
Cosmonaut Vladimir Komarov dies during reentry of Soyuz 1 – parachute lines tangled during re-entry. Crashed to ground. First person to die while on a space mission.

25 April
A U.S. Air Force Lockheed EC-121H-LO Warning Star, 53-549, of the 551st AEWCW, out of Otis AFB, Massachusetts, ditches in the North Atlantic ~one mile off of Nantucket, Massachusetts, just after having taken off from that base. One survivor, 15 crew KWF. Five bodies were not recovered. Col. James P. Lyle, the Commander of the 551st AEW&C Wing to which all the aircraft and crew members were assigned, was the pilot. Colonel Lyle had been assigned to take over that command nine months earlier. It was he who presented each of the next of kin of 11 November 1966 crash victims with the United States Flag during that memorial service.

10 May
First (of five) LTV XC-142As, 62-5921, crashes on 149th flight during simulated downed-pilot recovery mission test. Rapid descent from 8,000 feet to avoid ground-fire ends badly when aircraft pitches over violently at low altitude, impacting in heavily wooded, marshy area at Mountain Creek Lake, near Dallas, Texas, killing three crew. Airframe destroyed by impact and post-crash fire. KWF are contract pilot Stuart Madison, co-pilot Charles Jester, and hoist operator John Omvig. Investigation finds cause to be failure of tail propeller control system, causing overspeed condition which generated unexpected and uncontrollable nose-down pitch.

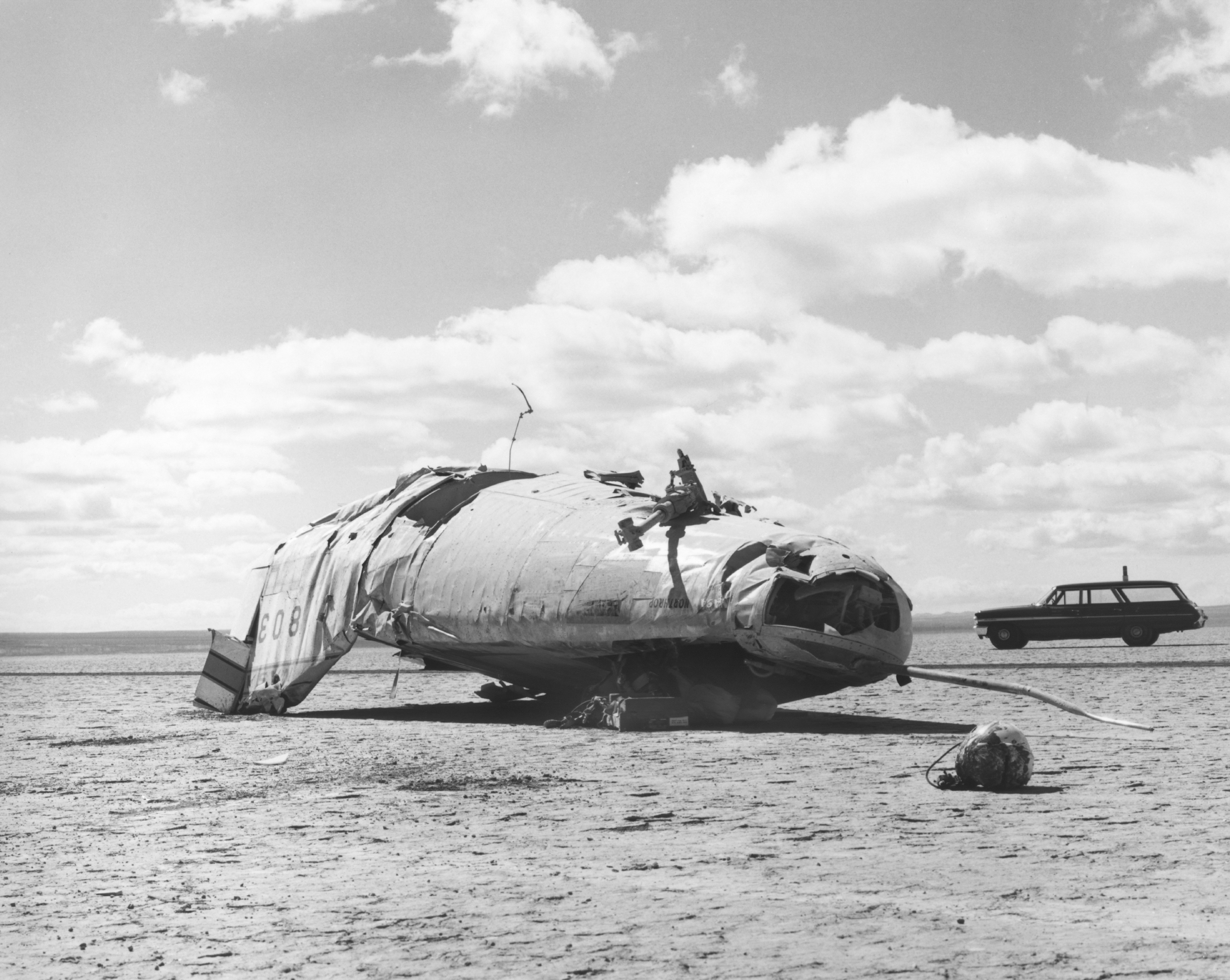
The crash site of the M2-F2

10 May
Northrop M2-F2, NASA 803, during the 16th glide flight, crashes on landing at Edwards Air Force Base, California, due to a pilot-induced oscillation coupled with misjudged height and drift. Airframe rolls over six times, footage used for television program The Six Million Dollar Man. Pilot Bruce Peterson survives.

28 May
T-38A Talon crashed at Moody AFB, Valdosta, GA killing student pilot 1st Lt. Harold C. Barnes and instructor Captain Les Rippey. The plane flipped on landing. Instructor killed instantly, student survived until ejector dashed him into tarmac incurring severe head injuries. Lt. Barnes survived until that evening, when he succumbed to injuries at Shands Hospital in Gainesville, Florida. Crash was determined to be caused by cross wind and inexperienced pilot.

8 July
Boeing B-52D Stratofortress, 56-0601, of the 22d Bomb Wing, March AFB, California, operating in Southeast Asia with the 4133d Bomb Wing (Provisional), (call signs Brown 02 as part of a three-aircraft cell, and Corny 26 alone) overruns the runway on landing at Da Nang Air Base, Vietnam, due to not having full braking power (no flaps) as well as touching down at the mid-point of the 10,000 foot runway, and runs into a minefield. Mines go off, killing five of her six crew, only the tailgunner escaping when the tail section breaks away from the rest of the airframe. The crew was from the 736th Bomb Squadron, 454th Bomb Wing, Columbus AFB, Mississippi. The aircraft had suffered battle damage over Vinh, North Vietnam, losing all hydraulics and an electrical malfunction that led to the flameout of two engines, the pilot diverting to Da Nang for an emergency landing. This was the 43d B-52 to be lost.

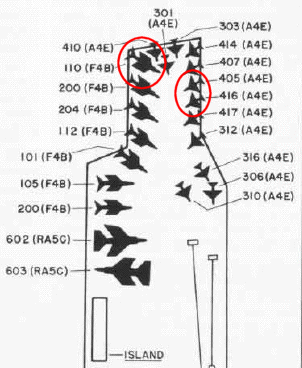
A drawing of the stern of Forrestal showing the spotting of aircraft at the time. Likely source of the Zuni was F-4 No. 110. White's and McCain's aircraft are in the right hand circle.

29 July
A deckfire on the USS Forrestal caused by an unintentional firing of a Zuni rocket by an electrical short-circuit from the underwing rack of a McDonnell Douglas F-4 Phantom II at 1051 hrs. holes the fuel tank of a McDonnell Douglas A-4 Skyhawk. Spilled fuel ignites and ordnance on the ready jets is set off by the blaze. Twenty-six aircraft are destroyed or jettisoned, 31 others are damaged, 132 crewmen die, 62 are injured and two are missing. The last major fire is extinguished at 4 a.m. on 30 July. See: 1967 USS Forrestal fire. Among lost airframes are Douglas A-4E Skyhawk, BuNos 149996, 150064, 150068, 150084, 150115, 150118, 150129, 152018, 152024, 152036, 152040; McDonnell Douglas F-4B Phantom II, 153046, 153054, 153060, 153061, 153066, 150069, 150912; and North American RA-5C Vigilantes of RVAH-11, 148932, 149284, and 149305.

2 August
A US Navy LTV A-7 Corsair II BuNo 152652 on a service test flight crashed at the south end of Lake Stanley Draper, OK. The aircraft was home stationed at NATC Patuxent River, MD and was flown by Captain Alec Gillespie who ejected. The aircraft had a total of 427 flight hours.

C-7 Caribou 62-4161 plunges to earth after being struck by US Army artillery, 3 August 1967. Photo by Hiromichi Mine.

3 August
A U.S. Air Force de Havilland Canada C-7B Caribou, 62-4161, c/n 99, 'KE' tailcode, of the 459th TAS, 483d TAW, plunges to earth minus its tail from low altitude after being hit by US 155 mm artillery "friendly fire" on approach to Đức Phổ Special Forces camp, Vietnam. Three crew killed, pilot Capt. Alan Eugene Hendrickson, co-pilot John Dudley Wiley, and loadmaster TSgt. Zane Aubry Carter. Dramatic photo of plunging aircraft taken by Japanese combat photographer Hiromichi Mine, who was himself killed in the line of duty 5 March 1968 from injuries suffered from a landmine.

21 September
Hawker Siddeley Kestrel, XS693, fitted with 19,000-lb thrust Bristol-Siddeley Pegasus 6 engine, crashes during trials at Filton, Sqn. Ldr. H. Rigg escaping safely.

27 September
A Lockheed SP-2H Neptune, BuNo 147946, of VP-30, collides with a US Navy Vought RF-8G Crusader, BuNo 146864, assigned to VFP-62, Detachment 38, NAS Cecil Field, Jacksonville, Florida, during a heavy rainstorm, near Jacksonville Beach, Florida, crashing on the swampy east bank of the Intracoastal Waterway. The Crusader, which was operating off of the USS Shangri-La, also impacts near Jacksonville Beach. The Neptune was carrying two officers and three enlisted men. The pilot was the only occupant of the jet. All six KWF.

5 October
NASA astronaut Clifton Williams, U.S. Marine Corps, suffers control failure in Northrop T-38A-65-NO Talon, 66-8354, N922NA, he was flying while en route from Cape Canaveral, Florida, to Mobile, Alabama, to see his father who was dying of cancer. Jet went into an uncontrollable aileron roll, Williams ejected but he was traveling too fast and was at too low an altitude, comes down near Tallahassee, Florida. Williams served on the backup crew for Gemini X and had been assigned to the back-up crew for what would be the Apollo 9 mission. This crew placement would have most likely led to an assignment as Lunar Module pilot for Apollo 12. The Apollo 12 mission patch has four stars on it – one each for the three astronauts who flew the mission, and one for Williams.

9 October
Second (of five) Ling-Temco-Vought XC-142As, 62-5922, suffers major landing gear and fuselage damage during STOL landing at Edwards Air Force Base, California, following a 28-minute functional check flight after incorporation of modified control system components. Crew uninjured. This was the 488th test flight of the XC-142 program, and it turns out to be the last one before the program is cancelled. Airframe not repaired.

21 October
During a Laughlin AFB, Texas, airshow, USAF Thunderbirds No. 6, a North American F-100D-20-NA Super Sabre, 55-3520, piloted by Capt. Merrill A. "Tony" McPeak, crashes, but he succeeds in ejecting as the plane broke up. As McPeak pulls up to begin a series of vertical rolls, the wing center box fails at ~6.5 Gs, and the engine catches fire as the center fuel tank ruptures, dumping fuel into the engine bay. Pilot ejects and lands near to the crowd. This crash limited flying on all USAF Super Sabres to 4G. This was the first Thunderbird crash during a performance.

14 November
A USMC Bell UH-1E Iroquois, BuNo. 153757, of VMO-3, callsign Scarface 1-0, departs Phú Bài, South Vietnam, at 1040 hrs. with three crew, pilot Capt. Milton George Kelsey, co-pilot 1st Lt. Thomas Anthony Carter, and crew chief Cpl. Ronald Joseph Phelps. At 1145 they pick up Major General Bruno Arthur Hochmuth, CG 3rd MARDIV, his aide Maj. Robert Andrew Crabtree and Liaison Maj. Nguyễn Ngọc Chương to visit ARVN Brig. Gen. Ngô Quang Trưởng in Huế, departing the hospital pad at Huế Citadel at 1145. En route to Đông Hà, the helicopter is chased by an HMM-364 UH-34 Choctaw piloted by Capt. J. A. Chancey. At 1150, the UH-1 is flying NW over Highway 1 at ~1500 feet. At YD672266, Capt. Chancey sees the aircraft's nose yaw to the right twice and at the same instant the aft/engine section explodes in an orange fireball. The fuselage separates from the rotor and the aircraft falls in pieces. The fuselage lands inverted in a flooded rice paddy; the tail cone a short distance away. All on board are apparently killed on impact. Hochmuth was the only Marine Corps officer of General rank to die in Vietnam. Although many theories were postulated for the crash, from enemy gunfire, to ARVN gunfire, to U.S. "friendly fire", to sabotage, the most likely reason was the failure of the tail rotor gearbox and the official findings on the incident, submitted by Brig. Gen. Robert Keller in November, 1967, states "there is no evidence to indicate this mishap was caused either by hostile action or inadvertent friendly fire."

14 November
Two McDonnell F-101B Voodoos of the 60th Fighter-Interceptor Squadron, out of Otis AFB, Massachusetts, collide over Maine during a cross-country formation flight. Aircraft 57-376 is destroyed crashing on Mount Abraham after the two-man crew ejects with minor injuries. The uninjured crew of moderately damaged aircraft 57-378 makes an emergency landing at Dow AFB, Maine.

15 November
On the 191st flight of the North American X-15 program out of Edwards Air Force Base, California, the third of three, 56-6672, suffers problems during reentry from 266,000 foot altitude, 3,750 mph mission. Airframe has massive structural failure, killing pilot Michael J. Adams, the only fatality in X-15s.

8 December
The first black American astronaut, Maj. Robert Henry Lawrence, Jr., is killed in the crash of a Lockheed F-104D Starfighter, 57-1327, of the 6515th Organizational Maintenance Squadron, while practicing zoom landings with Maj. Harvey Royer at Edwards Air Force Base, California. Lawrence was flying backseat on the mission as the instructor pilot for a flight test trainee learning the steep-descent glide technique intended for the cancelled Boeing X-20 Dyna-Soar program. The pilot of the aircraft successfully ejected and survived the accident, but with major injuries. The F-104 they were flying came in too low and hit the runway. Royer ejected, but Lawrence was killed. He left behind a wife and one son.

== 1968 ==
2 January
Col. Henry Brown and Lt. Col. Joe B. Jordan became the first U.S. Air Force pilots to use a General Dynamics F-111A's emergency escape module when their aircraft, 65-5701, c/n A1-19, of the Air Force Test Center, crashed near Edwards Air Force Base, California, due to a weapons bay fire.

11 January
Lockheed SR-71B, 61-7957, Article 2008, one of only two dual-control pilot trainers, was lost on approach to Beale Air Force Base, California, due to fuel cavitation induced engine failure. Instructor pilot Lt. Col. Robert G. Souers and student Capt. David E. Fruehauf eject safely.

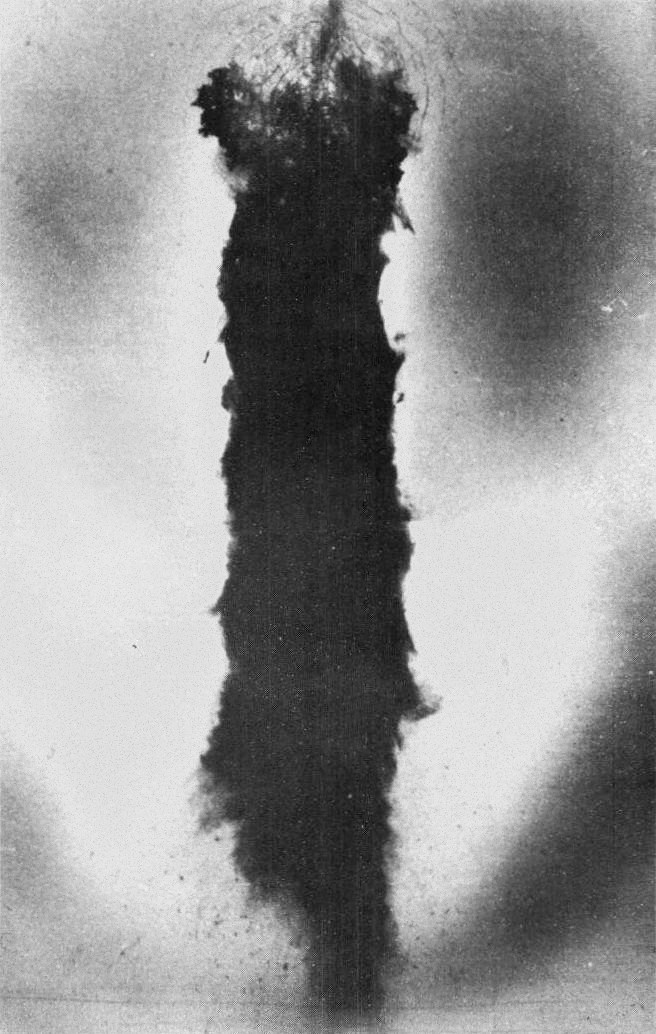
Aerial photograph of blackened ice at the accident site near Thule, with the point of impact at the top

21 January
A Boeing B-52G Stratofortress, 58-0188, of the 528th Bomb Squadron, 380th Bomb Wing, from Plattsburgh Air Force Base, New York, carrying four hydrogen bombs, crashes on the ice seven miles from Thule Air Base, Greenland at 1639 h. AST, one crew member killed; all four B-28 weapons are consumed in post-crash fire; however, one bomb was unaccounted for after debris is audited; extensive contamination of site and several relief workers exposed to radiation. This accident caused the Department of Defense to suspend Operation Chrome Dome, the nuclear airborne alert program of SAC.

7 February
Indian Air Force Antonov An-12 BL534 crashes in Himachal Pradesh, killing all 98 people on board. The wreckage was discovered on the Dhaka Glacier in 2003. Expeditions between 2003 and 2009 recover seven more bodies and a ninth body in 2018. Several pieces of the wreckage are recovered in 2019.

11 February
A U.S. Navy Lockheed T-1A SeaStar, of Reserve Attack Squadron 773, with two aboard, departs NAS Alameda's north-south runway on a flight training exercise to return to NAS Los Alamitos, near Long Beach, and, three miles north, strikes the cantilever section of the San Francisco–Oakland Bay Bridge between Oakland and Yerba Buena Island, in heavy fog. Striking the steelwork fifteen feet above the five-lane upper deck, the trainer explodes with most of the wreckage going into San Francisco Bay, although a wing partially blocks the roadway and closes the one-way upper deck for 2 hours, 9 minutes after the late-morning crash. Reservists Lt. Bruce Turnbull, 34, divorced, father of two, Teresa, 8, and Scott, 5, of Arcadia, California, and Lt. Anthony Miller, 33, married, no children, go missing, with Navy divers and Coast Guard vessels engaged in a search for bodies. "E. R. Foley, chief engineer of the span, said the plane hit one of the five main truss stands for the structure. He said the bent and blackened section, weighing several tons, would be replaced." This was the second time a plane hit the bridge. On 12 September 1943, a Navy Wildcat struck a suspension cable. The pilot's body was not recovered.

18 February
Douglas C-47D, 43-48471, of the U.S. Air Force, crashes on takeoff from Tan Son Nhut Air Base, Vietnam. All three people on board survive.

7 March
An Aermacchi MB-326 of the Royal Australian Air Force crashed near Stradbroke, Victoria. The pilot ejected from the aircraft before it crashed, but received a broken leg.
9 March
French General Charles Ailleret, chief of France's general staff, is killed in crash of L'Armée de L'Air Douglas DC-6B, 43748, F-RAFB, c/n 43748/314, shortly after takeoff from Saint-Denis, Réunion, in the Indian Ocean. En route to Paris, the transport failed to turn toward the ocean after lift off and struck a hill at 2317 h.

27 March
While on a routine training flight out of Chkalovsky Air Base, Kosmonaut Yuri Gagarin and flight instructor Vladimir Seryogin (Seregin) die in a Mikoyan-Gurevich MiG-15UTI, c/n 612739, callsign 625, crash near the town of Kirzhach. Gagarin and Seryogin were buried in the walls of the Kremlin on Red Square. It is not certain what caused the crash, but a 1986 inquest suggests that the turbulence from a Su-11 "Fishpot-C" interceptor using its afterburners may have caused Gagarin's plane to go out of control. Russian documents declassified in March 2003 showed that the KGB had conducted their own investigation of the accident, in addition to one government and two military investigations. The KGB's report dismissed various conspiracy theories, instead indicating that the actions of air base personnel contributed to the crash. The report states that an air traffic controller provided Gagarin with outdated weather information, and that when Gagarin flew, conditions had deteriorated significantly. Ground crew also left external fuel tanks attached to the aircraft. His planned flight activities needed clear weather and no outboard tanks. The investigation concluded that Gagarin's aircraft entered a spin, either due to a bird strike or because of a sudden move to avoid another aircraft. Because of the out-of-date weather report, the crew believed their altitude to be higher than it actually was, and could not properly react to bring the MiG-15 out of its spin.

11 April
Douglas A-4F Skyhawk, BuNo 154995, of VA-93, USS Bon Homme Richard, is lost during ferry flight from NAS Cubi Point, the Philippines, to the carrier this date. Extensive search turns up no trace of plane or pilot CDR Frederick H. Whittemore, USN.

May
RAF Armstrong Whitworth Argosy C.1, XP444, of No. 70 Squadron RAF, departing a successful deployment in Libya, makes a "flypast" at a small airstrip called Gott-el-Afraq, hits water tower, crashes, killing all 22 on board.

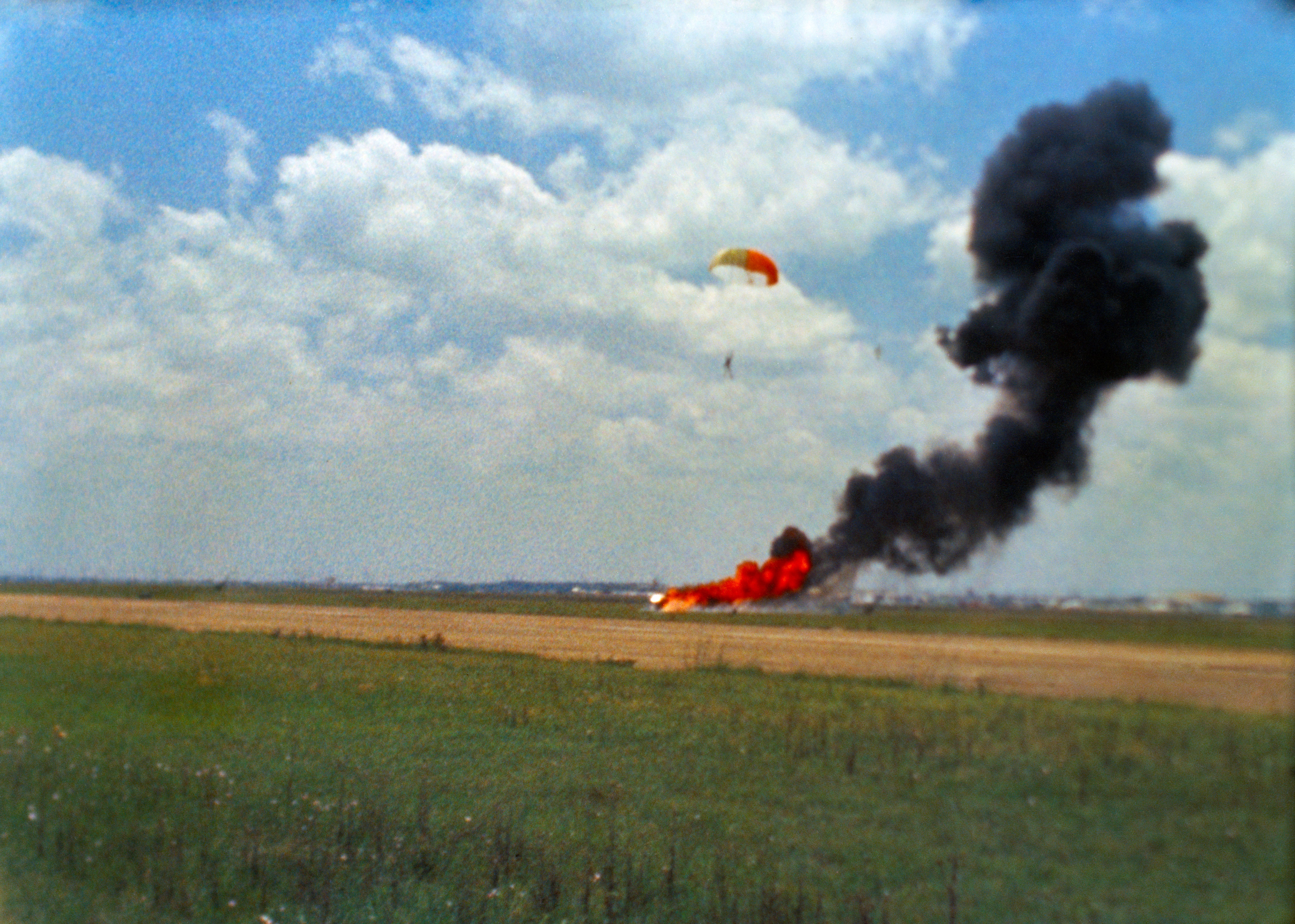
Armstrong floats to the ground after ejecting from LLRV 1.

6 May
Astronaut Neil Armstrong ejects from Bell Aerospace Lunar Landing Research Vehicle No. 1, known as the "Flying Bedstead", at NASA's Manned Spacecraft Center, Ellington Air Force Base, Houston, Texas, as it goes out of control. Had he ejected 1/2 second later, his parachute would not have deployed fully. Armstrong suffers a bit tongue.

12 May
United States Air Force Lockheed C-130B Hercules, 60-0297, is shot down during the Battle of Kham Duc; all 155 people on board are killed. At the time, it was the deadliest aircraft crash in history and remains the deadliest accident on Vietnamese soil.

25 May
Tupolev Tu-16R Badger F, bort number '94', commanded by sub-Cmdr. Alexander Pliyev, (also reported as both Pliev and Pliyeev) crashes into the Norwegian Sea after a low pass by the aircraft carrier USS Essex (CV-9). The bomber had flown by the ship just 15 meters above the sea. Hooked wingtip in a turn. U.S. Navy rescue forces find only wreckage.

31 May
Lockheed JQF-104A Starfighter drone, 56-0733, 'QFG-733', (so modified and designated on November 29, 1961), of the 3205th Drone Squadron, suffers a severe class A landing accident at Eglin Air Force Base, Florida. Repaired.

31 May
Lockheed U-2, 56-6954, Article 394, fourth airframe of the USAF supplementary production, delivered to the USAF in March 1959. Built as a two-place airframe for ARDC at Edwards Air Force Base, California, later designated a U-2D. Transferred to SAC in 1966 and converted to U-2C by January 1967. Crashed this date near Tucson, Arizona. Pilot Maj. Vic Milam ejects safely at 41,000 feet after losing control when airframe experiences uncontrolled pitch-up.

4 June
Lockheed A-12, 60–6932, Article 129, lost off of Okinawa during a functional check flight (FCF) following an engine change after deployment to Kadena Air Base in support of Operation Black Shield. Pilot Jack Weeks was killed while flying (KWF).One source gives date as 2 June. Another source lists the date as 5 June.

13 June
A U.S. Army Bell UH-1D-BF Huey helicopter, 66-01016, c/n 5499, of the 174th AHC, piloted by WO1 James Devrin Carter, on a Command and Control mission in South Vietnam, lands, picks up passengers and departs to fly a visual reconnaissance mission near the Demilitarized Zone (DMZ). The Operation Center at Đức Phổ near Đà Nẵng, South Vietnam, controlling the flight, receives a report that Carter's aircraft was involved in a mid-air collision with a U.S. Air Force O-2A-CE Skymaster, FAC aircraft, 67-21415, c/n 337M-0121, of the 20th Tactical Air Support Squadron, 504th Tactical Air Support Group, at ~1,000 feet altitude, both crashing near Quảng Ngãi City. Another helicopter crew in the area observes Carter's helicopter impact with the ground, stating that they did not see anyone escape from the site. The Huey burns. An element from an infantry unit airlifts to the crash sites, finds no survivors at either. KWF are (all U.S. Army) crew: AC WO1 Jerry Hampton Johnson, and gunners SP4 Gary Andrew Milton and PFC Allen Ray Weamer; passengers: Lt. Col. Frank Akeley Barker, Jr., Capt. Earl R. Michles, and 1st Lt. Michael Leon Phillips. No remains were recovered that could be associated with Carter. On subsequent searches, the remains of the pilot of the O-2, Major Brenner, and the crew of the UH-1D were recovered, but Carter's remains were never located.

7 July
A Navy Reserve Douglas A-4 Skyhawk suffers complete engine failure shortly after takeoff from Naval Air Station Glenview, Illinois, as it reaches 300 feet in altitude. Lt. William T. Reinders, 32, Harvey, turns left to the east seeking open space, finally ejects at 100 feet after stretching the glide as far as possible. He is catapulted across the Chicago & North Western Railway tracks and his streaming chute catches in a tree, saving him from hitting an apartment building. He sustains a broken arm and two broken legs. The A-4 strikes the Benjamin Masters home at 1325 Swainwood Drive, Glenview, 400 feet west of where Reinders landed, killing Cynthia Masters, 13.

19 August
Handley Page Victor K.1 XH646 of No. 214 Squadron RAF collided in mid-air near Holt, Norfolk, United Kingdom in bad weather with a 213 Squadron English Electric Canberra WT325, all four crew members of the Victor died.

11 September
Second prototype Grumman F-111B, BuNo 151971, c/n A2-02, crashes into the Pacific Ocean killing Hughes pilot Barton Warren and his RIO Anthony Byland.

23 September
General Dynamics F-111A, 66-0040, c/n A1-58, crashes and is destroyed this date due to control system failure, at Nellis Air Force Base, Nevada. Crew ejected safely.

24 September
A Boeing KC-135A-BN Stratotanker, 55-3133, c/n 17249, of the 509th Air Refueling Squadron, 509th Bombardment Wing, assigned to Pease Air Force Base, New Hampshire, crashes during an emergency landing at Wake Island, producing the first tanker casualty in the Southeast Asia war. The accident claims 11 of 52 Arc Light support personnel on board, assigned to the 509th Field Maintenance Squadron, redeploying from U-Tapao Royal Thai Navy Airfield, Thailand. After an in-flight engine failure, the undercarriage struck a seawall at the end of the runway — all the fatalities were in the rear fuselage.

10 October
Lockheed SR-71A, 61-7977, Article 2028, lost at end of runway, Beale Air Force Base, California after tire explosion and runway abort. Pilot Maj. Gabriel A. Kardong rode airframe to a standstill. RSO James A. Kogler ejected safely. Both survived.

11 October
Fifth prototype U.S. Navy Grumman F-111B, BuNo 151974, c/n A2-05, crash landed at Point Mugu, California. Scrapped. Both houses of Congress refuse to fund production order in May 1968 and Navy abandons the F-111B program completely.

1 November
Força Aérea Brasileira Aerotec A-122 Uirapuru pre-production two-place trainer crashes, killing Centro Técnico Aeroespacial test pilot José Mariotto Ferreira, one of the Centre's most experienced pilots.

8 December
Lunar Landing Research Vehicle No. 1 crashes at Ellington Air Force Base, Texas. NASA Manned Spacecraft Center test pilot Joseph Algranti ejects safely a mere three-fifths of a second before impact.

9 December
A Northrop F-89J Scorpion of the 124th Fighter Squadron, Iowa Air National Guard, crashes into a farm home near Story City, Iowa, while on a routine bomber interceptor training mission, killing both crew. Six members of the Peter Tjernagel family escaped the burning home without serious injury which was destroyed as was a corn crib. "The body of one of the plane's crewmen was found near the blazing wreckage. Story county Sheriff J. I. Shalley said the second crewman parachuted and was taken to a hospital. Authorities said later he also was dead." Air National Guard officials identified the pilot as Capt. John Rooks, of Eldora, and his radar interceptor as Lt. Larry Thomas of Ogden. "The crash two miles northeast of here hurled wreckage over an area of over a quarter of a mile. Some of the debris fell on nearby Interstate highway 35, closing the highway for a time." The Guard F-89Js were replaced in the summer of 1969 with F-84F Thunderstreaks.

13 December
U.S. Air Force Martin B-57E Canberra 54-4284 of the 8th Tactical Bombardment Squadron, 35th Tactical Fighter Wing, has mid-air collision with Fairchild C-123B-5-FA Provider 54-0600 over Xieng Khovang, southern Laos, all three crew of the B-57 KWF, pilot of C-123 survives bail-out, lands in tree, rescued by an HH-3, but six others are KWF.

== 1969 ==
13 January
Rivet Ball, a Strategic Air Command Boeing RC-135S, 59-1491, arriving at Shemya AFB, AK after a reconnaissance operational sortie, is unable to stop due to poor weather and extremely slippery runway conditions. The aircraft slid off the ice-covered runway, plunged into a 40-foot ravine and broke apart. All eighteen occupants of the aircraft egressed successfully. Although the aircraft was written off as damaged beyond repair, some key components were salvaged for subsequent use.

14 January
During an Operational Readiness Inspection aboard the USS Enterprise off Hawaii, an MK-32 Zuni rocket warhead attached to a McDonnell Douglas F-4 Phantom II is overheated by exhaust from an aircraft starting unit and detonates, setting off fires and additional explosions across the carrier. The fire is brought under control promptly when compared with previous carrier flight deck fires, but 27 lives are lost, and an additional 314 personnel are injured. The fire destroys 15 aircraft.

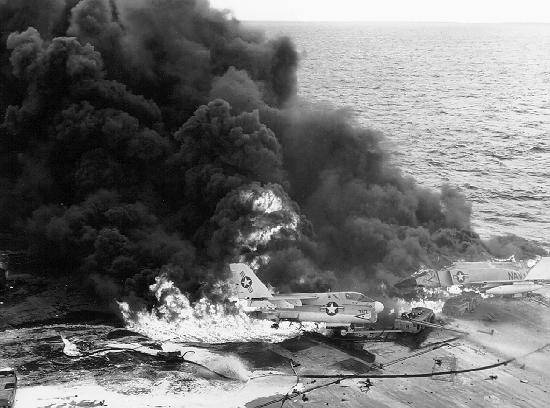
Sailors aboard Enterprise battle a massive ordnance fire triggered by a Zuni rocket. An LTV A-7 Corsair II and a McDonnell Douglas F-4 Phantom II are consumed in the fire on the fantail, 14 January 1969.

29 January
A Wisconsin Air National Guard Boeing KC-97L Stratofreighter, 52-0904, c/n 16598, arriving at Milwaukee-General Mitchell International Airport, (MKE/KMKE) on flight from Key West International Airport, Florida, in fog and rain (ceiling reported as 200 feet with 1/2 mile visibility), contacts ground 1/2 mile (.8 km) short (S) of runway, breaks up and catches fire with fatalities to four of 11 on board.

11 February
A Lockheed SP-2E Neptune, BuNo 131487, of a Navy Reserve unit based in Minneapolis, Minnesota, crashes in the Cleveland National Forest in the Santa Ana Mountains of Orange County, California, while on night training. Six crew killed while flying (KWF). The crew was serving two weeks of active duty at Naval Air Station Los Alamitos, 20 miles south of Los Angeles. The aircraft departed in the evening and headed for nearby MCAS El Toro for some night landing practice. The weather was somewhat cloudy and the rugged Santa Ana Mountains to the north were obscured. At 2023 hours local, a fighter jet flying over the area reported seeing a large fireball below him. The patrol plane was apparently executing a missed approach when its starboard wingtip struck the southern ridge of Harding Canyon. The aircraft cartwheels and disintegrates. KWF are Lt. Cmdr. Robert Frederick, pilot, 38, from White Bear, Minnesota; Lt. Cmdr. Beal Gordon Dolven Jr., co-pilot, 36, from Minneapolis; Lt. Cmdr. Oliver B. Walley, 34, from Menomonie, Wisconsin; Lt. John E. Surratt; Air Ordnanceman Walter R. Jacobson, 40, of St. Paul, Minnesota; Air Ordnanceman John Edward Hansen, 31, from Rochester, Minnesota; and Aviation Machinists Mate Harris R. Hendrickson, 47 of Minneapolis. Wings and tail of wreckage were removed, but much remains of the bomber in difficult, often near-vertical terrain.

19 February
The first major accident aboard USS John F. Kennedy, CVA-67, occurs this date, when a North American RA-5C Vigilante from Reconnaissance Attack Squadron (RVAH) 14 plunges into the water just after launch. A Kaman UH-2A Seasprite, BuNo 149748, from HC-2, Detachment 67, piloted by Lieutenants Robert E. Hofstetter and William H. Gregory, with Aviation Machinist's Mate (Jet Engine Mechanic) 3d class Dehey and Aviation Electrician's Mate 1st class Donald L. Lewis as rescue crewmen, retrieves Lieutenant (j.g.) John R. Ellis, the Vigilante's naval flight officer (NFO), but Lieutenant Commander Richard A. "Dick" Bright, the pilot, is lost with the airframe.

20 February
USS John F. Kennedy, CVA-67 suffers its second accident, only one day after the loss of an RA-5C Vigilante on launch, when a McDonnell-Douglas F-4J Phantom II from VF-101 is lost while attempting a night recovery. A Kaman UH-2A Seasprite, BuNo 149015, Angel 104, piloted by Lieutenant Gregory (who had been involved in the rescue the previous day) and Lieutenant (j.g.) Sokel, with Aviation Machinist's Mate (Jet Engine Mechanic) 3d class John H. Cooper and Aviation Electrician's Mate 1st class Lewis (who had also been involved in the previous day's rescue), retrieves Lieutenant (j.g.) Frank H. Lloyd, the pilot, and Lieutenant (j.g.) Robert D. Work, his radar intercept officer (RIO), both having ejected from the F-4J, accomplishing the task in total darkness, in the teeth of 35-knot winds and 8-to-10-foot seas, operations made even more difficult by the turbulence caused by the carrier upwind of the rescue site.

27 February
The night-time take-off crash of a Beechcraft U-8D Seminole at Milan, Italy, kills Major General John S. Hughes, 52, of Fort Worth, Texas, commander of all U.S. Army troops in northern Italy. He had assumed command of the United States southern Europe task force (SETAF) in May 1968. Also killed was pilot Major Edward Haislop, 32, of Parkersburg, West Virginia. Co-pilot Major Gordon Cooper, 34, also of Parkersburg, and Spc. 5/C Wallace Runyan, 21, originally of Fairbury, Illinois, but now residing in Milan, were reported in critical condition in a Milan clinic with fractures and burns. The U-8D apparently lost power on its engines as it lifted off and crashed into a huge advertising sign along a street just 300 yards from the airport. The airframe burned.

12 March
The Lockheed AH-56 Cheyenne test programme suffers a setback when the rotor on prototype #3, 66–8828, hits the fuselage and kills the pilot, David A. Beil. The accident occurs on a test flight where the pilot was to manipulate the controls to excite 0.5P oscillations (or half-P hop) in the rotor. 0.5P is a vibration that happens once per two main rotor revolutions, where P is the rotor rotational speed. The accident investigation noted that safety mechanisms on the controls had apparently been disabled for the flight. The investigation concluded that the pilot-induced oscillations had set up a resonant vibration that exceeded the rotor system's ability to compensate. After the investigation, the rotor and control systems were modified to prevent the same problem from occurring again. The rotor blades and control system were stiffened, the mass of the gyro was increased, and the geometry of the rotor was adjusted.

14 March
Lockheed XV-4B Hummingbird, 62-5404, on a conventional test flight out of Dobbins AFB, Georgia, suddenly enters rapid roll while climbing through 8,000 feet (2438 m), pilot Harlan J. "Hal" Quamme, unable to recover, ejects, suffering minor injuries. One civilian on ground receives minor injuries as well. Aircraft impacts ~20 miles from Dobbins AFB.

7 April
A Mitsubishi-assembled, from Sikorsky components, Sikorsky HSS-1N Seabat, 8567, c/n 58-1528, of the Japanese Maritime Self-Defense Force, crashes, the sole loss of the type during Japanese service.

11 April
Lockheed SR-71A, 61-7954, Article 2005, crashes on runway during take off from Edwards Air Force Base, California. Pilot Lt. Col. Bill Skliar and RSO Maj. Noel Warner escape without injury.

15 April
North Korean Mikoyan-Gurevich MiG-17s shoot down a Navy Lockheed EC-121M Warning Star, BuNo 135749, 'PR 21', c/n 4316, of VQ-1, call sign "Deep Sea 129", over the Sea of Japan, killing all 31 aboard. See EC-121 shootdown incident. KWF are pilot L/Cdr. James H. Overstreet; Lt. John N. Dzema; Lt. Dennis B. Gleason; Lt. Peter P. Perrottet; Lt. John H. Singer; Lt. Robert F. Taylor; Lt.JG Joseph R. Ribar; Lt.JG Robert J. Sykora; Louis F. Balderman, ADR2; Stephen C. Chartier, AT1; Bernie J. Colgin, AT1; Ballard F. Connors, Jr, ADR1; Gary R. DuCharme, CT3; Gene K. Graham, ATN3; LaVerne A. Greiner, AEC; Dennis J. Horrigan, ATR2; Richard H. Kincaid, ATN2; Marshall H. McNamara, ADRC; Timothy H. McNeil, ATR2; John A. Miller, CT3; John H. Potts, CT1; Richard T. Prindle, AMS3; Richard E. Smith, CTC; Philip D. Sundby, CT3; Richard E. Sweeney, AT1; Stephen J. Tesmer, CT2; David M. Willis, ATN3; and S/Sgt. Hugh M. Lynch, USMC.

5 May
U.S. Air Force North American F-100D-70-NA Super Sabre, 56-3214, one of two 452nd TFS, 81st TFW, RAF Lakenheath, Super Sabres on a gunnery mission over Holbeach Range, Cambridgeshire, UK, suffers engine failure, forcing the pilot, Capt. R.E. Riggs, to eject. The fighter impacts into farmland, missing a group of workers by 400 yards (370 m); airframe demolished in explosion, only fin and rudder assembly intact.

18 May
USMC Lockheed KC-130F Hercules BuNo 149814, c/n 3723, of VMGR-352, collided head-on with McDonnell F-4B Phantom II BuNo 151001 of VMFA-542, MAG-13, from Chu Lai Air Base (both crew killed), while refuelling two F-4Bs of VMFA-314 over South Vietnam near Phu Bai. Two crew of F-4B BuNo 151450, survived after jettisoning bombs and ejecting, while the second F-4B recovered safely to Chu Lai. Lars Olausson states that the KC-130F was from VMGR-352, while Chris Hobson claims it was assigned to VMGR-152.

23 May
A drunken U.S. Air Force assistant crew chief, Sgt. Paul Adams Meyer, 23, of Poquoson, Virginia, suffering anxiety over marital problems, starts up a Lockheed C-130E Hercules, 63-7789, c/n 3856, of the 36th Tactical Airlift Squadron, 316th Tactical Airlift Wing, on hardstand 21 at RAF Mildenhall and takes off in it at 0655 hrs CET, headed for Langley AFB, Virginia. At least two North American F-100 Super Sabres from RAF Lakenheath, a C-130 from Mildenhall, and two RAF English Electric Lightnings are sent aloft to try to make contact with the stolen aircraft. The Hercules crashes into the English Channel off Alderney (5000N, 0205W) ~90 minutes later. In the last transmission from Meyer, to his wife, in a link-up over the side-band radio, he stated "Leave me alone for about five minutes, I've got trouble." There is speculation whether the Hercules was shot down. Some wreckage was recovered but the pilot's body was never found. Meyer had been arrested for being drunk and disorderly earlier in the morning in the village of Freckenham and had been remanded to quarters, but sneaked out to steal the Hercules. The wreckage was rediscovered in 2018.

29 May
A USAF General Dynamics F-111 on a training flight out of Nellis AFB, Nevada, crashes from low altitude when deficient wind-shield bulged down from the top of the canopy bow and instantly crazed. Tactical Air Command replaces 50 F-111 windshields in 1969 and 93 in 1970.

5 June
Rivet Amber, the U.S. Air Force's sole Boeing RC-135E, 62-4137, c/n 18477, is lost over the Bering Sea near Alaska. This unique aircraft was the heaviest C-135 ever built and had a special radar weighing over 35,000 pounds and pod-mounted heat exchanger (right wing) and generator (left wing). Aircraft was approved for a return flight to the main operating base at Eielson AFB, AK for inspection of possible structural damage after a severe turbulence encounter on its previous operational sortie. About a half hour after takeoff the crew reported vibrations but indicated "aircraft under control." No further radio contact could be established. Nothing was ever found of the aircraft or the nineteen crewmen on board.

23 June
A Soviet Air Force Antonov An-12BP, c/n 402503, callsign "05825", collides in mid-air with Aeroflot Flight 831, an Ilyushin Il-14M, over the Yukhnovsky district, Kaluga Oblast, Soviet Union. All 120 people on both aircraft perish in the crash. The pilot of the Ilyushin Il-14 had disobeyed ATC instructions to stay below 2,700 m (8,900 ft) and the An-12 had been flying slightly below 3,000 m (9,800 ft).

18 September
A U.S. Air Force twin engine Douglas C-47 Skytrain crashed just after takeoff from McChord AFB in Tacoma, Washington. It came down in a wooded area just south of the runway. Five men died and seven other men were injured. Killed were Army 1st Lt. Joseph R. Baxter, assigned to Madigan General Hospital at neighboring Ft. Lewis, who died six hours after the crash; Lt. Col. Robert E. Walker, pilot and commander of a detachment of the 15th Weather Squadron at McChord; the co-pilot, Capt. Peter Cunningham of Tacoma; Air Force TSgt. Donald G. Love, the flight engineer, also assigned to McChord and an Army man, who was not immediately identified. The injured Air Force personnel were MSgt. William B. Johnston of McChord; Lt. Co!. Jack S. McKinley of Virginia; Sgt. William D. Wallace of West Virginia; TSgt. Billy D. Byrd of Tucson, Arizona; and Sgt. Charles L. Andrews of Florida. Injured Navy personnel were P02.C. Charles B. Nichols of California, and PO3.C. Darrell E. Calentine of California. Also injured was a retired Air Force MSgt. Granville Hicks of Missouri.

20 September
An Air Vietnam Douglas C-54D-10-DC Skymaster, XV-NUG, c/n 10860, collides on approach to landing with an American U.S. Air Force McDonnell F-4 Phantom II near Da Nang, Vietnam. 77 died.

9 October
A U.S. Air Force Boeing B-52F Stratofortress, 57-0172, of the 329th Bombardment Squadron (Heavy), 93d Bombardment Wing (Heavy) crashes about 1,000 feet beyond end of runway while doing touch-and-goes at Castle AFB, California. All six crew died in the 2345 hrs. accident as the Stratofortress exploded on impact.

25 October
Two United States Air Force Academy faculty members are killed when their Lockheed T-33 Shooting Star crashes and burned in a meadow near the main runway while landing at Peterson Field, Colorado. Pilot was Maj. Donald J. Usry, 32, of the academy faculty, and back-seater was Capt. Martin Bezyack, of the academy's athletic department.

16 December
U.S. Navy Vought RF-8G Crusader, BuNo 145611, of Detachment 19, VFP-63, crashes into the Gulf of Tonkin ~60 miles E of Đồng Hới, killing pilot Lt. Victor Patrick Buckley, of Falls Church, Virginia, while returning to the USS Hancock from a photographic reconnaissance mission. Cause of loss thought to be accidental.

18 December
Lockheed SR-71A, 61-7953, Article 2004, crashes near Shoshone, California, during a test flight out of Edwards Air Force Base, California, while operating as mission callsign "Dutch 68". Test force director and pilot Lt. Col. Joe Rogers and RSO Lt. Col. Gary Heidelbaugh eject safely, after the craft enters a deep stall as afterburners are engaged. Airframe breaks into three pieces as it comes down. It was fitted with the Optical Bar Camera (OBC) nose assembly for the first time on this flight. This SR-71 had accrued 290.2 flight hours.

22 December
A U.S. Navy Vought F-8J Crusader, BuNo 150879, of VF-194, crashes into Hangar 1 at NAS Miramar, California, during emergency landing, killing 14 and injuring 30. Pilot Lt. C. M. Riddell ejects safely. Five other fighters, including two McDonnell F-4 Phantom IIs (F-4J-31-MC, BuNo 153863, of VF-92; F-4J-34-MC, BuNo 155771 of VF-96), are damaged in the repair facility fire that ensues. Helicopters and military and civilian ambulances were used to transport the injured to Balboa Naval Hospital, San Diego.

22 December
A U.S. Air Force General Dynamics F-111A, 67-0049, c/n A1-94, crashes near Nellis AFB, Nevada, killing both crew, when starboard wing fails in flight, wing carry-through box failure, resulting in the fifth grounding order since the type entered service. Fifteen F-111s had crashed previously.

== See also ==
- List of accidents and incidents involving military aircraft
- List of C-130 Hercules crashes
