= List of accidents and incidents involving military aircraft (1990–1999) =

This is a list of accidents and incidents involving military aircraft grouped by the year in which the accident or incident occurred. Not all of the aircraft were in operation at the time. Combat losses are not included except for a very few cases denoted by singular circumstances.

== Aircraft terminology ==
Information on aircraft gives the type, and if available, the serial number of the operator in italics, the constructors number if the serial number is not known, also known as the manufacturer's serial number (c/n), exterior codes in apostrophes, nicknames (if any) in quotation marks, flight callsign in italics, and operating units.

== 1990 ==
12 January
USMC Douglas A-4M Skyhawk, 158149, of VMA-131, crashes on approach to NAS Willow Grove, Pennsylvania, after an engine fire, coming down in Upper Moreland Township, impacting in an intersection, debris tearing off roof of an auto-leasing business, destroying four autos, and damaging six houses, but no injuries on the ground. Pilot Capt. Duane Pandorf, 35, parachutes into tree, suffering only minor injuries.

23 January
Mid-air collision between two Blue Angels McDonnell-Douglas F/A-18 aircraft during a practice session at El Centro. One airplane, Angel Number 2, 161524, piloted by Capt Chase Moseley (ejected) was destroyed and the other, Angel Number 1, badly damaged but managed to land safely. Both pilots survived unharmed.

6 February
A USAF General Dynamics F-111E, 68-0001, known as "Balls 1", out of RAF Upper Heyford, crashes into the North Sea off the east coast of England during a routine training mission, killing two crew. The Third Air Force identified the crew as pilot Capt Clifford W. Massengill, 30, of Edenton, North Carolina, and WSO 1st Lt Thomas G. Dorsett, 26, of Pensacola, Florida.

7 February
A USAF Fairchild-Republic A-10 Thunderbolt II crashes in the Black Mountains of Wales, UK, around eight miles S of Hay-on-Wye, less than 18 hrs. after a General Dynamics F-111 was lost in the North Sea. Captain Bradley Burrows, the A-10 pilot was killed. Lt Gen Marcus Anderson, commander of the Third Air Force, grounds all British-based tactical fighters for a one-day safety review, although an Air Force press spokesman said the two accidents were unrelated, calling it "a terrible coincidence" that they occurred so close together.

12 February
A USMC pilot died and a reconnaissance observer was hurt when they ejected almost simultaneously from separate aircraft during training missions at the Marine Corps Air Ground Combat Center Twentynine Palms, Twentynine Palms, California. Capt Thomas Kolb, 28, of San Diego, California, was killed after ejecting from his McDonnell-Douglas AV-8B Harrier II, BuNo 163187, from VMA-223, based at MCAS Cherry Point, North Carolina, which crashed in a remote area of range N of Twentynine Palms. Aerial observer Capt Jeffrey P. Schade, of Southold, New York, ejected from North American OV-10 Bronco, suffering minor injuries. The Bronco landed safely.

23 February
A Marine Corps student pilot and his U.S. Navy instructor from Whiting Field, Florida, were killed after two Beechcraft T-34C Turbo Mentors collided in mid-air, near Summerdale, Alabama. One aircraft crashed near the edge of the field, killing the instructor pilot, LT Gordon Bruce Wulf, 29, a Wichita, Kansas, native who lived in Cantonment, Florida, and his student, Marine 1st Lt Cary K. Smith Jr., 25, of Columbia, South Carolina. The second aircraft made an emergency landing at another outlying field about 15 miles away near Silverhill, Alabama, with only slight damage and without injury to the instructor pilot or his student.

16 March
A USAF F-16A in route from Hill AFB crashed in the western Utah Salt Flats due to an engine failure 3 miles (4.8 km) east of Wendover Air Force Base. The pilot ejected safely.

22 March
Two F-16A fighters from the 419th Tactical Fighter Wing collided midair 30 miles (48 km) southeast of Wendover, Utah. Both pilots ejected safely. 10 minutes later an F-16C caught fire and made an emergency landing at Wendover AFB.

19 March
A McDonnell-Douglas F-15C Eagle, 80-0002, of the 3d Wing, stationed at Elmendorf AFB, Alaska, accidentally fired an AIM-9M Sidewinder missile at F-15C, 81-0054. The damaged aircraft was able to make an emergency landing; it was subsequently repaired and returned to service, finally retired to AMARG, 8 September 2009. According to one account, the wing commander was relieved over this incident.

8 April
A McDonnell Douglas F-4 Phantom II crashed and caught fire at St. Louis Lambert International Airport in Missouri. Capt. Carl Arizpe and Lt. Kevin Greeley of the 131st Tactical Fighter Wing of the Missouri Air National Guard suffered minor injuries.

17 April
Two McDonnell Douglas CF-18 Hornets, 188779 and 188765, of the 439 Combat Support Squadron based at CFB Baden–Soellingen, Germany, collided in midair over the nearby city of Karlsruhe, killing pilot Capt. Timothy Kirk Leuty. Capt. Reg Decoste safely ejected and escaped injury despite landing on a busy highway. Debris was scattered across the city causing damage to buildings and cars but no injuries on the ground.

25 April
McDonnell-Douglas F-15C Eagle, 81-0049, of the 32d Tactical Fighter Squadron, 79th Test and Evaluation Group, based at Soesterberg AB, Netherlands, suffered an engine fire while flying in a three ship formation during Exercise Elder Forest and subsequently lost all hydraulic power. Pilot major George D. Hulsey ejected safely and was picked up by an oil-rig supply vessel. Aircraft crashed into the North Sea, 9 miles off Spurn Point, Humberside, United Kingdom

30 April

An Avro Shackleton, of No. 8 Squadron RAF crashes into a hill on the Isle of Harris, in Scotland. All ten crew on board die in the accident. It was later determined to be a CFIT, but no reason was found as to why.

10 May
A McDonnell Douglas F-15 Eagle of the USAF, originating probably from Ramstein Air Base, near-misses a Danish civil aircraft near Hermeskeil, Eifel, West Germany. During the evasive maneuver three passengers in the civil aircraft were injured.

25 May
An F-16A 81-0798, USAF, Moody AFB, 347th TFW, 68th TFS, crashed 1.8 miles north of Pearson, Georgia, 400 feet east of US Highway 221/441. The aircraft bounced upon impact, destroying at least two houses, and a parked car, as well as killing a civilian Marion Lanier, a cleaning woman who was making her weekly visit to a client’s home. The crash also killed the pilot, Lieutenant Colonel A. Stuart (call sign "OTTO23").

30 May
Two USAF LTV A-7 Corsair IIs of the 175th Tactical Fighter Squadron, 114th Tactical Fighter Group, South Dakota Air National Guard, collide in mid-air and crash in a "ball of flame" over northwestern Iowa near Spencer, Iowa, during mock combat, both pilots and a civilian passenger eject safely. The flight consisted on an A-7D single-seater 70-1050, and A-7K 80-0292 a two-seater.

9 August
A Panavia Tornado IDS, tactical number 45+11 of the German Air Force was severely damaged on station of the Büchel Air Base.

24 August
A fatal aircraft landing accident involving a U.S. Coast Guard Grumman E-2C Hawkeye, CG 3501, of CGAW-1, based at CGAS St. Augustine, Florida, while returning to the former Naval Station Roosevelt Roads in Puerto Rico where the mission originated, prompted the Coast Guard to discontinue flying E-2Cs and to return all of its eight remaining borrowed airframes to the U.S. Navy. The Hawkeye's port engine caught fire and the aircraft crashed on short final in a cow pasture one quarter mile from the runway, all four crew KWF. A granite memorial to LT Duane Stenbak, LT Craig Lerner, LT Paul Perlt, and AT1 Matthew Baker was dedicated at St. Augustine's City Hall Square on 23 August 1991. Another plaque honoring the four was placed near St. Augustine lighthouse.

29 August
A C-5 Galaxy, 68-0228, crashed after take off from Ramstein Air Base, killing 13 of its crew on board and injuring 4 more. The plane was on its way to Saudi Arabia with medical supplies, food & maintenance equipment in support of US Troops stationed there, following the Iraqi invasion of Kuwait. The investigation concluded that the cause was an uncommanded & inadvertent deployment of the thrust reverser on Engine No.1 during takeoff.

9 September
Rimantas Antanas-Antonovich Stankiavicius (1944–1990), a Lithuanian test pilot selected as a cosmonaut and serving as a pilot for the Buran, is killed in the crash of a Sukhoi Su-27 fighter, '14 Red', at the Salgareda Air Show at Treviso, Italy.

19 September
While flying a training mission in preparation for Operation Desert Storm over the Fallon, Nevada desert, First Lieutenant Andrew G. "Andy" Baer a Weapons Systems Officer and Captain Ralph Miller a pilot with the Indiana Air National Guard's 181st Fighter Group, 113th Fighter Squadron, based at the Hulman International Airport in Terre Haute, IN were killed while flying their F-4 Phantom II during a high-speed, low-altitude turning maneuver. At the outset of the mishap, Lt. Baer initiated the dual-sequenced ejection seats however due to their low altitude and the aircraft's attitude those life saving systems were unsuccessful and Lt. Andrew Baer and his pilot, Captain Ralph Miller (who were both natives of Terre Haute, Indiana and fellow graduates of both Terre Haute North High School and Indiana State University) were unable to survive the incident.

19 September
An F-16C 89-2027, USAF, Moody AFB, 347th TFW, 70th TFS, just three weeks after delivery, crashed 12 nautical miles south-west of Allendale, South Carolina, at 20:27, killing the pilot, Lieutenant Colonel Barry Bost (call-sign "NOBBY 91").The board of inquiry concluded that the aircraft caught fire in flight, and that the pilot did not eject from his F-16 before impact.

30 September
SH-60B, BuNo 162343 of HSL-43, crashed into sea off Oregon killing all three crew aboard while deployed with USS Crommelin (FFG-37) at the time, headed north along the western coast off Oregon during workups.

29 October
An AH-64A, tail # 86-8954 crashed after a wire strike just north of Nuremburg, Germany. The aircraft was assigned to B Co. 4th Bn, 229th Advanced Attack Helicopter Regiment, 11th Avn Bde, VII Corps, and was based at Illesheim AAF in Illesheim, Germany. The company was participating in a night deep attack training mission and was returning to Illesheim when the aircraft (the 4th or 5th aircraft in the formation) struck the power line approximately 245 AGL. The crash was witnessed by one of the accompanying OH-58C scout helicopters, and another AH-64 landed at the accident site to render assistance, but both the pilot (CW3 Johnny Wilkinson), and co-pilot gunner (CW2 Ed Hall) were killed in the crash. The unit was training for deployment to Saudi Arabia as part of Operation DESERT STORM at the time of the crash.

6 November
Crew of a US Navy Grumman A-6E Intruder, '506', of VA-176, suffering an engine fire, aimed the aircraft away from the Virginia Beach, Virginia oceanfront before ejecting just after take-off from NAS Oceana, Runway 5. Aircraft comes down at 2215 hrs. in the Atlantic Ocean ~.75 miles offshore, after just clearing the Station One Hotel, on-shore breeze carries crew inland about three blocks from the beach, one landing in a tree, the other in a courtyard of a condominium, suffering only cuts and bruises. Aircraft, on routine training mission, was unarmed. Officials did not identify the crew, but said the pilot was a 29-year-old lieutenant, and the bombardier-navigator was a 34-year-old lieutenant commander, both assigned to VA-176.

6 December

An Italian Air Force Aermacchi MB-326 jet, of 603 SC, crashes into a high school in Casalecchio di Reno, Italy. Twelve students are killed, 84 more are severely injured. The pilot ejected after losing control of the aircraft.

== 1991 ==
14 January
A USAF Bell UH-1N Twin Huey crashed during a training mission near Edwards Air Force Base, killing Captain John Augustine and Sergeant Robert Lovell. Sergeant William Tyler and Major Alan Resnicke were injured. No other aircraft were involved.

15 January
A Soviet Air Force Tupolev Tu-16K crashes at Tartu Air Base, Estonia, on landing when wheels lock up. Pilot and copilot eject, but four other crew are killed.

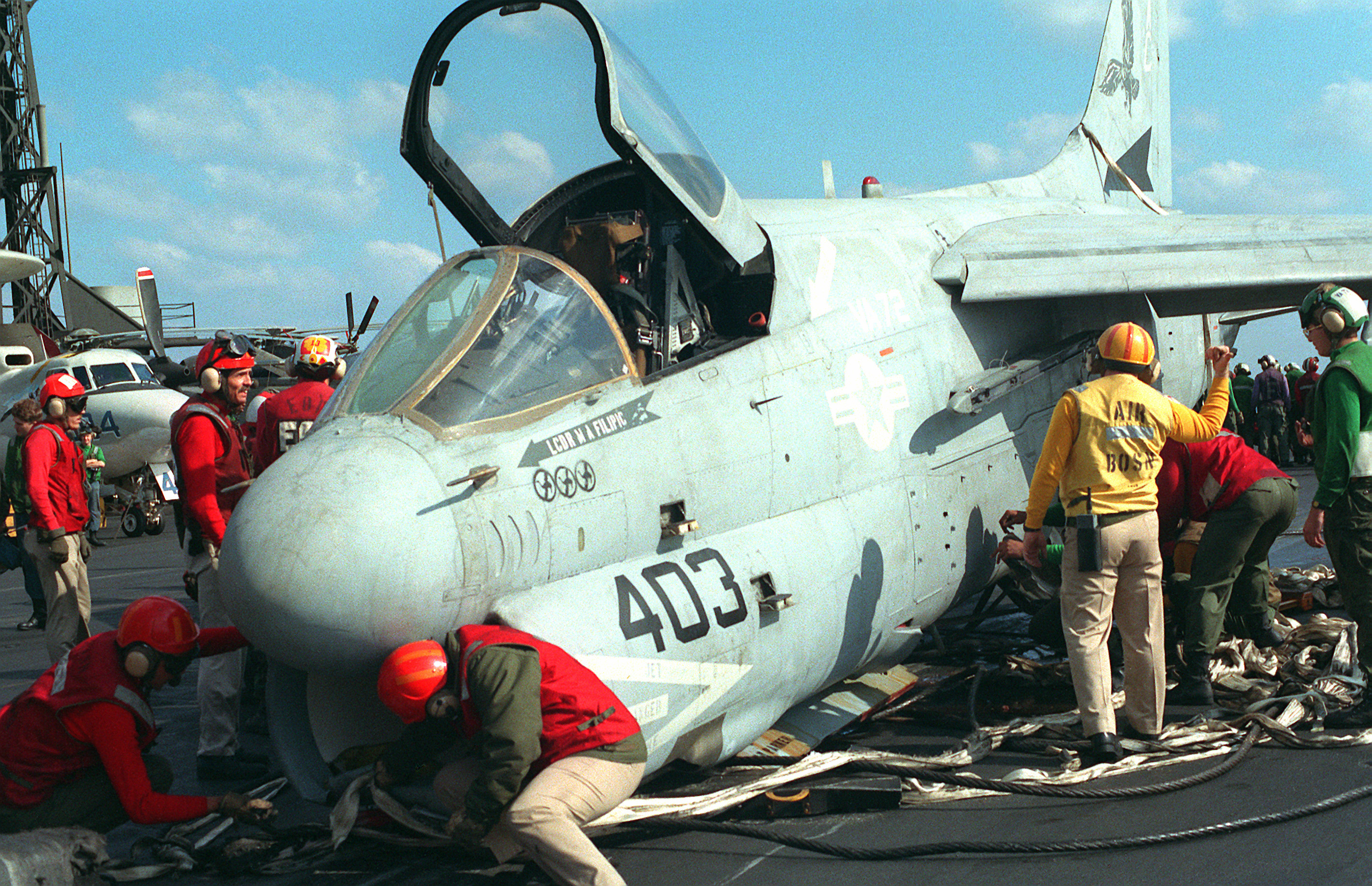
Last US Navy A-7E barrier crash, aboard USS John F. Kennedy.

24 January
LTV A-7E Corsair II, BuNo 158830, 'AC 403', of VA-72 has the dubious distinction of being the last of the type in US Navy service to need a barricade landing aboard a carrier when the nose gear was damaged on catapult launch from the USS John F. Kennedy, at start of mission 12.41 against a target in western Iraq, losing one tire. Pilot, Lt. Tom Dostie, succeeds in hooking 1-wire and aircraft snags safely in barricade. Since the A-7 type was about to be retired, airframe is stripped for parts and buried at sea 25 January with full military honors, but refuses to sink until strafed by air wing jets. This disposition is in question, however. Joe Baugher states that there is an A-7 marked as 158830 preserved in Museo dell'Aviazione near Rimini, Italy. It was reported as damaged during Desert Storm and was left at Sigonella, Italy.

6 February

A Boeing KC-135E Stratotanker was involved in an accident when two engines on the left wing of the aircraft detached. The pilots managed to successfully executed an emergency landing saving all four crew members onboard. The aircraft was later repaired and returned to service.

20 February
Petty Officer John David Bridges is sucked into the port intake of a Grumman A-6E Intruder, of VA-65, in a 0341.11 hrs. flight deck accident on board USS Theodore Roosevelt as the attack jet powers up to move onto the catapult. He is saved when the pilot hears the crewman's helmet and safety goggles ingest into the engine and shuts down immediately. Bridges, who was caught momentarily in the intake, is saved by the pilot's quick reaction and is able to crawl out suffering various minor injuries. The US Navy now uses film of this incident as a training tool and revised deck procedures to avoid a recurrence.

3 March
US Navy North American CT-39G Sabreliner, BuNo 160057, crashed at 1145 hrs. in a neighborhood ~.5 miles S of NAS Glenview, Illinois, killing three crew, but missing houses. No one on ground was injured and witnesses said the pilot appeared to intentionally avoid structures, the jet coming down 20 feet from homes.

19 March
A Jodel Mousquetaire used for training flights by the Military Air Transport Command crashed near Port-Sainte-Marie, killing three crew members and seriously injuring the fourth.

20 March
Cuban Air Force pilot Major Orestes Lorenzo Perez defects in his Mikoyan-Gurevich MiG-23BN to Naval Air Station Key West, Florida.

21 March
Two US Navy Lockheed P-3C Orion anti-submarine patrol aircraft, P-3C 158930 coded 'SG 12', and P-3C 159325, 'SG 8', are lost during an ASW training mission off the San Diego, California coast when they collide in bad weather. The crash occurs in a storm 60 miles SW of San Diego at 0226 hrs., as one aircraft flies to relieve the other, which had been airborne for seven hours. Search-and-rescue workers discover wreckage from the downed aircraft but all 27 crewmen are lost, 13 on one and 14 on the other. USS Abraham Lincoln, the destroyer USS Merrill (DD-976) and at least two other ships, along with helicopters and fixed-wing aircraft, were assisting in the search. A Navy helicopter crew flying in the area and sailors from the Merrill reported a ball of fire and loud explosion about 0230 PST, said Senior Chief Petty Officer Bob Howard, a Navy public affairs officer at NAS North Island, during a briefing at that base. "It is very cold out there. We're talking about what apparently is a mid-air collision...two aircraft. I would say it would be very grim." The two Orions were assigned to Patrol Squadron 50 (VP-50), based at Naval Air Station Moffett Field in Mountain View, California. Crewmen of a miniature Navy sub located wreckage from the aircraft 29 May following a month-long search of the ocean floor. No bodies were found after the accident and no remains of any crew members are known to have been recovered. The Navy ended the search on 18 July, and said that a navy court of inquiry would reconvene 22 July at NAS North Island to hear more testimony to try to make a final determination of what caused the accident. Radar tapes from the Fleet Area Control and Surveillance Facility at North Island show the aircraft were flying at their assigned altitudes of 3,500 feet and 2,500 feet when one pilot suddenly veered up and smashed into the belly of the other aircraft. Investigators believe pilot error was involved in the accident, one of the worst in recent military history. Mechanical failure, air traffic controller error and weather have been ruled out as possible causes. Radar tapes reviewed during earlier court of inquiry sessions show that one aircraft had been in the air 7 1/2 hours, veered up and struck the other craft that was arriving to relieve it. Both pilots were flying under visual flight rules and were not receiving flight instructions from the Fleet Area Control and Surveillance Facility, which was monitoring the exercise. The pilots had requested permission to change to a radio frequency not normally monitored at the facility shortly before communication stopped between the two aircraft. A granite memorial was placed outside the Officers' Club (Building 3) at NAS Moffett Field, listing all of the lost crew "still on station." VP-50 was disestablished at NAS Moffett Field on 21 May 1992 after which the aircraft were transferred to VP-22. The official disbandment was on 30 June 1992. NAS Moffett Field itself would be disestablished on 1 July 1994".

21 March
A Royal Saudi Air Force C-130H carrying 92 Senegalese soldiers and six Saudi crew members, crashes en route to Ras Mishab Airport, killing all aboard.

6 April
Islamic Republic of Iran Air Force Grumman F-14A Tomcat crashed at unknown location, killing both crew.

28 May
A Sikorsky MH-60G Pave Hawk based at Eglin AFB, Florida, crashes off Antigua in the Caribbean, injuring six of eight aboard, but no fatalities. Although initially reported to have been on a training mission, an accident report obtained by the Northwest Florida Daily News, Fort Walton Beach, Florida, in August, revealed that the crew was sightseeing, taking pictures over beachside hotels and harbors, when the accident occurred.

4 June
A student pilot died after ejecting from his North American T-2C Buckeye 158877 coded 'F 807', of VT-4, CTW-6, based at NAS Pensacola, Florida, which impacted on an embankment on the south side of Berryhill Road extension, N of Pace, Florida about 1300 hrs.

5 June
A Royal Australian Air Force McDonnell-Douglas F/A-18A Hornet, A21-041, of 75 Squadron, crashes 100 kilometres NE of Weipa, Queensland. The pilot was killed. The wreckage was found in July 1994.

11 June
The first crash involving a Bell-Boeing Osprey occurs when the fifth MV-22, BuNo 163915, three minutes into its maiden flight at a Boeing flight test facility at Wilmington, Delaware, suffers problems with the gyros due to incorrect wiring in the flight-control system and crashes into the ground from a 15-foot (4.6 metre) hover during an attempted landing, the left rotor striking first, the airframe turning over and catching fire. Two crew eject and survive. Two of the three roll-rate gyros had been wired in reverse. "To compound the problem, the flight control built-in test was not run before the flight. With the flight control voting logic discounting the correct gyro signal, the aircraft was doomed." As this airframe was heavily damaged on its acceptance flight, it never officially entered service. This airframe had been slated for avionics integration, autopilot, aircrew training, and operational evaluation.

19 June
A USMC Bell AH-1 Cobra crashed into a U.S. Navy weapons station during night training at Camp Pendleton, killing Lt. Col. David A. Knott and Capt. Michael M. Vagedes.

24 June
A USAF Northrop T-38 Talon crashed at Sheppard Air Force Base. USAF Second Lieutenant Michael D. Higley and Italian Air Force Major Domenico Orlando, part of NATO personnel at Sheppard, died.

9 July
Bombardier-Navigator Lt. Keith Gallagher suffers partial ejection from U.S. Navy Grumman KA-6D Intruder 152911 coded '515', of VA-95, from the USS Abraham Lincoln in the Indian Ocean, four days out of Singapore headed NW for patrol duty in the Persian Gulf. While flying at 8,000 feet, seven miles abeam the ship, heading aft, the B/N's ejection seat suffers an uncommanded partial activation of the ejection seat, which leaves him hanging out of the canopy. Pilot Lt. Mark Baden makes immediate return to the ship, lands safely, Gallagher surviving and returning to flight duty six months later. Pilot is awarded the Navy Air Medal and the LSO on the carrier the "Bug Roach Paddles Award" for his part in the successful recovery.

30 July
A United States Air Force F-16D from the 388th Fighter Wing at Hill AFB crashed in Nevada killing Captain Keith G. Nylander.

15 August
A Panavia Tornado IDS, tactical number 44+74 of the GAF crashed near Hühnerberg / Bad Ems. The aircraft was destroyed, no information about the crew.

16 August
A USN Boeing Vertol CH-46 Sea Knight crashed into the sea approximately 100 miles east of Wake Island. The four airmen, Lt. Eric W. Allison, Lt. Kenneth D. Pickens, Airmen William A. Jackson, and Petty Officer 1st Class Johnn L. Caulder, Jr., were presumed dead.

31 August
A Tomahawk missile launched from a warship in the Gulf of Mexico to recover on a target on the test ranges at Eglin AFB, Florida, misses by approximately 100 miles, coming down eight miles east of Jackson, Alabama, around 60 miles north of Mobile. "Within minutes of the missile's falling near Jackson, a recovery team arrived by helicopter. Such teams are stationed along the missile's flight path during a test so they can get to a crash scene within 20 minutes no matter where the Tomahawk goes down." Cause was found to be two incorrect screws used to assemble a tailfin, said Denny Kline, a Pentagon spokesman for the Navy Cruise Missile Project, on 13 December 1991. A screw, rubbing against an actuator coil disabled one of the missile's two fins. "Somebody during assembly put two screws in, which were moderately too long. Well, in fact, in this case extremely too long because it physically made contact with a coil. It was fine for the first one hour and 21 minutes, but over time it wore away the protective coating and got down to the wound part of the coil and shorted it out," said Kline. As a result, one fin worked properly but the other did not when the missile was to make a pre-planned turn causing it to crash in Alabama. The wrong screws were put in by General Dynamics Corp., said Susan Boyd, Pentagon spokeswoman for the missile program. Four Tomahawks have landed in civilian areas since the Navy began the gulf tests in 1985. There have been no injuries.

14 September
A Sikorsky MH-53 Sea Dragon crashes into the Persian Gulf at 2105 hrs., shortly after taking off from the USS Peleliu, 40 miles N of Bahrain. All 6 service members on board were killed. The aircraft was part of squadron HM-15 based out of Naval Air Station Alameda, near San Francisco.

5 October
Vladimir A. Yakimov attempts a vertical landing on the stern flight deck of the Soviet aircraft carrier Admiral Gorshkov (ex-Baku) in Yakovlev Yak-141 (Yak-41M), 48-3, callsign "77", but during heavy touchdown the undercarriage ruptures a fuel tank, causing a serious fire. About 25 seconds later, Yakimov ejected successfully, and was rescued from the sea. The aircraft was later repaired and placed on display at the Yakovlev OKB Museum.

5 October

A Lockheed C-130 Hercules transporting soldiers to Bandung following an Armed Forces Day ceremony in Jakarta, Indonesia crashed into a Department of Labor training building when one of its engines exploded and another failed approximately three minutes following takeoff. The 132 people aboard the craft and one security guard in the building were killed.

9 October
On Wednesday, four members of a Sikorsky SH-3H Sea King crew operating from the Norfolk, Virginia-based USS America were presumed lost after the aircraft crashed during a training mission near Bermuda, the Navy said Friday. The helicopter was assigned to the Anti-Submarine Squadron 11 at the Naval Air Station Jacksonville, Florida, The crewmen were identified as: Lt. Richard D. Calderon, 26, of Jacksonville, Florida; Lt. Cmdr. Karl J. Wiegand, 35, of Orange Park, Florida; aviation anti-submarine warfare operator Karl J. Wicklund, 23, of Clear Lake, Minnesota; and aviation anti-submarine warfare operator Vincent W. Bostwick, 20, of Orange Park, Florida.

10 October
A USAF Bell UH-1N Twin Huey crashed near Edwards Air Force Base in California, killing Captain Jay D. Burdett, who had been investigating the January 14th crash of the same type of craft at the same location. His investigation had determined an issue with the main drive shaft and the lubricating grease used.

11 October
The crash of a Beechcraft T-34C Turbo-Mentor in Baldwin County, Alabama, kills Navy Cmdr. Duane S. Cutter, 44, from Newfield, New York, and his student, Marine 2nd Lt. Thomas J. Gaffney, 24, of West Chester, Pennsylvania, while on a routine training mission out of NAS Whiting Field, Florida, said Lt. Cmdr. Diane Hooker, a Navy spokeswoman at Whiting Field. Hooker couldn't immediately say what techniques the two were practising when the T-34 went down.

16 October
A USMC Bell UH-1 Iroquois from Marine Corps Base Camp Pendleton crashed in an alfalfa field southeast of the Salton Sea around 5:00 PM. Four Marines died in the crash: Master Sgt. Joe C. Snell Jr., Captain Daniel J. Adams, Captain Phillip G. Chapman, and Jeffrey D. Couch.

29 October
A Royal Australian Air Force Boeing 707-368C A20-103 stalled and crashed into the sea near RAAF Base East Sale, Victoria, Australia, killing all five crew. The crash was attributed to a simulation of asymmetric flight resulting in a sudden and violent departure from controlled flight.

30 October
A Canadian Forces Lockheed CC-130E Hercules on a supply mission slammed into the frozen tundra near Alert, Nunavut. Pilot error caused the crash, which led to the five deaths, but 13 survived for 32 hours in the cold arctic prior to rescue. The event was made into the television film Ordeal in the Arctic.

14 November
A USAF F-16B assigned to the 419th Tactical Fighter Wing at Hill AFB crashed 10 miles (16 km) northwest of the Great Salt Lake in Utah, killing Capt. Arnold Clarke and Capt. Michael Sowell.

20 November

A helicopter carrying Azerbaijani military personnel and peacekeeper observers crashed in hilly terrain near Karakend during the Nagorno-Karabakh conflict either due to hostile weapons fire or losing altitude during foggy conditions or from both. All 22 passengers and crew on board perished.

30 November
During routine training mission, pilot Lt. Michael Young, 28, bailed out of his disabled USAF LTV A-7D-9-CV Corsair II 70-1054 of the 180th Tactical Fighter Group, Ohio Air National Guard, based at Toledo Express Airport, Swanton, Ohio, over the coast of Michigan's Thumb area. He landed in Lake Huron, and was dragged 12 miles in his parachute by winds before being lost and presumed drowned. The jet crashed in a wooded area near Port Hope, Michigan. Rescuers were unable to reach the pilot at the speed he was being dragged, and survival was unlikely in the 38-degree water. Waves were too large to deploy Coast Guard vessels. A passing freighter located the pilot still in the parachute harness. The freighter crew attempted to hook the parachute and bring the pilot up. Evidently the pilot had been able to partially release his parachute harness before drowning and when the freighter crew attempted to pull up the parachute, the pilot slipped out of the harness and his body was not recovered. Wurtsmith Air Force Base Command Post had been notified by a local sheriff department that a parachute had been seen. Wurtsmith Air Force Base Command Post Controllers immediately notified Selfridge Air Force Reserve Base Command to take over responsibility as it was in Selfridge's area of responsibility.

2 December
A Dassault Falcon 20E, registered F-UGWP, crashed in Élancourt, France. According to the investigation, ice detached from the wings and struck the engines, causing a double engine failure. Four military personnel were killed.

== 1992 ==
9 January
A Belgian Air Force General Dynamics F-16 Fighting Falcon crashed near Euskirchen, West-Germany close to an Autobahn-junction.

13 January
General Dynamics F-16 Fighting Falcon, 84-1267, of the 184th TFG out of McConnell Air Force Base, Kansas Air National Guard was returning from a practice firing sortie of a M61A1 20 mm cannon, and in the process of beginning touch-and-goes. Major David Ternes of the 127th Fighter Squadron was bringing the aircraft into McConnell AFB when he experienced trouble at 11:06 hours. Ternes was forced to eject at 150 feet and two miles from base. The aircraft tore through a house nearly hitting the sole occupant. Both the pilot and the home's occupant survived uninjured. The cause was determined to be a lack of engine response.

14 January
VF-1 lost aircraft NE-112 (BuNo. 160887) in a crash at Fallon, Nevada. Both aircrew members were killed in the crash. Fighter Squadron 1 (United States Navy)#cite ref-6

15 January
Lockheed U-2R, 68-10332, Article 054 of the 9th SRW crashed into the Sea of Japan off the Korean coast this date while on flight out of Osan Air Base, South Korea, pilot Capt. Marty McGregor killed. This was the first of five U-2 losses (and four pilots) suffered by the newly formed Air Combat Command in its first five years. Prior to the ACC takeover, there had been no Class A mishaps in the previous eight years. A team of six old U-2 hands, known as the "Graybeard panel," was assembled by ACC to examine the problem.

6 February
A Kentucky Air National Guard Lockheed C-130B Hercules 58-0732 of the 165th Tactical Airlift Squadron, 123d Tactical Airlift Wing, out of Standiford Field, Louisville Air National Guard Base, Kentucky, stalled and crashed into the JoJo's restaurant and Drury Inn at U.S. 41 and Lynch Road at 0953 while practicing touch and go manoeuvers at the Evansville, Indiana Airport, when a supervising instructor-pilot, simulated an engine failure. The pilot who was relatively inexperienced in the type, became distracted with checklists and air traffic control commands and let the airspeed bleed off as the C-130 climbed to 1,300 feet. When it dropped below its in-flight minimum control speed, the aircraft stalled and banked to port, into the dead engine. The IP took control and began to correct but had insufficient altitude for recovery. All five crew members and eleven people on the ground were killed. Several others were injured. The Hercules descended almost vertically on the rear of Jojos, demolishing the kitchen, and spraying burning jet fuel – later estimated by military officials at 6,000 gallons – on the center north wall of the neighboring Drury Inn. Room 416, where 13 employees of Plumbing and Industrial Supply Company were conducting a quality-control seminar, was engulfed by the fireball. Only four in the room escaped, all but one with severe burns. P and I Supply lost a third of its workforce. Two restaurant employees were also killed, trapped under rubble. The Air Force paid out $36.3 million to settle wrongful death, personal injury and property damage claims. "Military training exercises at Evansville Regional Airport using C-130 aircraft essentially stopped after the 1992 crash." Room 416 of the Inn is no longer publicly used.

April
A Marine Corps Boeing-Vertol CH-46E Sea Knight suffered a catastrophic explosion and crashed into the Red Sea, killing four Marines including the pilot and injuring eight Marines.

15 April
A U.S. Navy North American T-2C Buckeye crashed in the Gulf of Mexico shortly after launch from training carrier USS Forrestal, operating ≈70 miles S of NAS Pensacola, Florida. Both instructor pilots ejected but the rescue helicopter only retrieved Lt. Tim Fisher of VT-19, based at NAS Meridian, Mississippi, while the other pilot was never found. This was the first training accident since the Forrestal became a training carrier on 4 February 1992.

25 April
Second prototype Lockheed YF-22A N22YX, suffered severe damage during start of a go-around when it belly-flopped at Edwards AFB, California, following eight seconds of pilot-induced oscillation at an altitude of 40 feet when test pilot Tom Morgenfeld ignored a test-card requiring the 2-D convergent-divergent thrust nozzles to be locked in position during this stage of the PIO tests. Control surface actuators hit rate limiters, causing commands to get out of synchronization with their execution; the test fighter hit the ground and skidded several thousand feet, inducing fire that destroyed 25 percent of the airframe. The aircraft never flew again, being rebuilt as a shell and subsequently used to test antennae at the Rome Air Development Center, Griffiss AFB, New York.

13 May
A U.S. Navy instructor pilot was killed after two Navy Beechcraft T-34C Turbo Mentors collides over a densely wooded field 6 miles SW of NAS Whiting Field, Florida.

19 June
A U.S. Navy Sikorsky H-53 crashed into a river near Virginia Beach, Virginia, this date, apparently killing all seven aboard, authorities said. The helicopter crashed during a training flight, said Cmdr. Stephen Honda, a spokesman for the Navy's Atlantic Fleet air force. Meanwhile, two Army fliers were killed Friday when their Bell AH-1 Cobra helicopter crashed during a training exercise near Fort Irwin, California, an Army spokesman said.

13 July
McDonnell-Douglas F-15C Eagle 85-0116 of the 60th Fighter Squadron, 33rd Fighter Wing, based at Eglin AFB, Florida, crashed at 0900 hrs. in the Gulf of Mexico, 90 miles S of Eglin. The pilot, assigned to the 60th Fighter Squadron, ejected safely and was rescued. He and another F-15 had departed Eglin at 0835 hrs. for a training mission.

20 July
A Bell-Boeing MV-22 Osprey prototype, BuNo 163914, arriving from Eglin AFB, Florida, caught fire and fell into the Potomac River at MCAS Quantico, Virginia, USA, killing 5 crew members in front of an audience of high-ranking US government officials; this was the first of a series of fatal accidents involving the controversial tiltrotor aircraft.

22 July
Two soldiers from Fort Carson, Colorado, managed to avoid being killed when their U.S. Army McDonnell-Douglas AH-64 Apache crashed into the side of the north peak of 12,300 foot Almagre Mountain, known as "Mount Baldy", S of Pikes Peak. Chief Warrant Officers Douglas Mohr and David Reaves were on a routine training mission when their attack helicopter impacts several hundred feet below the crest in steep, rocky terrain. Fuel on the Apache ignited shortly after impact, burning a 30-square yard area but didn't spread because the area was mostly rock. How the crew escaped before the fire is unknown.

31 July
A US Navy Grumman E-2C Hawkeye of VAW-126 on a training flight crashed in the Atlantic Ocean ≈75 miles N of Puerto Rico while returning to the USS John F. Kennedy, killing all five crew. The Navy reported on 1 August that the aircraft radioed that it was in trouble before coming down ≈4 miles from the carrier, the second aircraft loss of that air wing in less than a fortnight.

4 August
A Lockheed F-117A Nighthawk, 85-801, "The Perpetrator", goes out of control after take off for a night training mission from Holloman AFB, New Mexico. The pilot from the 416th Fighter Squadron, ejects safely, suffering only minor cuts. The aircraft came down in sparsely populated area near a trailer park. Investigators believed that an improperly reinstalled bleed air duct led to control failure.

13 October
Antonov An-124 Ruslan, CCCP-82002, believed destined for Aeroflot, on test flight by Antonov/Aviastar, suffered nose cargo door failure during high-speed descent (part of test program) resulting in total loss of control. The Airframe came down in forested terrain near Kyiv, killing eight of nine crew members.

16 October
A U.S. Army McDonnell-Douglas AH-64 Apache of Company B, 1/151st Aviation Battalion, out of McEntire Air National Guard Base, crashed in a wooded area near Dacusville, South Carolina. Both crew sustained minor injuries.

19 October
A Panavia Tornado crashed in the evening on the Nellis AFB, Nevada range, 100 miles NE of Las Vegas, during Red Flag combat exercises, killing two crew from the Italian Air Force.

29 October
A United States Air Force Sikorsky MH-60G Pave Hawk crashed near Antelope Island, Utah, killing five US Army Rangers and seven Air Force Special Operations Airmen. Only the commanding pilot survived.

3 November
A United States Navy Grumman EA-6B Prowler crashed in field near NAS El Centro, California. The three crewmen ejected at a very low altitude while inverted, and all were killed. Crew included Lt. Charles Robert Gurley (USN), Lt. Peter Limoge (USMC), and Ltjg. Dave Roberts (USN).

30 November
On 29 November 1992, four Lockheed C-141 Starlifters, of the 62d Airlift Wing, deployed from McChord AFB, Washington, to Malmstrom AFB, Montana, to take part in what was supposed to be a routine local air refueling/airdrop mission, with a KC-135 Stratotanker of the 141st Air Refueling Wing, Washington Air National Guard, out of Fairchild AFB, Washington. Two Starlifters collided over Harlem, in north central Montana, at 2020 hrs., this date, while involved in a refueling training exercise at between 24,000 and 27,000 feet, killing all 13 aboard the two jets, said Mike O'Connor of the Federal Aviation Administration. C-141Bs 65-0255 and 66-0142 came down a mile apart. Wreckage was scattered over 16 square miles 12 miles north of Harlem, a town of 1,100 near the Canada–US border. There were six people on one of the aircraft and seven on the other. Eleven of the men were from the 36th Airlift Squadron, one from the 8th Airlift Squadron, and one from the 4th Airlift Squadron. Neither aircraft was carrying any cargo on the training mission, indications they had finished part of the refueling and one of the aircraft was moving back into formation when the collision occurred.

30 November
Rockwell B-1B Lancer, 86-0106, "Lone Wolf", of 337th Bomb Squadron, 96th Bomb Wing, flew into a mountain, 300 feet below a 6,500-foot ridge line approximately 36 miles SSW of Van Horn, Texas, when the pilot interrupted the terrain-following radar. 4 fatalities. The Air Force attributed the crash to pilot error. Aircraft had collided with a KC-135R over Nebraska on 24 Mar 1992, but was repaired.

1 December
Two USAF C-141Bs, 65-0255 and C-141B 66-0142, both stationed at McCord AFB, WA, collided over Montana and crashed while flying a nighttime air refueling mission. All 13 crew members died.

22 December
Mikoyan-Gurevich MiG-23UB collided at 3,500 feet with Libyan Arab Airlines Flight 1103, Boeing 727-2L5, registered 5A-DIA, near Tripoli, Libya; all 147 passengers and crew of 10 were killed, as well as the fighter's two crew members. Airliner was from Benghazi-Benina International Airport to Tripoli International Airport.

23 December
Grumman F-14 Tomcat Lieutenant Commander James Robert Segars of the United States Naval Reserve died tragically in the crash of his F-14 Tomcat jet fighter near Comanche, Texas.

== 1993 ==
24 February
A UH-60 Blackhawk helicopter approaching Wiesbaden Air Base crashed killing Maj. Gen. Jarrett J. Robertson, 52, of Springfield, Mo.; Col. William J. Densberger, 47, of Westwood, N.J.; Col. Robert J. Kelly, 48, of Boston, Mass., and Spec. Gary L. Rhodes Jr., 23, of Orange Park, Fla.

25 March
A US Navy Grumman E-2C Hawkeye, BuNo 161549 of VAW-124, crashed into the Ionian Sea off Crotone, southern Italy, shortly after being waved off from the USS Theodore Roosevelt due to a fouled deck. The aircraft had been monitoring nightly drops of humanitarian aid to Muslims in eastern Bosnia, and was returning to the carrier when it was sent into the holding pattern. The radar aircraft then disappeared about one mile from the ship without any radio call and no cause was determined for the loss. KWF were Lt. Cmdr. Jon A. Rystrom, Lt. William R. Dyer, Lt. Robert A. Forwalder, Lt. Patrick J. Ardaiz, and Lt. John A. Messier.

27 April

A Zambian Air Force de Havilland Canada DHC-5D Buffalo, AF-319, crashed shortly after take-off from Libreville, Gabon. One engine caught fire and failed; the tired pilot then shut down the wrong engine, causing a complete loss of power during the climb and leading to a crash 500 metres offshore. The aircraft was carrying the Zambia national football team to a 1994 FIFA World Cup qualifier against Senegal. All 30 on board, including 18 players, the coach, and team support staff, were killed.

19 May
Sikorsky VH-60N White Hawk, BuNo 163267, of HMX-1, MCAS Quantico, Virginia, crashed in Charles County, Maryland, ≈35 miles SW of Washington, D.C., during a routine inspection flight, killing four.

25 May
In an 1844 hrs. flight deck accident aboard USS Theodore Roosevelt, the undercarriage of a McDonnell-Douglas F/A-18 Hornet attempting a wave-off from the carrier due to still fouled deck, struck the vertical fin on Grumman A-6E Intruder, BuNo 164382, coded '500', shearing away a large portion of the empennage, as the A-6 was taxiing away from the arresting gear. The Hornet dropped its underwing tanks and safely recovered to the carrier.

20 July
Attempting a night landing aboard USS Abraham Lincoln, operating in the Eastern Indian Ocean, Grumman F-14A-90-GR Tomcat, BuNo 159843, 'NH 111', of VF-213, piloted by Lt. Matthew T. Claar "Planet", first bird in the recovery cycle, dropped below the approach slope just before reaching fantail and at 2104:33 hrs. suffered a massive ramp strike, with rear fuselage striking the deck and completely disintegrating aft of the wing in huge fireball and pitching airframe up on its nose and skidding along the port edge of the angle, leaving a trail of burning fuel in its wake. Both crew ejected in Martin-Baker seats, but only RIO Lt. Dean A. Fuller survived, with minor injuries, and was recovered by SAR helicopter. The other pilot, who sequenced out first, did so while the airframe was extremely nose-low, landed on deck and died on impact; immediate attempts to resuscitate him proved in vain. The LSO had repeatedly tried to wave him off, according to CPL Kevin R. Fox, Powerline, VMFA-314 Black Knights, whom the pilot landed right in front of. Through diligent efforts of crew, all fires were extinguished and a ready deck was available for further recoveries after 33 minutes. An award, a sword, is given to the outstanding Midshipman 1/C selected for Naval Aviation, chosen by the NROTC Staff at Villanova University in Lt. Claar's memory, where he was a 1986 graduate.

24 July
At 1517 hrs. two Mikoyan MiG-29s, 526 and 925 of the Russian Flight Research Institute took off for a demonstration at RIAT RAF Fairford 1993, but during the display collided in mid-air. Both pilots, Alexander Beschastonov and Sergey Tresvyatsk, ejected safely.

8 August
A Saab JAS 39 Gripen, 39–102, crashed on the central Stockholm island of Långholmen, near the Västerbron bridge, during a slow speed manoeuver during a display over the Stockholm Water Festival. Lars Rådeström, the same pilot as in the 1989 incident, ejected safely. Despite large crowds of onlookers, only one person on the ground was injured. A woman was hospitalized for three weeks for burns. This crash was, like the previous one, caused by a PIO.

10 August
A McDonnell-Douglas AV-8B Harrier II, BuNo 162955, of VMA-231, crashed on the runway at Marine Corps Air Station Cherry Point, North Carolina as the pilot was doing "touch and go" landings. The aircraft's flaps jammed when moisture got into the flap controller causing it to short out. The Marine pilot ejected before the aircraft hit the runway however his parachute trajectory descended him into the fireball, killing him.

8 Sept
Two Camp Pendleton Marines were killed in San Diego when their Bell AH-1 SuperCobra helicopter crashed at Montgomery Field, a civilian suburban airfield. Witnesses said the helicopter rotor broke off in the air before the craft smashed into the ground. This led to the Marine Corps grounding all SuperCobras after a series of recent helicopter crashes. Miller said flights involving the helicopter were suspended pending final analysis of two accidents that occurred within 24 hours, one at Montgomery Field in San Diego and the other at Twentynine Palms, Calif.

13 December
USAF Lockheed U-2R, 68-10339, Article 061, of the 9th SRW went out of control on take-off from Beale AFB, California, The experienced U-2 Instructor Pilot did not survive.

== 1994 ==
3 March
A Sikorsky UH-60 Blackhawk helicopter of the 15th Fighter Wing, Republic of Korea Air Force exploded above Yongin, Gyeonggi-do, killing all of the six personnel on board, including General Cho Kun-hae, then Chief of the Air Staff of South Korea.

23 March

A mid-air collision between a Lockheed C-130 Hercules and a General Dynamics F-16D Fighting Falcon caused a ground crash at Pope Air Force Base, North Carolina. The F-16 hit and destroyed a Lockheed C-141 Starlifter parked on the tarmac, and flaming wreckage careened into paratroopers preparing for a practice drop, killing 24 and injuring many more. The C-130 landed safely.

5 April
A U.S. Navy Grumman A-6 Intruder, based at NAS Alameda, crashed into the San Francisco Bay, California at 1200 hrs., close to the mid-span of the San Francisco–Oakland Bay Bridge, killing the two crew members, the Coast Guard stated.

14 April

Two U.S. Army Sikorsky UH-60 Blackhawk helicopters were mistakenly shot down by USAF McDonnell Douglas F-15 Eagle jets while patrolling the no-fly zone over Iraq, killing 26 personnel.

5 May
A 1st Fighter Squadron trainee pilot from Tyndall Air Force Base near Panama City, Florida, safely ejected from his McDonnell-Douglas F-15C Eagle of the 1st FS, 325th Fighter Wing, before it crashed into the Gulf of Mexico about 5 miles south of Port St. Joe, Florida. On a training mission, the pilot lost control due to G‑induced loss of consciousness; he was rescued from the gulf by an MH-53 Pave Low Helicopter from the Air Force Special Operations Command at Hurlburt Field.

18 May
Two Fairchild Republic A-10 Thunderbolt IIs from the Air National Guard's 111th Attack Wing collided above the bombing range at Fort Indiantown Gap. Both USAF pilot Lt. Col. Thomas A. Essig and ANG pilot Lt. Col. Terrence D. Hobbs ejected from their planes and survived with minor injuries.

2 June

A Royal Air Force Boeing Chinook HC.2 helicopter, ZD576, 'G', of Odiham Wing, crashed near Campbeltown, Scotland, killing 29 crew and passengers, including several top officials of the Royal Ulster Constabulary.

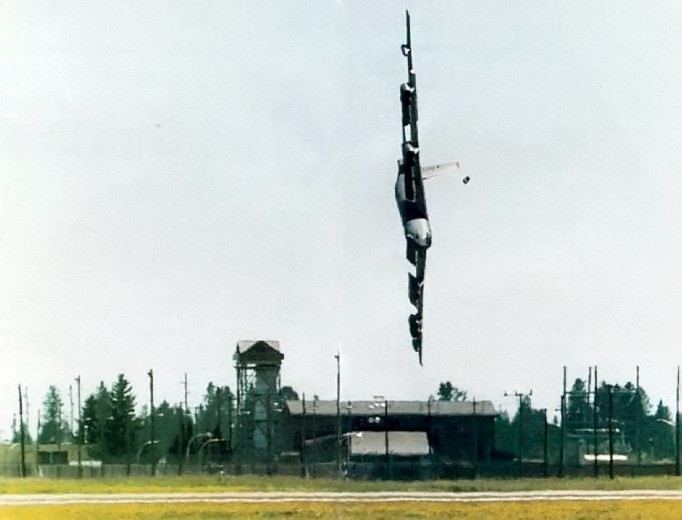
Boeing B-52H Stratofortress 61-0026 Czar 52 about to crash. Note that the co-pilot's hatch has been blown in a failed attempt to eject.

19 June
Royal Air Force BAe 146 CC.2 ZE700, operated by No. 32 Squadron RAF and flown by the Prince of Wales overran the runway at Islay Airport, Argyll and Bute. The aircraft had been landed downwind. There were no injuries amongst the eleven people on board although the aircraft suffered substantial damage when the nose gear collapsed. The aircraft was subsequently repaired and returned to service.

21 June
A USN McDonnell Douglas F/A-18 Hornet crashed at Southwest Border Romeo 2910 of the Pinecastle Electronic Warfare Range in the Ocala National Forest. The pilot ejected from the craft, was transported to the hospital, and reported in stable condition.

24 June

Czar 52, a USAF Boeing B-52H Stratofortress, 61-0026, crashed during an airshow practice at Fairchild AFB. After having rehearsed the maneuvers profile that in itself was dangerous to fly in a B-52, the aircraft came into land. Due to a KC-135 Stratotanker still being on the runway, the aircraft was required to make a 'go around'. After beginning a 180-degree turn left, the aircraft exceeded 90 degrees angle of bank, stalled and crashed into the ground. All four crew members were killed in the crash.

23 July
A U.S. Navy North American T-2C Buckeye, BuNo 157051, '0601', of VT-19, based at NAS Meridian, Mississippi, crashed at 1355 hrs. shortly after take-off from NAS Oceana, Virginia, impacting in a wooded area several hundred yards past the runway, with both crew ejecting before the crash. The student was injured but the instructor pilot died.

5 August
An Antonov An-12 crashed in Bada, Siberia, killing a total of 47, including 39 officers. Reported weather conditions included heavy rain and fog; initial responses from the Russian Air Force conflicted, with spokesman Gennady Lisenkov saying the plane missed the runway, while General Valery Tretyakov stated that the plane "touched a hill" before the crash.

17 August
A mid-air collision occurred between two U.S. Navy McDonnell Douglas T-45A Goshawks 163629 and 163639 60 miles southwest of NAS Kingsville, Texas. Pilot LTJG Brian S. DeHaan did not eject and was killed.

9 September
A Tupolev Tu-134 collided with a Tupolev Tu-22M. Five of the seven people aboard the Tu-134 passenger jet were killed while the Tu-22 bomber landed safely, with pieces of the jet attached to it.

22 September
Near Mayen in the Eifel a Royal Air Force Lynx helicopter crashed after its engine caught fire. On the same day a German Air Force F-4F suffered engine loss near Pferdsfeld because of fire but landed safely.

23 September
US Army Boeing CH-47D Chinook, 90-00220, of the 6–158th AVN, assigned for fire duty with the U.S. Forest Service, crashed at approximately 1750 hrs. on the Davis Ranch, 35 miles NE of McCall, Idaho, killing one of five on board. During a landing attempt in a clearing, the slope was misjudged, being ≈11 degrees rather than the anticipated 2–3 degrees. After the front gear touched down, power was reduced to lower the tail but the airframe rolled backward downslope until the front rotor made contact with the ground and then immediately impacted the fuselage, severing the driveshaft, flight control tubes and all electrical and hydraulic lines along the top of the cabin. The aft rotor, still under power, lifted the tail until the ship went over on its nose, the fuselage then rolling onto its starboard side. One Army crew member was killed, three others and a Forest Service passenger survived. The port engine continued to run for almost two hours after the accident, even though it was partially detached. Eventually a fuel valve was closed. The cause of the accident was determined to have been insufficient reconnaissance of the proposed landing-site compounded by the crew's inability to perceive the slope from their observation angle. The loss was estimated at $13,770,360. Written off with 4007 flight hours.

24 October
US Navy Grumman F-14A Tomcat, BuNo 160390, 'NH 103', of VF-213, crashed on approach to the carrier USS Abraham Lincoln, operating 40 miles (65 km.) off the Southern California coast, killing Lt. Kara Hultgreen, the first female Tomcat-qualified pilot in the Navy. The RIO, Lieutenant Matthew Klemish, initiated ejection as it became apparent that the flight envelope was being exceeded, his seat firing first. He was rescued. Due to low-speed rolling turn, the ejections were on the edge of the seat capabilities, and Hultgreen's, firing 0.4 seconds later, did not have time to fully sequence as the airframe had rolled past 90 degrees and she was ejected downward into the water, killing her instantly. Her body was recovered by a Navy salvage team on 12 November, still strapped into her seat, less than 100 yards (90 m.) from her F-14 on the seabed. The aircraft involved was used to shoot down a Libyan Air Force Su-22 Fitter during the 1981 Gulf of Sidra incident.

31 October
A Swiss Air Force Northrop F-5 Tiger was lost because a forgotten wrench, in the right landing gear, blocked the release mechanism and prevented landing the aircraft. The pilot was forced to pull out in 8500 feet over the Axalp shooting range. He pilot was unhurt.

5 December
A U.S. Navy pilot from Naval Air Station Pensacola, Florida, was killed when he lost control of his Beechcraft T-34C Turbo Mentor near Robertsdale, Alabama.

== 1995 ==
19 January
Rockwell-MBB X-31, BuNo 164584, first of two testbed airframes, crashes on 67th flight, north of Edwards AFB, California. German Federal Ministry of Defense test pilot Karl-Heinz Lang, assigned to the X-31 International Test Organization (ITO), ejects safely at 18,000 feet. He is taken to hospital for examination, a fire department spokesman said.

28 January
US Navy McDonnell Douglas F/A-18C Hornet, BuNo 164044, of VFA-22 crashed into the Pacific Ocean off the Southern California coast, after a night catapult launch from USS Abraham Lincoln, killing Lt. Glennon Kersgieter.

28 January
USMC McDonnell Douglas AV-8B Harrier II Plus, BuNo 164547, After taking off from USS Essex (LHD-2) USMC pilot Capt. Raymond N. McKay, 3rd Marine Aircraft Wing crashed into the Indian Ocean 140 miles off the coast of Somalia.

19 February
USMC Bell UH-1N Twin Huey, BuNo 159692, After lifting off the deck from USS Essex (LHD-2) the Huey crashed into the Indian Ocean 100 yards from the ship. The pilot was Capt Eric Douglas, with HMLA-267. He was struggling to free Sgt Justin A Harris, the crew chief, from his gun belt when the weight of the helicopter dragged Sgt Harris under water, drowning him.

22 February
Slingsby T-3A Firefly, 93-0555/N3092K of the 557th FTS, crashes when it fails to recover from a spin, killing instructor and student. Trainer made 17 tight spirals as it dropped one mile in 30 seconds before impacting ≈50 miles E of the Air Force Academy in Colorado. This was the first of three Firefly fatal accidents before the type was withdrawn from operation and the surviving airframes scrapped.

17 April
A USAF LearJet C-21, the U.S. military version of the LearJet 35A, crashed in a wooded area four miles south of Alexander City, Alabama, while trying to make an unplanned landing at the airport. The aircraft was en route to Randolph Air Force Base, Texas, from Andrews Air Force Base, Maryland. An Air Force spokesman said that the aircraft carried a crew of two and six passengers. One of the eight killed in the crash was Clark G. Fiester, Assistant Secretary of the Air Force; Maj. Gen. Glenn A. Profitt II, director of plans and operations for the Air Education and Training Command.

27 April
While performing ACM near the Hawaiian Islands, the starboard engine of a USN Grumman F-14A Tomcat, BuNo 161273, coded 'NH 116', of VF-213 from the USS Abraham Lincoln, suffers catastrophic compressor stall, severing hydraulic and fuel lines. Pilot Lt. Cdr. John Stacy Bates and RIO Lt. M. Crawford successfully eject and are rescued by a helicopter of HS-6.

10 May
A USAF Lockheed F-117A Nighthawk, 85-0822, callsign Spear 26, from the 49th Fighter Wing, Holloman AFB, New Mexico, crashes 7 miles S of Zuni, New Mexico, while on a training mission. The pilot, Capt. Kenneth W. Levens, 35, of the 9th Fighter Squadron, was killed in the crash. The autopilot apparently disengaged, aircraft enters inverted near-vertical dive, impacts in a 70 degree dive with 120 degrees starboard bank at more than 600 mph at 2225 hrs, creating a 30 foot crater. A Kirtland AFB H-60 Blackhawk finds the impact site shortly after 0000 hrs.

16 May

A Royal Air Force Hawker Siddeley Nimrod R1, XW666, ditched in the Moray Firth in Scotland as a result of an in-flight engine fire; all seven crew survived.

21 May-22 May

Historic Boeing B-29 Superfortress, 45-21768, "Kee Bird", of the 46th/72d Reconnaissance Squadrons, abandoned in 1947 and recently restored to flying condition after a number of highly calamitous setbacks, is severely damaged by fire while attempting to take off from a frozen lakebed in Greenland. Its remains are abandoned to sink into the melting ice.

30 May
A USAF McDonnell-Douglas F-15C Eagle, 79-0068, of the 53d Fighter Squadron, 52d Fighter Wing, Spangdahlem Air Base, Germany, crashes on take-off killing pilot who dies en route to hospital. Cause was cross-connected control rods for the flaps. The USAF despite awareness of poorly coordinated color scheme for keeping the rods from being misconnected (identical cases in 1986 and 1991, which, fortunately, were detected before leading to accidents), subjects two mechanics to courts martial for criminally negligent homicide, punishable by four years in prison, a dishonorable discharge and forfeiture of all pay and allowances. The Air Force also engages in dirty tricks, intercepting the defendants' mail and holding it when they were contacted by a safety expert who wanted to assist them. One defendant committed suicide on 3 October 1995, the date the court martial was due to begin. On 13 November, the service, citing "justice and the interests of the Air Force", dropped its case against the other mechanic, in exchange for his decision to leave the military. Motivation for the scape-goating attempt by the service can be traced to criticism the 52d Fighter Wing received for not bringing up on charges pilots who were responsible for downing two U.S. Army helicopters over Iraq in 1994, killing 26. "The 53rd FS 'Tigers' never fully recovered from the dark blemish on their otherwise exemplary record. The only way the USAF could make the issue and the pain go away was by closing the unit. This was done on March 10, 1999, leaving USAFE with only one Eagle squadron for the next war in its theater."

29 August
Lockheed U-2R, 68-10338, Article 060, of the 9th Reconnaissance Wing flying under call sign Mooch 31, with sensor pod on pylon above spine, departs RAF Fairford at 0727 hrs. for intended Bosnian overflight Senior Span mission, but port underwing pogo fails to detach. Pilot returns to airfield runway 27, attempts to shake loose the outrigger. Just after passing the runway's midpoint the aircraft enters a stall during which the left wing drops, hits the runway, breaking off the wingtip. The aircraft veers left towards the grass, strikes a power sub-station and crashes through the base's perimeter fence. As the aircraft bounces on a concrete taxiway pilot attempts ejection, but zero-zero seat is outside of parameters, pilot chute deploys but main canopy does not have time to fully inflate. Pilot comes to rest 150 feet E of airframe, which ends up in farmer's field. Nose breaks off, rest of U-2 fully engulfed in fire. Pilot is transported to Princess Margaret Hospital in Swindon by police helicopter where he dies at 0955 hrs. He is interred at Arlington National Cemetery.

2 September

A Royal Air Force Hawker Siddeley Nimrod MR.2P, XV239, stalls during low altitude turn, crashes into Lake Ontario, at Toronto, Canada, during the 46th Canadian National Exhibition International Air Show, killing all seven crew of 120 Squadron. Video of this crash is widely available on the internet.

20 September
Just after making a supersonic pass close by the starboard side of the USS John Paul Jones, Grumman F-14A Tomcat, BuNo 161146, 'NH 112', of VF-213 from the USS Abraham Lincoln, explodes in flight from catastrophic compressor failure, both crew ejecting, suffering burns to the upper body. Crew recovered. Aircraft goes down in the Central Pacific, about 800 miles W of Guam, and 55 miles from the carrier.

22 September

A USAF Boeing E-3B Sentry 77-0354 callsign Yukla 27, of the 962nd Airborne Air Control Squadron, 552d Air Control Wing, crashes shortly after take off from Elmendorf AFB, Alaska, when a flock of Canadian snow geese were ingested by its engines. All 24 crew members die, including 2 Canadian air crew members. This was the first loss of an E-3 since the type entered service in 1977.

22 November
A Japanese Air Self Defense Force Mitsubishi F-15J, 02-8919, of the 308 Hiko-tai is accidentally shot down by an AIM-9L Sidewinder fired by another JASDF F-15 during air-to-air combat training. The pilot ejects and is picked up safe.

== 1996 ==
29 January
A Grumman F-14A Tomcat, BuNo 162599, of VF-213, crashes on take-off from Nashville International Airport, Nashville, Tennessee, killing both crew and three people on ground as fireball engulfs three houses. The U.S. Navy determines that the accident was the result of pilot error, when pilot Lt. Cmdr. John Bates, attempted a high speed, steep-angle take-off, the review board announces in April 1996. Pilot loses spatial orientation in overcast, suffers vertigo. Bates had previously been involved in an F-14 accident in April 1995.

2 February
A Grumman F-14A Tomcat crashes in the northern Persian Gulf. The U.S. Navy announces a three-day stand down for F-14 operations. The safety standdown will allow the service "to assess all aspects of operations and procedures", a Navy spokeswoman said. She said the review will "assess available information to determine if any procedural or other modifications to F-14 operations are warranted."
8 February
A Northrop F-5 Tiger assigned to VFC-13, Fallon NAS, Nevada, crashed in the Clan Alpine Mountains at the north end of Edwards Creek Valley. The pilot, LCDR Richard T. Ryon ejected from the F-5N and did not survive.

16 February
A Marine Corps AV8B Harrier crashed shortly after takeoff when it was struck by lightning seconds after it lifted off the runway at Cherry Point, North Carolina. The lightning strike hit one of the fuel cells on the Harrier that caused a fire. The fire spread to the wing where it caused the composite wing to delaminate, resulting in the loss of lift and control. The pilot Captain Ron Walkerwicz was killed upon impact with the ground.

18 February
A Grumman F-14A Tomcat, converted to Grumman F-14D(R), BuNo 161158, of VF-11, suffers engine failure, disintegration of airframe, crashes into the Pacific Ocean at ≈1230 hrs., ≈120 miles off the coast of southern California during routine flight exercises, killing two crew. The fighter was part of a squadron that was taking part in a two-week operation with the USS Carl Vinson, said Doug Sayers, spokesman for NAS Miramar, California. Kenneth Bacon, chief spokesman for Secretary of Defense William Perry, said Perry met Tuesday, 20 February, with Adm. Mike Boorda, the chief of naval operations, to hear how the Navy is approaching its investigation of the latest crash, the Associated Press reported on 21 February. The Navy sees no accident pattern in two fatal crashes of F-14 fighter jets in the past month that would call for special safety measures, officials said Tuesday. The pilot was Lt. Terence Lee Clark, 27, of Hemet, California.

9 March
A Marine Corps McDonnell-Douglas F-18 Hornet went down off Charleston, South Carolina, with two pilots aboard. The search for the Marine pilots was called off 10 March.

15 March
A Cecil Field Naval Air Station Lockheed S-3 Viking crashed shortly after take-off near Puerto Rico. Navy officials called off the search for the two pilots on 16 March.
17 March
A Navy pilot safely ejected from his McDonnell-Douglas T-45A Goshawk, training jet, BuNo 163645, 'B 245', of TW-2, during an emergency landing at Cecil Field Naval Air Station, Jacksonville, Florida. The pilot, who was not injured, notified officials that two tires on the jet had blown out during take-off from the aircraft carrier USS John F. Kennedy, off Jacksonville. According to officials he had planned to land the aircraft at Cecil Field without the wheels, but ejected after the jet first made contact with the runway. After he ejected, the aircraft flipped over. The pilot was assigned to Training Squadron 22, of Kingsville, Texas. The squadron was doing routine training flights off the carrier and onto land.

3 April

A USAF Boeing CT-43 73-1149, call sign IFO 21, of the 76th Airlift Squadron, 86th Airlift Wing, Ramstein Air Base, Germany, on an official trade mission, crashed on approach to Dubrovnik Airport, Croatia, killing United States Secretary of Commerce Ron Brown and 34 other people. The crash board findings, announced 7 June 1996, blamed the crash on a failure of command, aircrew error and an improperly designed instrument approach procedure.

17 April
A Grumman F-14B Tomcat BuNo 161444, coded 'AD 201', of VF-101, based at NAS Oceana, Virginia Beach, Virginia, crashes near Norfolk, Virginia, the fourth accident for the type this year. The two crew survive.

22 April
The prototype Lockheed Martin RQ-3 DarkStar crashes shortly after take off on its second flight due to incorrect aerodynamic modeling of the vehicle's flight control laws.

28 April
A Panavia Tornado IDS, tactical number 43+83 of the GAF was severely damaged during low level flight exercise at CFB Goose Bay, Canada.

10 May
A CH-46E Sea Knight and an AH-1W Cobra assault helicopter collided mid-air during a training exercise in Camp Lejeune, North Carolina, killing 14 Marines with the two pilots of the CH-46E surviving.

18 May
A Grumman F-14A Tomcat BuNo 161282, coded 'NF 101', of VF-154 crashes into the Pacific Ocean 500 miles W of Guam after suffering engine malfunction. Both crew eject safely.

12 June
Two Australian Army Aviation Sikorsky S-70A Black Hawk helicopters, A25-113 and A25-209 collide during a night training exercise near Townsville, Queensland, killing 18 soldiers. One source lists fatalities as 19.

19 June
A Department of the Navy F/A-18C operated by McDonnell-Douglas Aerospace from the St. Louis Regional Airport crashed into terrain while executing a reverse half Cuban eight manoevre in preparation for a Czech airshow, killing pilot Jeffrey James Crutchfield, a Navy veteran and McDonnell employee.

27 June
An Air National Guard General Dynamics F-16C Fighting Falcon makes a dead-stick landing at Elizabeth City Air Station following an engine failure. Capt Chris H. Rose of 121st Fighter Squadron was returning from a training mission when his engine suffered a flameout at 13,000 feet, but he was able to jettison his fuel tanks and glide for 15 miles to a successful landing with the assistance of his three wingmen and air traffic controllers. For his outstanding airmanship he was awarded the Koren Kolligian Jr Trophy.

4 July
A Swiss Air Force formation of three Northrop F-5 Tigers were returning to base as the leader rolled his fighter on its back for a visual check under the formation. Because a modification to the ejection seat locking lever that limited the pull weight to only 4 to 16 pounds, it was sufficient that the own weight of the lever, combined with a slow negative G-load, initiated the ejection sequence during the inverted flight. The aircraft crashed near a playground in Schänis. The pilot was injured. Afterward all the seats of the Tiger fleet were modified.

11 July
A General Dynamics F-16C Fighting Falcon, 91-0354, of the 77th Fighter Squadron, being relocated from Shaw AFB, South Carolina, to Eglin AFB, Florida, to avoid Hurricane Bertha, crashes at ≈1530 hrs. into a neighborhood 20 miles N of Pensacola, Florida, following an engine failure, striking two homes and killing a four-year-old boy. A man and woman in the house suffered burns. The pilot was forced to eject two miles short of the runway. The pilot was uninjured. The accident investigation showed foreign object damage to a fan blade caused a crack seven thousands of an inch (too small to visually spot). The blade was ingested into the engine. The engine had failed three times during the flight with two relights. With the third engine failure the pilot ditched the aircraft into what he hoped was an unpopulated area, and ejected at only 200 feet.

14 July
NATO Boeing E-3B Sentry AWACS LX-N90457 overruns runway into sea on take-off from Preveza AFB, Preveza, Greece. Fuselage breaks in two, but no casualties among crew of 16. Aircraft had rolled out at Boeing Renton, Washington plant on 21 April 1984, first flown 5 June 1984. Delivered to NATO on 19 December 1984 after AEW suite fitted out by Dornier.

15 July
At approximately 1803 hrs., a Belgian Lockheed C-130H Hercules, CH-06 at Eindhoven Air Base in the Netherlands after bird strikes stopped three engines. A total of 34 people lost their lives as a result of the accident, and seven people were seriously injured.

17 August
A Lockheed C-130 Hercules collided with Sheep Mountain after loading a vehicle used by White House security. A spokesperson stated the pilot had started to return to Jackson Hole Airport before the crash at 10:30 PM MDT. All nine people on board, eight military personnel and one Secret Service agent, died in the crash.

22 August
A USMC McDonnell Douglas F/A-18 Hornet crashed into the Atlantic Ocean off the coast of Ocean City, Maryland.

22 August
An Air National Guard A-10 on a maintenance test flight crashed between Fishing Bay, Maryland and the Wicomico River.

23 August
A USMC Grumman EA-6B Prowler crashed in the Barry M. Goldwater Air Force Range, east of the air station in Yuma, Arizona.

24 August
Two Panavia Tornados of the Luftwaffe crashed during low-level training exercises 80 miles west of CFB Goose Bay killing one pilot.

16 September
A Eurocopter HH-65 Dolphin helicopter (tail number 905) crashed into the Mediterranean Sea, approximately 12 miles (19 kilometers) off the coast of Nahariya, Israel. The crash occurred during a joint night training exercise with two Israeli Navy missile ships. All three crew members from Squadron 193 aboard were killed.

30 September
Air Force Academy Slingsby T-3A Firefly crashes 30 miles E of Colorado Springs, Colorado when the crew, who had been practicing a forced landing, suffer engine failure during the key part of the manoeuvre, the instructor and student both killed.

23 October
Fuerza Aérea Argentina Boeing 707-372C, LV-LGP, on approach to Ezeiza-Ministro Pistarini Airport, Buenos Aires, Argentina, makes high approach without proper attention to pre-landing procedures, develops nose-down attitude at ≈900–1,000 metres, does not have time to correct, strikes ground hard ≈750 metres short of runway 11, breaks up, burns. Two of eight on board are killed.

1 November 1996
A U.S. Navy McDonnell-Douglas T-45A Goshawk crashes on final approach to NAS Kingsville during Night Familiarization flight due to birdstrike causing low altitude catastrophic engine failure. Both Instructor and student ejected safely. The mishap investigation revealed multiple canvasback duck DNA remains in the burner section of the angle-engine aircraft.

2 December
A U.S. Navy Beechcraft T-34C Turbo Mentor crashes at Maxwell Air Force Base in Montgomery, Alabama, killing the instructor and his student navigator from Italy. The pair, flying out of NAS Pensacola, Florida, were practicing manoeuvers.

== 1997 ==
9 January
Royal Air Force BAE Systems Harrier GR.7, ZD377, crashed at Laarbruch, ending up inverted on runway, burned.

10 January
USAF McDonnell-Douglas F-15C Eagle 85-0099 of the 58th TFS, 33d TFW, based at Eglin AFB, catches fire on take-off from Eglin. Pilot returns for an immediate landing and egresses safely on the ground. Aircraft completely destroyed by fire. This aircraft credited with MiG-25 kill by AIM-7M on 19 January 1991 during Operation Desert Storm while flown by Capt. Lawrence E. Pitta.

4 February

Two Israeli Sikorsky CH-53 Sea Stallions, 357 and 903 collide in darkness near the remote She'ar Yeshuv kibbutz, over northern Israel at ≈1900 hrs. in a storm, killing 73 Israel Defense Forces soldiers. Three crew and 34 passengers on 357, three crew and 33 passengers on 903.

4 February
A USAF General Dynamics F-16D Fighting Falcon, 87–385, of the 466th Fighter Squadron, crashed about ten miles northeast of Wendover, Utah, near the Utah-Nevada state line after suffering engine flame-out. The crew was from the 419th Fighter Wing at Hill Air Force Base, Utah. A Hurlburt Field crew flying an MC-130E Combat Talon I on a mountain terrain exercise were diverted to help search for the jet's crew. After refueling in mid-air, the Hurlburt crew found the two flyers and sent up flares to pinpoint their location for search helicopters. Major Edward G. Goggins was the pilot and Captain Mark C. Snyder a passenger flight surgeon. One suffered a broken ankle and the other had burns.

An F/A-18C crashes 16 March

16 March
An F/A-18C crashes aboard the USS John F. Kennedy off the coast of North Carolina, injuring eight crewmen.

20 March
A Swiss Air Force Dassault Mirage IIIRS crashed near Sainte-Croix, Switzerland by bad weather conditions. It was the first loss of a Reconnaissance Mirage since the introduction in the 60'. The pilot died in the crash.

2 April
Craig D. Button (November 24, 1964—April 2, 1997), a United States Air Force pilot, dies when he mysteriously crashes a Fairchild-Republic A-10 Thunderbolt II aircraft in the Colorado Rockies. Before the incident, Captain Button inexplicably flew hundreds of miles off-course without radio contact, appeared to maneuver purposefully and did not attempt to eject before the crash. His death is regarded as a suicide because no other theory explains the events. His aircraft carried live bombs, which were never recovered. It took three weeks to find the crashsite. During that time, there was widespread public speculation about Captain Button's intentions and whereabouts.

25 June
Third USAF Air Force Academy Slingsby T-3A Firefly crash in 28 months kills student and instructor when the engine fails during a turn at ≈500 feet altitude, aircraft enters spin and explodes on impact, two miles E of the Colorado Springs academy airfield. "Their aircraft had been written up by pilots 10 times for engine problems, including one during the flight immediately before the fatal trip. The Air Force said the engine was running at impact, although it was producing so little power that the propeller was barely turning." Although the Academy continues to fly the type, another incident in which the T-3 engine quits in-flight, forcing a dead-stick landing at the airfield, finally leads to USAF to ground the design on 25 July 1997, with the whole fleet eventually scrapped.

8 July
A Sikorsky UH-60L Black Hawk helicopter of the 82nd Airborne Division operating out of Fort Bragg crashed in a remote wooded area about 20 miles southwest of Fayetteville, North Carolina during a routine training mission, killing all eight aboard. An Army investigation concluded the cause was pilot error. A rotor blade hit a 60-foot-tall pine tree during a sharp, banking turn witnesses described as between 75 degrees and 85 degrees. The 28-year-old pilot was involved in a blade strike just two months earlier, and there were reports of his tendency to fly fast, unusually low (below the tree line in the May incident), close to obstacles, and to bank excessively during turns; although one pilot who flew with him reported that he had a "good, sound reputation", and a Forestry Service pilot who observed the Black Hawk just prior to the crash reported that it was banking normally about 200 feet above the trees.

22 August
The crew of a USAF General Dynamics F-16B Fighting Falcon, 82-1037, of the 39th Flight Test Squadron at Eglin Air Force Base, "ET" tailcode, ejected over the Gulf of Mexico after their jet suffered separation of engine fourth stage at speeds past Mach, about seven miles south of Destin, Florida. The airmen were rescued by the crew and passengers of Top Gun, a charter fishing boat out of Destin, who saw the crash. The airmen were members of the Eglin's Development Test Center's 39th Flight Test Squadron. The aircraft was returning to Eglin after flying as a chase aircraft in a mission with an Air Force McDonnell Douglas F-15 Eagle. Divers located the jet in 70 feet of water a week following the accident. A barge carried the wreckage to a hangar at Eglin where investigators hoped to find clues as to what caused the crash.

13 September

German Air Force Tupolev Tu-154M, 11+02, call sign GAF 074, of 1 Staffel/FBS (Flugbereitschaft), used for Open Skies treaty verification, collided with a USAF Lockheed C-141B Starlifter, 65-9405, call sign REACH 4201, of the 305th AMW, about 120 km (75 mi) W of the coast of Namibia over the Atlantic Ocean, killing all 24 aboard the Tu-154 and all nine on the C-141. Accident investigations by both countries, released 31 March 1998, found that the Tu-154 was flying at the wrong altitude, 35,000 feet (11,600 m.) instead of 39,000 feet (12,900 m.), and was thus primarily at fault. Contributory factor was chronically poor ATC in the area.

14 September
A USAF Lockheed F-117 Nighthawk, 81-793, of the 7th Fighter Squadron, 49th Fighter Wing, at Holloman AFB, New Mexico, lost its port wing at 1500 hrs. during a pass over Martin State Airport, Middle River, Maryland during the Chesapeake Air Show and crashed into a residential area of Bowley's Quarters, Maryland damaging several homes. Four people on the ground received minor injuries and the pilot, Maj. Bryan "B.K." Knight, 36, escaped with minor injuries after ejecting from the aircraft. A month-long Air Force investigation found that four of 39 fasteners for the wing's structural support assembly were apparently left off when the wings were removed and reinstalled in January 1996, according to a report released 12 December 1997.

23 September
Static test Boeing F/A-18E Super Hornet airframe, ST56, being barricade tested at NAES Lakehurst, New Jersey by being powered down a 1.5-mile (2.4 km) track by a Pratt & Whitney J57-powered jet car, flips over and crashes into nearby woods when the steel cable linking the barrier with underground hydraulic engines fails.

23 September
A USN EP-3 Aries II (electronic warfare P-3C Orion variant, BuNo 157320) crashed in the early morning hours while landing at Souda Bay airfield near Chania, Greece. No fatalities. 24 crew members sustained minor injuries after the aircraft landed at high speed, drifted to the right, clipped side runway lights before making strong corrections towards centerline, and finally overran the runway. The nose was ground off and the left outboard ("Number 1") engine caught fire. Aircraft written off, airframe airlifted using C-5B to Raytheon in Waco, Texas.}

2 October
A USN Grumman F-14A Tomcat, BuNo 161425, converted to F-14A+, later redesignated F-14B, of VF-101, based at NAS Oceana, Virginia Beach, Virginia, crashes into the Atlantic Ocean off the North Carolina coast Thursday afternoon, moments after the two crew eject. "A Coast Guard helicopter later plucked the Tomcat's radar intercept officer from 4- to 5-foot seas, but rescuers were still searching for the jet's pilot after nightfall. The Navy declined to identify either of the crewmen...until their families were notified. The radar intercept officer was undergoing a medical examination at Oceana Thursday night, and was reportedly in good condition." The U.S. Navy suspends search for the missing aviator on 5 October. The cause of the crash was not known, the Navy said in a statement. A failure of left horizontal stab linkage—while the trailing edge was down—threw the aircraft into violent right-hand rolls. When the pilot put in corrective stick, the aircraft would pitch down violently due to a stuck left-hand horizontal stab. This flight condition was unrecoverable. The RIO pulled the ejection handle at 7000 feet. The mishap pilot died when his ejection seat failed.

3 October
A Pakistan Air Force F-7P Skybolt crashes at bhakkar after suffering a bird strike. The pilot safely ejected.
12 November
A Swiss Air Force PC-6 crashes on the Simmental in cause of bad weather conditions. One pilot and four soldiers dies in the crash.

21 November
A Pakistani Shenyang F-6C Farmer crashed at Saranan some clicks away from Samungli Air Base. The pilot Flight lieutenant Zarrar Rahman Niazi was KIA after his Martin-Baker ejection seat's parachute failed to deploy.

5 December
Russian Air Force Antonov An-124 Ruslan, RA-82005, delivering two Sukhoi Su-27 Flankers to Vietnam, loses both port engines at 200 feet (60 m) on take-off from Irkutsk, crashing into residential area, killing eight crew, 15 passengers, and 45 on the ground (some accounts list higher ground casualties). Cause was thought to be either contaminated fuel or wrong grade of fuel, taken on at Irkutsk.

== 1998 ==
3 February

A U.S. Marine Corps Grumman EA-6B Prowler, BuNo 163045, coded 'CY-02', callsign Easy 01, of VMAQ-2, struck a cable supporting a gondola in Cavalese. The cable was severed and 20 people in the cabin plunged over 80 metres to their deaths. The aircraft had wing and tail damage but was able to return to the base.

3 February
A German Panavia Tornado, coded 4482, creshed near Lippstadt. Both crew members saved themselves with the ejection seat.

6 February
Two F/A-18C Hornets of VMFA-251 that launched from the USS George Washington (CVN-73) collided mid-air 80 miles east of Kuwait City killing one pilot.

12 February

A Sudan Air Force Antonov An-26 overshoots the runway in heavy fog and crashes into a river at Nasir, South Sudan killing 26 of the 57 people on board, including Sudan's vice president and other civilian government officials.

29 March
A Peruvian Air Force Antonov An-32, FAP-388/OB-1388, carrying villagers affected by floods, crashes in Piura, Peru after engine failure. Of the 55 people on board, 22 are killed.

8 April
A Swiss Air Force McDonnell-Douglas F/A-18 Hornet crashes near Crans-Montana during bad weather conditions, Switzerland.

5 May
A Peruvian Air Force Boeing 737-200 FAP-351 crashes at ≈2130 hrs. during poor weather near Andoas, Peru killing 75 of the 88 people on board.

25 May
A Lao People's Liberation Army Air Force Yakovlev Yak-40, RDPL-34001, '001', crashes into a mountain during heavy rain killing all of the 26 on board, including Lt. Gen. Dao Trong Lich, Chief of the General Staff of the Vietnamese People's Army.

11 June
A USN instructor and his student pilot from NAS Whiting Field are killed near Key Largo, Florida, when their Beechcraft T-34C Turbo Mentor hits another training aircraft in mid-air and crashes into 2 feet of water.

17 June
Kamov Ka-50, Hokum, crash at Army Aviation Combat Training Centre, Torzhok, kills Gen. Boris Vorobyov.

1 July
A MK.51 BAE Hawk HW-324 of the Finnish Air Force crashes into the forest near Luopioinen due to Engine failure. Both pilots ejected. One of the pilots sustained minor injuries.

8 August
A Grumman F-14A Tomcat, BuNo 160407, coded 'AC 105', of VF-32, based at NAS Oceana, Virginia Beach, Virginia, crashes into the Atlantic Ocean, while on a routine training mission. Both crewmen eject and are rescued within 15 minutes, Navy officials in Norfolk, Virginia said. The F-14 was operating from the USS Enterprise.

3 September
Twelve USAF airmen are killed when two HH-60G Pavehawk helicopters, 88-26105 and 91-26359, call signs Jolly 38 and Jolly 39, assigned to the 66th Rescue Squadron at Nellis Air Force Base, Nevada, are involved in a mid-air collision over the Nevada Test and Training Range during a routine night training exercise. An investigation by the Air Force Accident Investigation Board concluded that at least three of the crew did not have the necessary training for the flight, and that the group commander at Nellis was aware of training and morale problems prior to the accident, yet failed to report them to the wing commander.

14 October
Two Swiss Air Force PC-9 collided during a target towing exercise near Oberuzwil. One pilot ejected and was flown immediately to the hospital, but succumbed to his injuries during the morning. The other pilot managed to land the damaged aircraft at a airfield in Altenrhein.

8 November
Lockheed S-3B Viking, BuNo 159733, of VS-22 lands on the deck of the USS Enterprise at 1918 hrs. during night landing requalifications off of the Virginia coast. At 1920 hrs. an EA-6B Prowler, BuNo 163885, of VAQ-130 receives a wave-off due to the deck still being fouled, but its starboard wing strikes the Viking. The Prowler continues over the side as all four crew eject, as well as two crew from the S-3. The Viking crew are recovered, but the Prowler crew are all casualties with only one body recovered. Deck fire is brought under control in seven minutes. The damaged S-3B is also jettisoned.

== 1999 ==
13 January
A Washington Air National Guard Boeing KC-135E Stratotanker 59-1452, call sign ESSO 77, crashes short of the runway at Geilenkirchen Air Base, Germany, killing the pilot, Maj. David Fite; co-pilot Capt. Kenneth Thiele; navigator Maj. Matthew Laiho; and Tech. Sgt. Richard Visintainer, the aircraft's boom operator. The aircraft was assigned to the 141st Air Refueling Wing, Fairchild AFB, Washington

21 January
A Nicaraguan Air Force Antonov An-26 126, crashes into a mountain near Bluefields, Nicaragua, killing all 28 on board.

21 January
Royal Air Force Panavia Tornado GR.1 ZA330, 'coded B-08', crashed into a Cessna 152 II, G-BPZX near Mattersey, Nottinghamshire. In the Air Accident Report 3/2000 the conclusion was none of the pilots saw each other in time to take avoiding action. Both crew of the Tornado as well as the pilot and passenger in the Cessna, were killed.

28 January
A USAF McDonnell-Douglas F-15C Eagle, 82-0020, of the 85th Test and Evaluation Squadron, 53rd Wing has mid-air collision at 35,000 feet over the Gulf of Mexico with another McDonnell Douglas F-15C Eagle 84-0011, of the 85th Test and Evaluation Squadron, 53rd Wing, 80 miles S of Eglin over Eglin water range during a 2 versus 3 Dissimilar Air Combat Training (DACT). Both pilots eject, pilot of 82–0020 slightly injured. Pilots rescued after 45 minutes in the water by a MH-53, call sign COWBOY 22, on instrument check-flight out of Hurlburt Field.

7 March
An Indian Air Force Antonov An-32 crashes upon landing in New Delhi, India during poor weather. All 19 people on board are killed.

27 March

A USAF Lockheed F-117A Nighthawk, 82-0806, on a bombing mission over Serbia, was shot down by the Federal Republic of Yugoslavia unit using a SA-3 Goa. The pilot ejected and the F-117A crashed in hostile territory.

7 April
A Boeing KC-135R Stratotanker, 57-1418, of the 153rd Air Refueling Squadron, Mississippi Air National Guard, is written off while undergoing maintenance at the Oklahoma ALC, Tinker AFB, Oklahoma, when the cabin is over-pressurized during a test and ruptures, tearing a 35 foot (10.6 m) hole in the aft fuselage, allowing tail section to drop to the ground.

18 April
Royal Australian Air Force General Dynamics F-111G, A8-291, of 6 Squadron crashes about 2230 hrs. while on exercises in Malaysia. Believed to have hit one of two peaks on small island Pulua Aur, off the east coast of the Malay Peninsula, and then crashed into the South China Sea. The two crew, Sqn. Ldr. Steve Hobbs and Flt. Lt. Anthony Short, are killed.

22 April
A Russian Air Force Sukhoi Su-24MR Fencer disappears from radar at 1140 hrs. while descending through cloud during a coastal surveillance flight. Wreckage found ≈9 miles (15 km) from Novorossiysk and 25 miles (40 km) from Anapa. Both crew did not eject and are killed.

2 May
The same day an American F-16 was shot down near Šabac and an A-10 Thunderbolt II was heavily damaged, operation control lost contact of an UAV in the Adriatic Sea, close to the coast and minutes from landing. Local fishermen witnesses give credit to the rumors this was a covered Dassault Mirage F1B (codename yogsothoth) damaged in dogfight over Beograd. Reports of airplane discharging something at sea were collected by coast guard, as well as the bail out of two pilots. Following the accident, never credited by the air force, it was confirmed that jet fighters were dropping unused weapons into the sea before landing.

27 May
An Indian Air Force HAL Mikoyan-Gurevich MiG-27L of 9 Wolfpack Sqn. suffers flame-out, fails to get relight, over Muntho Dhalo, Kargil, India during Kargil conflict. The MiG-27 pilot, Flt Lt K. Nachiketa successfully ejected at 1045 hrs., and he was captured by Pakistani ground forces as a POW. Pakistan claimed it as a shoot-down.

27 May
An Indian Air Force Mikoyan-Gurevich MiG-21MF, C-1539, of 17 Golden Arrows Sqn., is shot down by a Pakistani FIM-92 Stinger while searching for downed MiG-27 pilot during the Kargil conflict. Aircraft comes down at 1105 hrs., some 7.5 miles (12 km.) inside Pakistani-Administered Azad Kashmir. Although pilot Squadron Leader Ajay Ahuja ejected safely, Pakistan claimed he had been killed. After his body was returned 28 May, "initial examination found bullet wounds, which suggested he had been shot after ejecting. This was the first time since 1971 that India had lost an aircraft to hostile fire."

28 May
An Indian Air Force Mil Mi-17 helicopter is shot down by Pakistan air defence units using an FIM-92 Stinger missile during the Kargil conflict. Four IAF personnel were killed.

11 June
A Royal Air Force Lockheed C-130 Hercules veered off an airstrip in Kukës, Albania, after hitting a fence and several ground obstacles. The 15 people on board evacuated safely, however the aircraft was destroyed after fuel leakage from a damaged wing ignited. The cause of this accident was insufficient distance from the starting point of the take-off for the aircraft to get airborne safely.

12 June
Russian Air Force Sukhoi Su-30MK-1 demonstrator '01' with vectored thrust crashes on opening day of the Paris Air Show at Le Bourget Airport. At the completion of a downward spiralling maneuver, the tail contacted the grass surface. With almost no forward speed the fighter was able to pull away from the ground, wings level, with an up pitch of 10–15 degrees and climb to ≈150 feet (46 m), with the right jet nozzle deflected fully up and flames engulfing the left engine. Sukhoi test pilot Vyacheslav Averynov initiated ejection with navigator Vladimir Shendrikh departing the aircraft first. The Zvezda K-36D-3.5 ejection seats work perfectly and both crew descend on a taxiway unhurt. The Su-30 impacted some distance from the crew. Video of this accident is widely available on the internet.

16 June
A United States Marine Corps F/A-18 fighter-attack jet crashes, killing a student pilot and injuring a flight instructor. The aircraft had taken off from the Marine Corps Air Station in Yuma but was from Marine Fighter Attack Training Squadron 101, stationed in San Diego. Capt. Douglas F. Aguilera, 33, of Paso Robles, Calif., was killed. Maj. John P. Hesford, 33, of Worcester, Mass., was treated at Yuma Regional Medical Center and released.

30 June
A NAS Whiting Field, Florida, flight instructor bails out of a USN Beechcraft T-34C Turbo Mentor and parachutes to safety moments before the aircraft crashes near East Brewton, Alabama. The aircraft had recently been modified to add a GPS system which had unknowingly crimped/crushed a metal line from the pitot/static system. During the flight the aircraft was intentionally placed in a spin (common practice used to teach student naval aviators how to recognize and recover). As a result of the crushed pitot/static line cockpit displays erroneously indicated that the aircraft was in a "spiral" which appeared to be increasing in airspeed as a result of the damaged pitot/static system. The pilot bailed out in accordance with NATOPS procedures.

30 July
A Panavia Tornado IDS, tactical number 45+05 of the GAF crashed near Engeløya, Norway during a NATO exercise.

10 August
A Pakistan Navy Breguet Atlantic of 29 Squadron, is shot down by two Indian Air Force MiG-21 jets, citing airspace violation. Dubbed the Atlantique Incident, it raises tensions between India and Pakistan.

20 September
A Swedish Air Force Saab JAS-39 Gripen, 39156, '56', of F7 Wing, 2nd Sqn., crashes into Vänern at about 1430 hrs. during an air-to-air combat exercise. Aircraft sank in about 260 feet of water (80 m). Pilot ejected safely and was recovered by Hkp 10 SAR helicopter. The accident was caused by a design flaw in the aircraft's control system, rendering it in a stalled mode after passing another aircraft's vortex. This was the first loss of a Gripen since the type became operational.

22 October
A Royal Air Force BAE Systems Hawk of 100 Sqn based at RAF Leeming crashed near Shap, Cumbria killing the pilot and navigator.

14 November
A VS-32 Lockheed S-3 Viking, BuNo 158864 pitched up, rolled left and crashed on launch from CV-67 to practice for the Dubai airshow. Both crew members ejected but did not survive.

22 November
A Japanese Air Self Defense Force T-33A 51-5648 crashed into Iruma River, killing 2 pilots, who managed to avoid a residential district by ditching.

9 December
During a USN "Fast Rope" training exercise, a Boeing-Vertol CH-46D Sea Knight, BuNo 154790, c/n 2397, helicopter of HMM-166 departs the USS Bonhomme Richard and approaches the fantail landing pad of the USNS Pecos, cruising ≈15 miles (24 km) WSW of Point Loma, California at 1316 hrs. The port rear landing gear leg of the helicopter snags a safety net on the deck edge and the chopper tips backwards into the Pacific, sinking within five seconds. Eleven of 18 on board escape and are picked up by Navy SEALS following the USNS Pecos in zodiac boats. The bodies of six U.S. Marines and one U.S. Navy corpsman, from the 1st Force Recon, 5th Platoon, 15th Marine Expeditionary Unit, based at Camp Pendleton, California, are recovered from a depth of 3,600 feet.

10 December
A United States Air Force Lockheed C-130E Hercules, 63-7854, of 61st Airlift Squadron, 463d Airlift Group, crashes during landing at Ahmed Al Jaber air base, Kuwait City, Kuwait, killing three of the 94 people on board. Investigation report, released 31 March 2000, blamed crew complacency and failure to follow governing directives during approach to the runway, failing to monitor instruments, a critical function for night flying in reduced visibility.

== See also ==
- List of accidents and incidents involving military aircraft
- List of C-130 Hercules crashes
