= Accidents and incidents involving the JAS 39 Gripen =

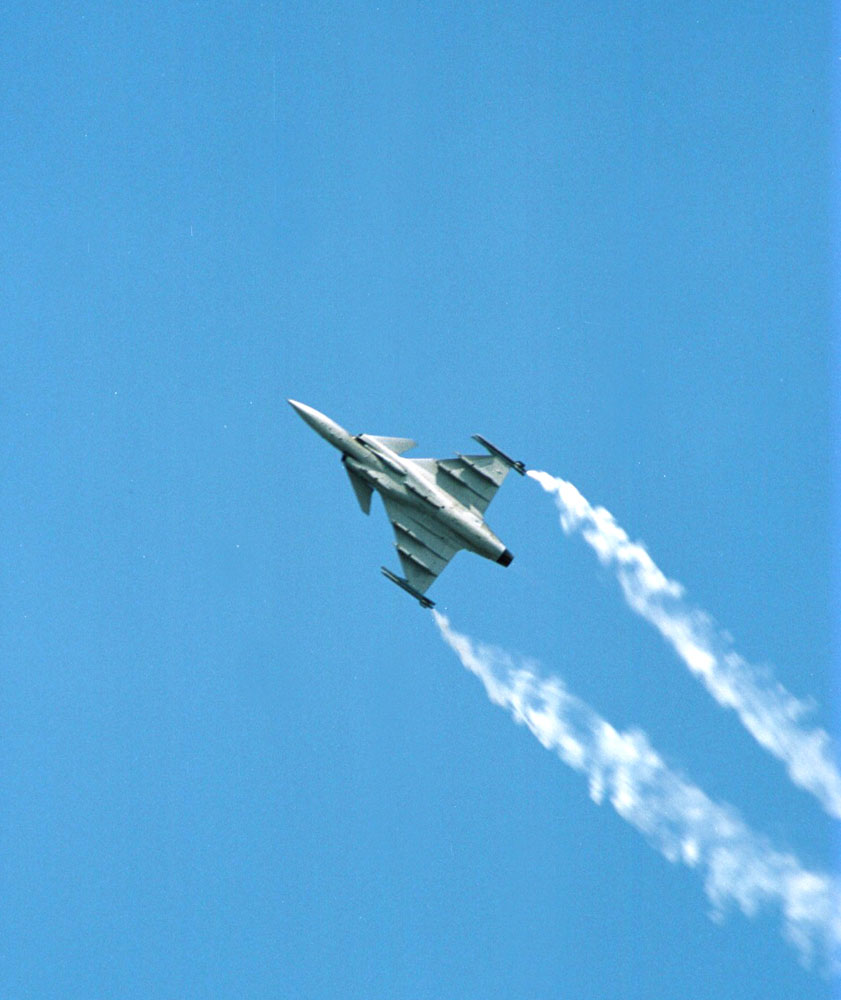
A Gripen aircraft at the Farnborough Airshow in 2006.

The JAS 39 Gripen is a fighter aircraft manufactured by the Swedish aerospace company Saab.

Eight Gripens were destroyed in crashes, two of them before the delivery to the Swedish Air Force. These aircraft included one prototype, one production aircraft and three in service with the Swedish Air Force. Two Gripens in service with the Hungarian Air Force, and one in service with the Royal Thai Air Force, were also destroyed in crashes. In addition, one aircraft was lost in a ground accident during an engine test, for a total of nine hull losses.

== Crashes during testing ==
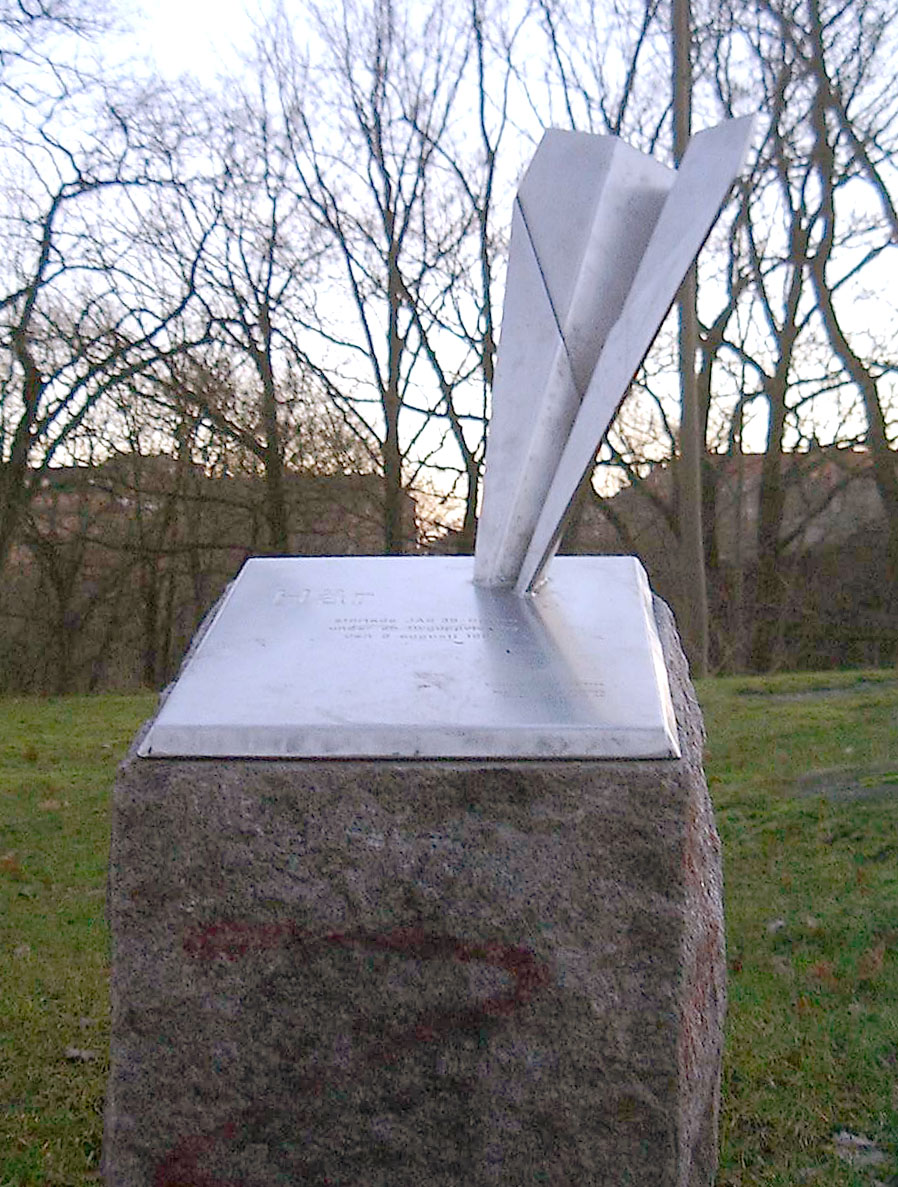
A sculpture in stainless steel by Thomas Qvarsebo, depicting a paper plane with a crumpled nose, has been placed on the spot of the 1993 crash.

=== February 1989 ===
On 2 February 1989, the first prototype JAS 39-1 crashed on its sixth flight, when attempting to land in Linköping. The accident was filmed in a now-famous recording by a crew from Sveriges Television's news program Aktuellt. The pilot, Lars Rådeström, remained in the tumbling aircraft, and escaped with a fractured elbow and some minor injuries. The crash was the result of pilot-induced oscillation (PIO). Extremely gusty winds also contributed. The accident investigation committee later concluded that the problem was software related.

=== August 1993 ===
On 8 August 1993, a production JAS 39A Gripen (serial number 39-102) crashed on the central Stockholm island of Långholmen, near the Västerbron bridge, when the aircraft stalled after a slow speed manoeuver during a display over the Stockholm Water Festival. The crash was, like the first one, caused by pilot-induced oscillation, and caught on film. The problem was later identified as the same software malfunction in the flight control system as the one in the crash in 1989 and was corrected as late as 1995. The pilot – Rådeström again – ejected from the aircraft, and landed safely by parachute, though he became stuck in a tree. The aircraft fell to the ground and caught fire on impact. Despite large crowds of onlookers, only one person on the ground was injured, (Note: A woman was hospitalized for three weeks for burns.) and the fire was soon put out.

The aircraft had been delivered to the Swedish Defence Materiel Administration in June, only two months prior to the crash. The display flight was not classified as in-service, because it was being flown at a display by a test pilot rather than a Swedish Air Force officer.

== Crashes in service ==
=== Swedish Air Force ===
==== September 1999 ====
On 20 September 1999, a JAS 39A Gripen (serial no 39-156) from Skaraborg Wing (F 7) crashed into Lake Vänern during a dogfight exercise. During a steep (−70°) dive the airplane passed through the wake vortex of the other aircraft. The pilot (Captain Rickard Mattsson) felt a disturbance in the air, and then noticed that the plane no longer responded to his commands, followed by a highest-severity alert from the ground-collision warning system which indicates that a turn to avoid a crash would require more than 10 g. The pilot ejected from the aircraft, which continued the dive and crashed while the pilot landed safely by parachute in the lake. His colleague observed him getting into the inflatable life raft, and he was picked up by a rescue helicopter 27 minutes later.

The Swedish Accident Investigation Board (SHK) could not fully determine the cause of the crash until the black box was found some 15 months later. The preliminary report is available in English. SHK's final report – not available in English – concluded that an interaction between the aerodynamic transient from the wake vortex and the design of the control laws of the flight control software had caused the airplane to stall, which made it uncontrollable for a short period of time. When the plane entered the vortex the pilot's pitch command was fully "up", which is interpreted as a request for the maximum angle of attack, so the angle of attack of the plane was at the maximum limit of 20°. As the plane passed through the vortex the new direction of the airstream reduced the effective angle of attack to 5°, but since the stick remained in the same position the software moved the control surfaces (canards and elevons) into a pitch-up position. After the plane exited the vortex, some time was required to move the surfaces back towards the neutral position, and meanwhile the plane rapidly pitched up to an angle of attack of 45° and stalled.

At the same time, when the pilot felt the "bump" in the air he reflexively made large stick movements, commanding first maximum pitch down and then maximum pitch up, but while the angle of attack is above the 20° limit the control software ignores pilot commands and prioritizes reducing the pitch, so there was no response from the airplane. The pilot never realized that the plane had entered a stall and only noted that his pitch inputs had no effect, so when he saw the ground collision warning he elected to vacate the aircraft in accordance with the flight manual. The period when the angle of attack was above 20° lasted 3.2 seconds; coincidentally the airplane returned to a controllable condition almost exactly when the pilot released the stick to pull the ejection seat handle. Following this accident, Saab modified the flight control software to detect when the airplane is passing through a wake vortex and apply different control laws during the transient.

The investigation board could not determine why the ground-collision warning activated – based on the speed and altitude of the plane it should only have given a low-severity warning. The report considers a few different hypotheses, for example the high angle of attack could have caused the altimeter to measure an incorrect value, leading to a miscalculation of the sink rate.

The flight status at the moment of ejection was: altitude 750 m, flight angle −75 degrees, speed 350 km/h, angle of attack −8 degrees, and load −1.5 g.

==== June 2005 ====
On 1 June 2005, a JAS 39A Gripen (serial no 39–184) from Airwing F 17 Kallinge, when acting as a target in a dogfight exercise, apparently ceased to obey commands from the pilot, Lieutenant colonel Axel Nilsson. After attempting to regain control while the aircraft slowly descended, the pilot ejected from the aircraft and landed safely by parachute.

SHK's investigation – report published in June 2007 – showed that the aircraft initially travelled at Mach 0.6 in a shallow dive at an altitude of 5500 m. When attacked, the pilot, not fully aware of the rather low speed, tried to escape by taking the plane into a steep (60 degrees) climb. This led to a "low speed"-warning, for which the pilot tried to compensate by lighting the afterburner and manoeuvering into an offset looping, briefly applying maximum angle of attack. The intent was to regain speed at the top of the loop. The speed was too low, and the aircraft ended up in an inverted (upside-down) deep stall, and started to descend slowly. The inadequate response to the low-speed warning may have been due to the flight manual being unclear, and to the pilot being out of practice after flying a low number of flight hours per year.

When the airplane is stalled, the flight control software enters an automatic recovery mode which automatically tries to roll level, cancel spin, and reduce angle of attack. However, this mode can not handle deep stalls. Theoretically, the pilot could have recovered by disabling the automatic mode to directly control the flight control surfaces (direct link mode), and then executing a "pitch rock" maneuver. But such a recovery maneuver is not part of ordinary pilot training; the direct link mode was only intended for use by test pilots. Ultimately the pilot had to abandon the aircraft.

==== April 2007 ====
On 19 April 2007, a JAS 39C Gripen (serial no 39-259) from Norrbotten Wing (F 21) crashed at the Vidsel airfield in northern Sweden. The pilot, Captain Stefan Kaarle, was involuntarily ejected out of the aircraft in mid-air while approaching the airstrip in order to land. He landed safely by parachute. All C/D Gripens were temporarily grounded. The ejection seat handle – placed between the pilot's thighs – had been activated by the motions of the pilot's flight suit. Repeated jerks on the handle, resulting from the G-suit inflating and deflating during the flight, had ultimately exerted enough force on it to cause the ejection. Moments before the ejection, the pilot had taken the aircraft into a tight turn, thus causing the G-suit to activate.

For the C and D models of Gripen, the ejection seat handle had been moved and redesigned to make room for larger cockpit displays. The investigation showed that the new handle was prone to these kinds of uncommanded ejections. A survey among the air-wings that fly the Gripen revealed that the ejection handle had become dislodged before, though not far enough to cause an ejection. The investigation concluded that the quality assurance procedures between the Swedish Defense Material Administration, the Swedish Air Force and Saab were not adequate to discover the error in time and were therefore cited as the root cause of the accident.

=== Hungarian Air Force ===
==== May 2015 ====
On 19 May 2015, a two-seater JAS 39 D number 42 from the Hungarian Air Force overran the runway at Čáslav Air Base, Czech Republic. Both crewmen (Brigadier general Csaba Ugrik and Major Gergely Grof) ejected safely with no injuries. The aircraft was heavily damaged with the nose section separated.

==== June 2015 ====
On 10 June 2015, a single-seater JAS 39C number 30 from the Hungarian Air Force performed a belly landing at Kecskemét Air Base, Hungary. The pilot, Major Sándor Kádár, ejected successfully, but experienced spinal injuries. The aircraft was later repaired.

==== August 2026 ====
On 24 August 2026 a Hungarian Gripen was lost near Szolnok, Hungary. Pilot ejected safely, but suffered spinal injuries.

=== Royal Thai Air Force ===
==== January 2017 ====
On 14 January 2017, a Gripen crashed during an air show for the Children's Day in Hat Yai, Songkhla province, Thailand. Squadron leader Dilokrit Pattavee was killed when the aircraft crashed on a runway at Wing 56 during the air show at around 9.20 am. About an hour later, Thai media reported an airport fire engine overturned while rushing to put out the fire. Hat Yai International Airport had to close to clear the runway. The investigation did not find any problems with the aircraft, and the cause of the crash is suspected to be pilot spatial disorientation.

== Other incidents ==
=== Swedish Air Force ===
==== October 2007 ====
On 3 October 2007, a Swedish Air Force Gripen had a separation conflict with a passenger aircraft, i.e. they did not keep the required separation in altitude and distance. The passenger aircraft was a Saab 340 from Avitrans Nordic on its way from Ronneby to Bromma. At their closest, the aircraft were separated 30 meters vertically and 950 meters horizontally. The incident took place in the airspace south of Oskarshamn. The pilot on the passenger aircraft was alerted by the TCAS that another aircraft was approaching at the same altitude.

SHK concluded that the incident took place because the Gripen pilot inadvertently went below his assigned flight level and ended up on the same flight level at the passenger aircraft. SHK placed the root cause of this with the lack of adequate routines in the Swedish Air Force for receiving and reading back instructions from air traffic control. A contributary cause of the incident was said to be a lack of support systems in the Gripen to help the pilot with the aforementioned task. Such a system is currently being introduced in the Swedish Air Force Gripens. The system will alert the pilot if the flight deviates from the assigned flight level.

==== August 2009 ====
On 6 August 2009, a Gripen from F 17 Kallinge belly-landed and skidded off the runway, after the pilot forgot to extend the landing gear before landing. A minor fire broke out, but it was soon put out by the airbase fire brigade. The pilot escaped unharmed and could walk away from the aircraft. According to the SHK report, a contributory cause was high mental workload because the pilot had recently transitioned to flying JAS 39C, which uses international units (feet, knots) instead of metric units (meters, km/h). The ground proximity warning system activated 8 seconds before touchdown, but the pilot disregarded it because it was known to sometimes give false alarms.

==== May 2010 ====
On 31 May 2010, a Gripen from Norrbotten Wing (F 21) came loose and sped away during a static engine test. The aircraft gained considerable speed before rolling off the hard surface and onto nearby soft terrain, where it then flipped over. The technician in the aircraft, Lieutenant Sandra Halvarsson, escaped with minor injuries. There is unconfirmed information that the engine was accidentally started with full throttle. As the accident did not involve a plane flying or preparing to fly, it is not considered to be a crash.

=== Czech Air Force ===
==== October 2006 ====
On 11 October 2006, a pilot from the Czech Air Force flying a Gripen almost hit a target-towing Learjet 35 in a live fire exercise at Vidsel airfield in northern Sweden. When practicing using the on-board automatic cannon, the Czech pilots mistakenly targeted a reserve target close to the towing plane instead of the intended target 600 meters behind it. After several "dry runs", live firing commenced, and the first pilot fired on the reserve target. Several rounds hit it, and were calculated to have passed within 10 meters of the Learjet. After this the Czech pilots discovered the actual target they were supposed to fire on, and proceeded to attack it instead. The crew of the Learjet did not notice anything out of the ordinary besides hearing the sound of the cannon, without making the connection that they had been fired upon. The incident was discovered after landing.

SHK's investigation concluded that the causes of the incident were that too many activities were scheduled for too short a time span; that the safety regulations concerning live fire exercises were outdated; and that the assignment of responsibilities and duties of the Swedish Armed Forces, the Swedish Defence Material Administration, Saab Special Flight Operations and the Czech military units were unclear. These causes put together resulted in the Czech pilots not being fully aware of the true configuration of the Learjet and the targets, which in turn led to them targeting the wrong target and one of them eventually firing on it. Contributing causes were that the Czech pilots had little to no experience of this kind of exercise, and that the target-towing Learjet had no means of monitoring the exercise. For instance the Learjet lacked a radar warning receiver that could have revealed that they had been targeted by the Gripens.
