= Lars Rådeström =

Swedish test pilot

Lars Gunnar Robert Rådeström (born 7 June 1944) is a Swedish former fighter aircraft test pilot.

== Crashes with Gripen ==
Rådeström was the pilot in the first two Gripens to crash, while the aircraft was still in the test series. Both crashes were caught on film by television crews from Sveriges Television.

- The first crash occurred on 2 February 1989 during an attempt to land at Saab's airstrip at Linköping/Saab Airport. Rådeström remained in the tumbling aircraft, but escaped miraculously with only a fractured elbow and a few other minor injuries.
- The second crash occurred on 8 August 1993, when his aircraft stalled after a slow speed manoeuver during a display over the Stockholm Water Festival. Rådeström ejected and landed safely by parachute (though he became stuck in a tree), while the aircraft fell to the ground and caught fire at impact. Amazingly, only one person on the ground was injured, and the fire was soon put out.

Both crashes were the result of pilot-induced oscillation (PIO).

After the second crash Rådeström decided to retire as a test pilot at the age of 49. The usual retirement age of test pilots is 50, but in an interview he said that he "did not want to push [his] luck for just another year."

== See also ==
- Accidents and incidents involving the JAS 39 Gripen
