= Giannos Kranidiotis =

Greek diplomat and politician

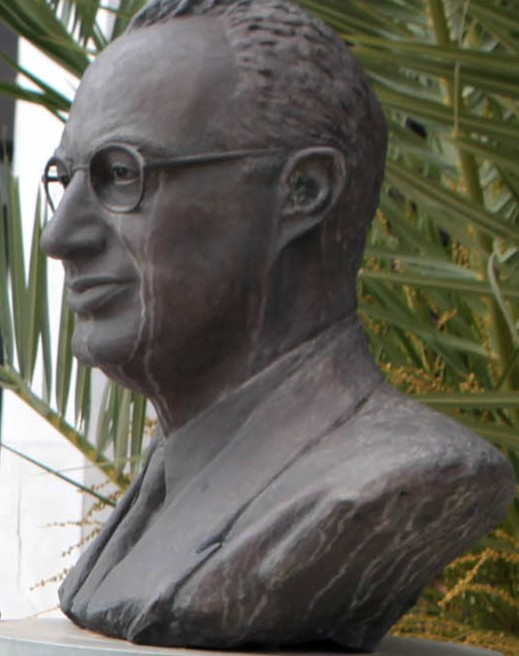

Deputy Foreign Minister of Greece
- In office 8 July 1994 – January 1995
- In office 3 February 1997 – 19 February 1999

Member of the European Parliament for Greece
- In office 24 January 1995 – 3 February 1997

Advisor on Cyprus Dispute to Prime Minister of Greece
- In office 1981–1984

Secretary of European Affairs, Greek Ministry of Foreign Affairs
- In office 1984–1989

Member of PASOK's Central Committee
- In office March 1999 – 14 September 1999

Alternate Foreign Minister of Greece
- In office 19 February 1999 – 14 September 1999

Personal details
- Born: 25 September 1947 Nicosia, British Cyprus
- Died: 14 September 1999 (aged 51) Bucharest, Romania
- Party: PASOK
- Education: University of Athens
- Alma mater: Harvard University, Sussex University

Giannos Kranidiotis (Greek: Γιάννος Κρανιδιώτης; 25 September 1947 — 14 September 1999) was a Greek diplomat and politician.

Son of the Cypriot diplomat, poet, and writer Nikos Kranidiotis, he studied law at the University of Athens and continued with postgraduate studies in international relations at Harvard and Sussex University. Member of the Panhellenic Socialist Party (PASOK) from 1976, he was an advisor on the Cyprus dispute to prime minister Andreas Papandreou from 1981 to 1984. He held a number of important posts at the Greek Ministry of Foreign Affairs: secretary of European affairs (1984–1989), deputy foreign minister (July 8, 1994–January 1995 and from February 3, 1997), and alternate foreign minister (February 19, 1999 until his death).

Kranidiotis also served as a Member of the European Parliament (1995–1997) and was elected a member of PASOK's Central Committee in March 1999. He held an honorary doctorate in international relations from the Democritus University of Thrace.

On 14th September 1999, Kranidiotis, his son Nikolas, and five other members of a government delegation, died on their way to a six-nation Balkan foreign ministers' regional cooperation meeting in Bucharest. Their aircraft, a Dassault Falcon 900 presidential jet operated by Olympic Airways, experienced severe in-flight pitch oscillations whilst descending into Bucharest Otopeni Airport, causing passengers not wearing seat belts to be thrown around the cabin.
