= Stockholm Water Festival =

Stockholm Water Festival Stockholms vattenfestival
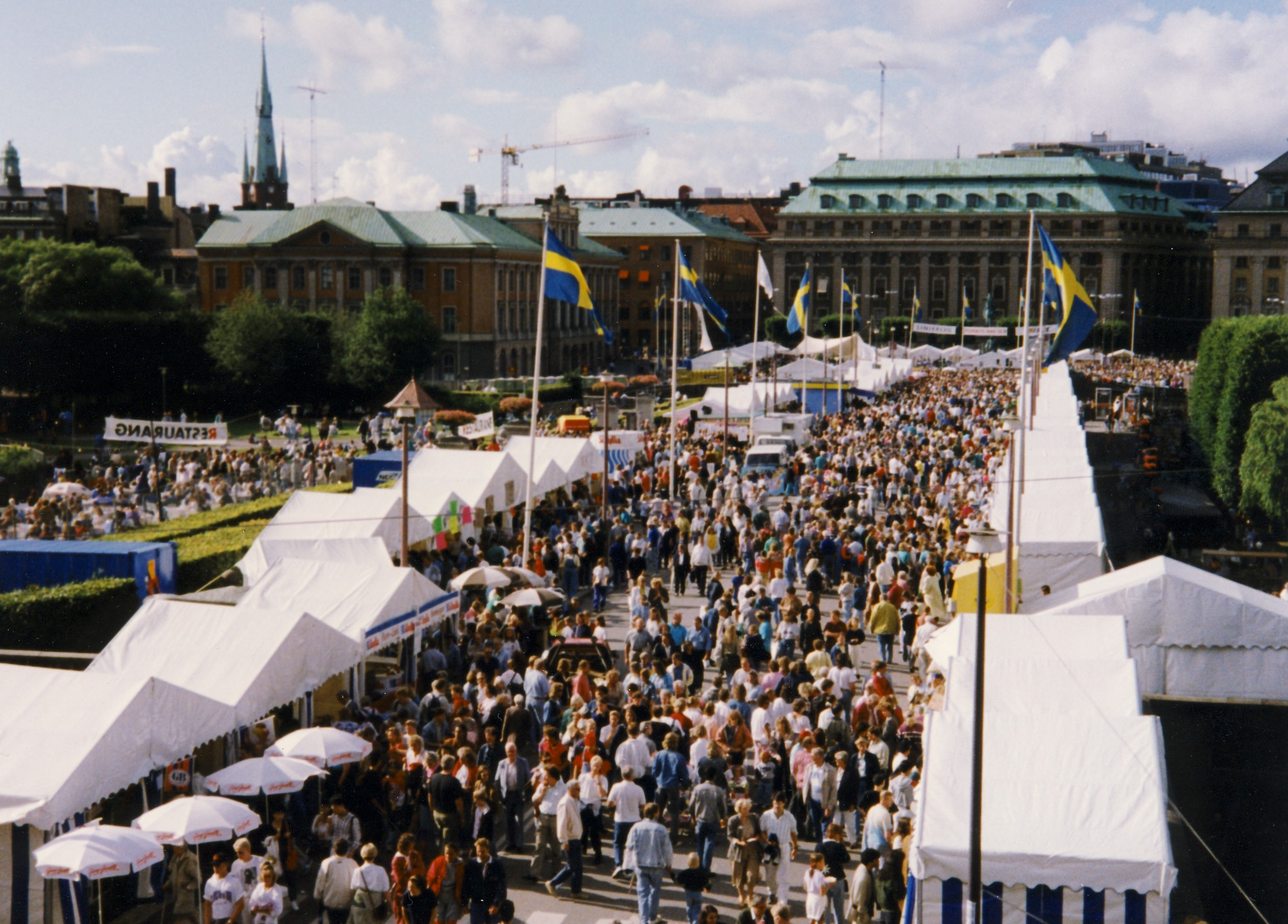
- Stockholm Water Festival on Norrbro 1991
- Status: cancelled
- Genre: festival
- Date: August
- Frequency: annual
- Location: Stockholm
- Country: Sweden
- Years active: 1991 - 1999

The Stockholm Water Festival (Swedish: Stockholms vattenfestival) was an annual street festival held in Stockholm, Sweden, in August from 1991 to 1999. The festival featured many activities in central Stockholm, but was eventually cancelled after the 1999 festival due to lack of funds.

During the Stockholm Water Festival of 1993, a JAS 39 Gripen aircraft crashed at the island of Långholmen in central Stockholm during a display of the new aircraft. Despite the crash occurring near thousands of spectators, only one person on the ground was injured.

== See also ==
- Stockholm Water Prize
