= List of accidents and incidents involving military aircraft =

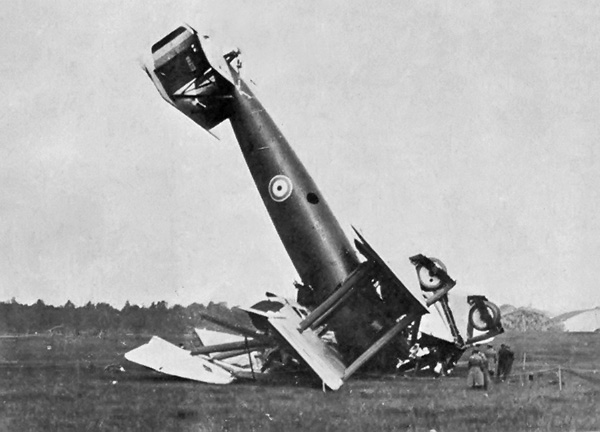
Tarrant Tabor F1765 after its crash in 1919

List of accidents and incidents involving military aircraft include all types of accident and incident, including mechanical failures, pilot error and military action. They include chronological lists, lists by conflict, lists by aircraft model and other lists. Losses due to military action during World War I and World War II are not included.

== Chronological lists ==
- List of accidents and incidents involving military aircraft before 1925
- List of accidents and incidents involving military aircraft (1925–1934)
- List of accidents and incidents involving military aircraft (1935–1939)
- List of accidents and incidents involving military aircraft (1940–1942)
- List of accidents and incidents involving military aircraft (1943–1944)
- List of accidents and incidents involving military aircraft (1945–1949)
- List of accidents and incidents involving military aircraft (1950–1954)
- List of accidents and incidents involving military aircraft (1955–1959)
- List of accidents and incidents involving military aircraft (1960–1969)
- List of accidents and incidents involving military aircraft (1970–1974)
- List of accidents and incidents involving military aircraft (1975–1979)
- List of accidents and incidents involving military aircraft (1980–1989)
- List of accidents and incidents involving military aircraft (1990–1999)
- List of accidents and incidents involving military aircraft (2000–2009)
- List of accidents and incidents involving military aircraft (2010–2019)
- List of accidents and incidents involving military aircraft (2020–present)

== By conflict ==
- List of aviation accidents and incidents in the war in Afghanistan
- List of Soviet aircraft losses during the Soviet–Afghan War
- List of Russian aircraft losses in the Second Chechen War
- List of aviation shootdowns and accidents during the Iran-Israel war
- List of aviation shootdowns and accidents during the Iraq War
- List of aviation shootdowns and accidents during the Libyan Civil War (2011)
- List of aviation shootdowns and accidents during the Libyan crisis
- List of aviation shootdowns and accidents during the Russo-Ukrainian War
- List of aviation shootdowns and accidents during the Syrian Civil War
- List of aviation shootdowns and accidents during the Saudi Arabian-led intervention in Yemen
- List of aviation shootdowns and accidents during the Yugoslav Wars
- List of aviation shootdowns and accidents during the Twelve-Day War (2025)
- List of aviation shootdowns and accidents during the 2026 Iran war

== By model ==
- List of accidents and incidents involving the English Electric Lightning
- List of F-15 losses
- List of accidents and incidents involving the Grumman A-6 Intruder
- List of Harrier family losses
- Accidents and incidents involving the JAS 39 Gripen
- List of accidents and incidents involving the Lockheed Martin F-35 Lightning II

== By air force ==
- List of Israeli Air Force training accidents
- List of fatal accidents and incidents involving Royal Air Force aircraft from 1945
- Accidents and incidents involving Russian Air Force aircraft (category page)
- List of accidents and incidents involving Philippine Air Force aircraft
- List of accidents and incidents involving Sri Lanka Air Force aircraft
- Accidents and incidents involving United States Air Force aircraft (category page)

== Other ==
- List of UAV-related incidents
