= List of aviation shootdowns and accidents during the Twelve-Day War =

This is a list of aviation shootdowns and accidents during the Twelve-Day War based on visual evidence or official self-admision from involved parties. It includes proven helicopters, fixed-wing aircraft and military drones (UCAVs).

== Timeline of aviation shootdowns and accidents ==
- 14 June 2025 - The wreckage of an Israeli IAI Eitan drone was recorded in Buin Zahra, western Iran.
- 15 June 2025 - An Iranian Air Force (IRIAF) Boeing 707 tanker aircraft was destroyed on the ground at Mashhad Airport in northeast Iran.
- (2) 16 June 2025 - Two non-operational Iranian Air Force Grumman F-14 Tomcats were destroyed on the ground at Mehrabad International Airport in Tehran by Israeli strikes.
- (8) 18 June 2025 - Eight Iranian Army Aviation Bell AH-1 SuperCobra helicopters were destroyed on the ground at a military airbase in Kermanshah, western Iran.
- 18 June 2025 - An Israeli Elbit Hermes 900 drone, serial 997, was shot down by a surface-to-air missile in Isfahan, central Iran.
- (2) 19 June 2025 - Two Israeli drones; an IAI Eitan and an IAI Heron were shot down in western Iran including one in Lorestan province by Iranian surface-to-air defenses, the interception was recorded in IR mode. The remains of the Heron-1 (Machatz), serial number 298, was found at the Iraq-Iran border.
- (3) 21 June 2025 - The IDF published footage of the destruction of three Iranian Air Force Grumman F-14 Tomcats in central Iran.
- 21 June 2025 - An Iranian Red Crescent Society Air Rescue Mil Mi-17 helicopter was damaged by an Israeli strike.
- 22 June 2025 - The IDF published footage of the destruction of an Iranian Air Force Northrop F-5 at Dezful Airport in Khuzestan province.
- 23 June 2025 - An Israeli Elbit Hermes 900 drone was shot down near Khorramabad, western Iran. Israeli officials acknowledged the loss.
- 23 June 2025 - An Israeli Elbit Hermes 900 drone was shot down in Arak, Markazi Province, Iran. Iranian media showed the wreckage of the drone with the serial number 939.
- 26 June 2025 - The wreckage of an Israeli IAI Eitan or IAI Heron drone, serial number 248, was discovered and recorded by locals in Khorramabad, Lorestan Province.

== Total aircraft losses ==
Aircraft losses
Airframe	Israel	Iran
Bell AH-1 SuperCobra	—	8
Boeing 707	—	1
Elbit Hermes 900	3	—
Grumman F-14 Tomcat	—	5
IAI Eitan	3	—
IAI Heron	1	—
Mil Mi-17	—	1
Northrop F-5	—	1
Totals	7	16

== See also ==
- List of aviation shootdowns and accidents during the 2026 Iran war
- List of aviation shootdowns and accidents during the Syrian civil war
- List of aviation shootdowns and accidents during the Libyan crisis
- List of aviation shootdowns and accidents during the Saudi Arabian-led intervention in Yemen
