= List of aviation shootdowns and accidents during the 2026 Iran war =

This is a list of aviation shootdowns, incidents and accidents during the 2026 Iran war based on visual evidence or official self-admission from involved parties. It includes proven helicopters, fixed-wing aircraft and military drones (UCAVs) losses.

== Timeline of aviation shootdowns, incidents and accidents ==
=== February ===
- 28 February 2026 - The wreckage of an Israeli Elbit Hermes 900 drone, serial number 935, was recorded at Khamaneh city in East Azerbaijan province.

=== March ===
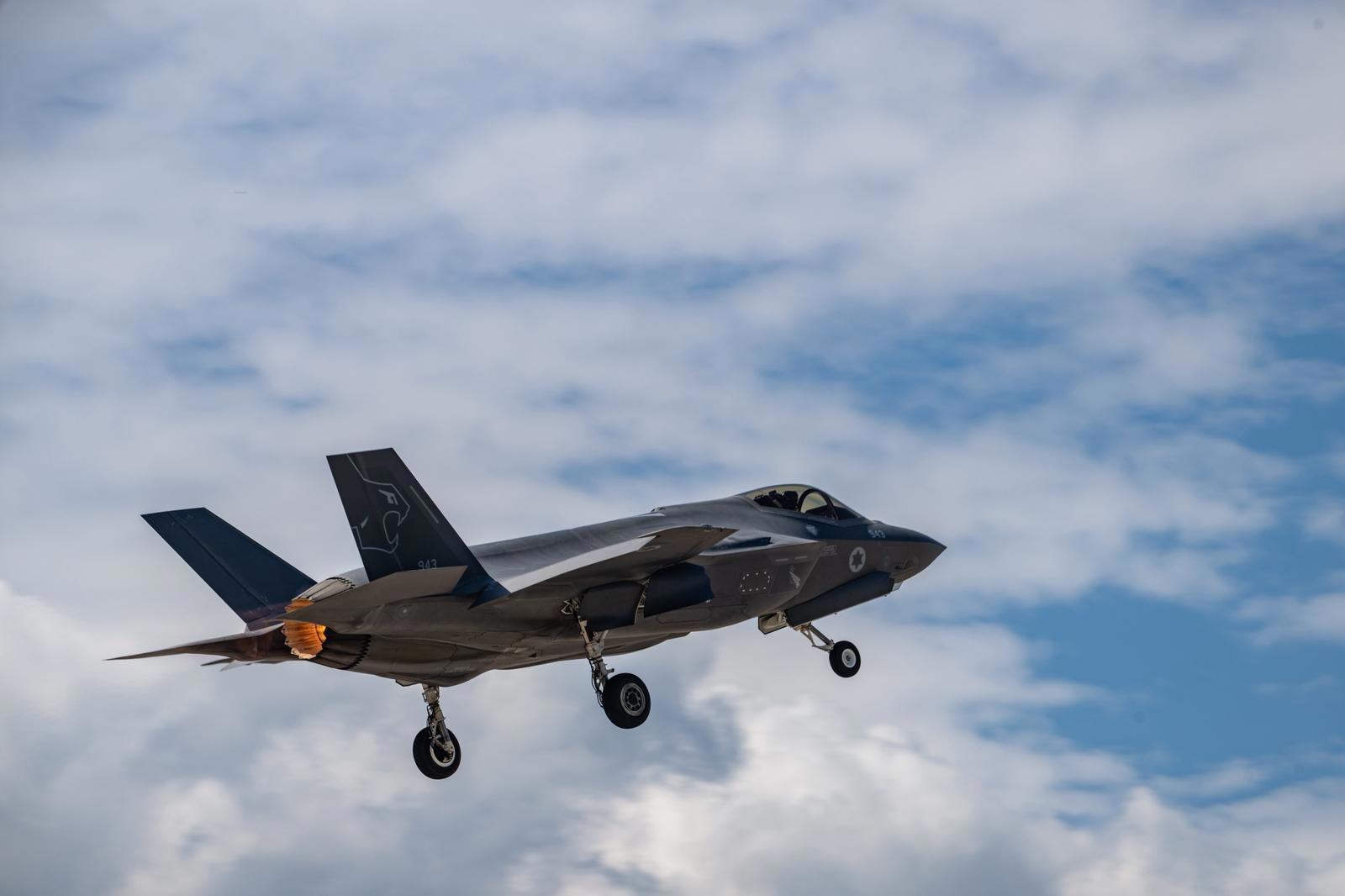
An Israeli Air Force Lockheed Martin F-35I Adir shot down an Iranian Yakovlev Yak-130, scoring the first kill of a crewed aircraft by an F-35.

Video of a suspected Iranian strike on a USAF Lockheed Martin F-35 Lightning II, released by Tasnim News Agency, 19 March 2026, the first case of a fifth-generation fighter damaged in combat.

- (2) 1 March 2026 - Two Iranian fighters, a Northrop F-5 and a McDonnell Douglas F-4 Phantom II, were destroyed in an Israeli strike at Tabriz Shahid Madani International Airport in northeast Iran.
- 1 March 2026 - Iranian media published footage of an Israeli Elbit Hermes 900 drone being intercepted over Iran.
- 1 March 2026 - An Israeli Elbit Hermes 900 was shot down in Khorramabad, Lorestan province, Iran. The drone's wreckage was posted on social media.
- (5) 2 March 2026 - US Central Command released footage of the destruction of two IRGC-AF Sukhoi Su-22 aircraft at Shiraz Shahid Dastgheib Airport. Satellite imagery showed two Lockheed C-130 Hercules and an Ilyushin Il-76 transport aircraft also destroyed at the airport.
- (2) 2 March 2026 - On 2 March 2026, according to the Qatari government, two Iranian low-flying Sukhoi Su-24 tactical bombers were detected in direction of the Al Udeid Air Base, and were shot down by a Qatari Air Force Boeing F-15EX Eagle II, After failing to respond to radio warnings. According to a post on social media, footage of the wreckage of one of the attacking Su-24s was released by Al Jazeera on 10 April. (Note: Al Jazeera contents about the IRIAF Su-24s wreckage salvage in Arabic, posted on Facebook and X for verification purpose.)
- (3) 2 March 2026 - Three United States Air Force McDonnell Douglas F-15E Strike Eagles were shot down over Kuwait by friendly fire from Kuwaiti air defences. The six crew members ejected safely into Kuwait. There is speculation that the three F-15Es were shot down by a Kuwait Air Force McDonnell Douglas F/A-18 Hornet. One F-15E crashed near Al Jahra in central Kuwait, while the other two crashed near Kuwait City.
- 2 March 2026 - An Israeli IAI Heron drone was shot down by a Qaem 114 air defense missile at Khorramabad in Lorestan province, Iran; the interception was recorded in IR mode.
- 3 March 2026 - An Israeli Elbit Hermes 900 was shot down in Khomeynishahr, Isfahan province, Iran. The shootdown and wreckage were recorded on video.
- 3 March 2026 - An Israeli Elbit Hermes 900, serial number 923 and armed with missiles, was shot down by the IRGC. The drone had minimal damage and was examined by Iranian engineers.
- 3 March 2026 - An Israeli IAI Eitan drone was shot down in Andimeshk, Khuzestan province, western Iran.
- 3 March 2026 - An Israeli Elbit Hermes 900 was shot down in Margoon County, Fars province, Iran. The drone's wreckage was published on social media.
- 3 March 2026 - An Iran Air Airbus A319 airliner, registration EP-IEP, was destroyed in an air strike at Bushehr Airport in southern Iran.
- 4 March 2026 - An Iranian Yakovlev Yak-130 was shot down by an Israeli Lockheed Martin F-35 Lightning II over Tehran in air-to-air combat. The fate of the two Iranian pilots is unknown. The IDF published footage of the interception on X. This event was the first Israeli-Iranian dogfight of the war. It occurred at Latyan Dam near Lavasan city, Tehran province.
- (5) 5 March 2026 - CENTCOM released footage showing the destruction of a Northrop F-5, Sukhoi Su-24, Yakovlev Yak-130/Sukhoi Su-25, and the destruction of three non-operational Fokker 50 airliners owned by Karun Airlines at Qasem Soleimani International Airport in Ahvaz, Khuzestan province, Iran. The three Fokkers were EP-PET, EP-GAS and EP-NFK.
- (3) 5 March 2026 - US officials told CBS News three U.S. General Atomics MQ-9 Reapers were reported lost over Iran. According to US officials, it was not clear where the airframes crashed, but one MQ-9A Reaper crashed on the coast of Iran. The same day one MQ-9A Reaper was shot down and its wreckage was found near Khorramabad.
- 6 March 2026 - An Israeli IAI Heron was shot down in Andika, Khuzestan province, Iran.
- (2) 6 March 2026 - Two Israeli IAI Eitan drones were shot down in Isfahan, Iran.
- 6 March 2026 - An Israeli IAI Heron drone, serial 285, was shot down in Lorestan province, Iran.
- 6 March 2026 - A US General Atomics MQ-9 Reaper was shot down in Isfahan, Iran, by IRGC Aerospace Forces. The shootdown and wreckage were recorded on video.
- 6 March 2026 - An Israeli Elbit Hermes 900 was shot down in Isfahan, Iran, by IRGC Aerospace Forces. The shootdown and wreckage were recorded on video.
- (19) 7 March 2026 - Israeli aircraft attacked Mehrabad International Airport in Tehran. Satellite imagery showed the destruction of 19 aircraft. Eleven were cargo aircraft, including an IRGC Harbin Y-12, three Boeing 747s, three IRGC Antonov An-74s, and four Ilyushin Il-76s, two of which belonged to Pouya Air, registered EP-PUL and EP-PUS. Two were aerial refueling tanker Boeing 707s. The other six were airliners, which included a Qeshm Air Fokker 100, registered EP-FQG, an Airbus A340 and Airbus A320 in storage, a Pars Air Bombardier CRJ200 registered EP-PAB, a Boeing 737 Classic, and an unidentified wide-body aircraft, likely an Airbus A300 or Iran Air Airbus A330.
- 7 March 2026 - A US General Atomics MQ-9 Reaper was shot down in Hormozgan province, southern Iran.
- 7 March 2026 - A US General Atomics MQ-9 Reaper was shot down in Tangestan, Bushehr province, Iran.
- 9 March 2026 - An Emirati helicopter crashed in a combat mission, killing two servicemen, Emirati officials reported.
- 9 March 2026 - A US General Atomics MQ-9 Reaper was shot down by pro-Iranian Iraqi militias in Basra, Iraq.
- 9 March 2026 - An Israeli IAI Heron drone, serial number 21#, was shot down in Markazi province, Iran.
- (12) 9 March 2026 - Multiple aircraft were destroyed at Shahid Beheshti International Airport in Isfahan. Satellite imagery confirmed at least three destroyed Grumman F-14 Tomcats and nine Chengdu J-7s.
- 10 March 2026 - An Israeli Elbit Hermes 900 was shot down in Borujerd, Lorestan.
- 11 March 2026 - A USAF General Atomics MQ-9 Reaper was shot down in Kerman province, Iran.
- (3) 11 March 2026 - CENTCOM published videos showing the destruction of a Lockheed C-130 Hercules, a Lockheed P-3 Orion, registered 5-8704 and an Ilyushin Il-76 registered 5-8210, at Ayatollah Hashemi Rafsanjani Airport in Kerman, Iran.
- (2) 12 March 2026 - A United States Air Force Boeing KC-135 Stratotanker aerial tanker, serial number 60-0347, crashed following what CENTCOM stated was a refueling incident over Western Iraq, an apparent mid-air collision with another KC-135, serial number 63–8017. The six crew on board were reported dead. 63-8017 made an emergency landing at Ben Gurion International Airport in Tel Aviv, having lost the upper portion of its vertical stabilizer, while 60-0347 broke apart mid-air and crashed.
- (5) 13 March 2026 - Two CENTCOM officials reported five USAF Boeing KC-135 Stratotanker refueling aircraft were moderately damaged by an Iranian missile strike at Prince Sultan Air Base in Al-Kharj, Saudi Arabia.
- 13 March 2026 - A USAF General Atomics MQ-9 Reaper drone was shot down by Iranian forces in Bandar Abbas, Iran. Iranian media published footage of the shootdown and wreckage.
- (3) 15 March 2026 - Iranian ballistic and drone attacks leave one General Atomics MQ-9 Reaper drone from the Italian Air Force destroyed in the ground at Ali Al Salem Air Base, Kuwait. Two Italian Eurofighter Typhoons were also damaged by shrapnel and remained non-operational.
- 15 March 2026 - An Iranian government Airbus A340 airliner, registration EP-IGA, was destroyed in an IDF strike on Mehrabad International Airport in Tehran.
- 16 March 2026 - An ATA Airlines McDonnell Douglas MD-80, registered EP-TAM, and an Islamic Republic of Iran Government Airbus A321, registered EP-IGD, were destroyed at Tehran Mehrabad International Airport.
- 16 March 2026 - An Israeli Elbit Hermes 450 Zik drone was shot down by Hezbollah fighters using a MANPADS in south Lebanon.
- (Israel) (3) 18 March 2026 - Three private planes at Ben Gurion Airport in Tel Aviv were damaged by debris from intercepted Iranian missiles.
- 18 March 2026 - An IRIAF Bell 214 helicopter was destroyed in an Israeli airstrike on Sanandaj Airport, Kurdistan province, western Iran.
- 19 March 2026 - A US Lockheed Martin F-35 Lightning II was damaged by likely Iranian ground fire during a combat mission over Iran. The aircraft made an emergency landing at a US airbase in the Middle East, with the pilot reportedly in stable condition but suffering shrapnel wounds. CENTCOM confirmed the emergency landing and claimed the aircraft landed safely, while an NPR correspondent reported the aircraft made a hard landing and would be out of service for a long period. Iranian officials claimed it as a victory for its air-defense forces: the Islamic Revolutionary Guard Corps said it had "seriously damaged" the F-35 over central Iran. Iran's Tasnim News Agency released a video purporting to show the interception, perhaps by a infrared search and track system. A Ukrainian news agency said IRGC's Raad air defense system could have hit the aircraft, while Chinese analysts told the South China Morning Post that the damage was likely caused by an adapted air-to-air missile rather than a larger S-300-style SAM. It was the F-35's first combat-related emergency landing. If confirmed, it would be the first Iranian interception of a US manned aircraft.
- (3) 19 March 2026 - US officials told Bloomberg a total of 12 General Atomics MQ-9 Reaper drones were lost in the war, including 9 shot down by Iran, one destroyed in the ground on Jordan by an Iranian missile, and two crashed.
- 20 March 2026 - A US General Atomics MQ-9 Reaper was shot down in Bushehr province, Iran. The remains of the engulfed drone were recorded and published in social media.
- 21 March 2026 - The Ministry of Defense of Qatar said a helicopter was lost due to technical reasons and crashed in the sea. Of the crew of seven, six were reported dead and the remaining missing. The crew consisted of four Qatari servicemen, a Turkish soldier and two Turkish civilians working for Aselsan, a Turkish defense firm.
- (5) 21 March - At least five aircraft parked at airports sustained damage from Iranian attacks. Two of these - including an Emirates Airbus A380 and a smaller Saudia Airbus A321 - were hit while parked at Dubai International Airport early in the conflict, according to people familiar with the incidents.
- 21 March 2026 - An Iranian Chengdu J-7 fighter was destroyed in an airstrike on Shahid Sadooghi Airport in Yazd.
- 23 March 2026 - A Sikorsky UH-60 Black Hawk helicopter of the US Army's 4th Combat Aviation Brigade was damaged at Camp Victory, Baghdad International Airport. Its tail boom was hit in a drone strike by the Islamic Resistance in Iraq, an Iranian backed militia.
- (4) 27 March 2026 - An Iranian missile and drone attack on Prince Sultan Air Base in Saudi Arabia left multiple US aircraft destroyed or damaged, including at least one Boeing KC-135 Stratotanker, one Boeing KC-46 Pegasus, one Boeing E-3 Sentry AWACS destroyed and another damaged. At least 29 US servicemen were wounded during a week of attacks.
- 28 March 2026 - A General Atomics MQ-9 Reaper drone is destroyed by Iranian air defenses in Shiraz, southwestern Iran.
- 28 March 2026 - An Israeli IAI Heron was shot down by IRGC Aerospace Forces using an air defence missile, during a combat sortie in the east of Hormuz, Iran.
- (Iran) (2) 29 March 2026 - Two Mahan Air airliners, an Airbus A340 registered EP-MME and a Boeing 777 registered EP-MTC were struck and destroyed at Mashhad Shahid Hasheminejad International Airport.
- 30 March 2026 - An Antonov An-32 transport aircraft of the Iraqi Air Force was damaged at Baghdad International Airport by an Iranian-backed Iraqi militia, the Popular Mobilization Forces, using Shaheb-12 missiles.
- (2) 31 March 2026 - Iranian forces shot down two General Atomics MQ-9 Reaper drones over Isfahan, using the AD-08 Majid short-range air defense system, which is designed for low-altitude engagements.
- (Iran) 31 March 2026 - A Caspian Airlines McDonnell Douglas MD-80 was damaged by shrapnel during Israeli/U.S. attacks at Tehran-Mehrabad Airport.

=== April ===
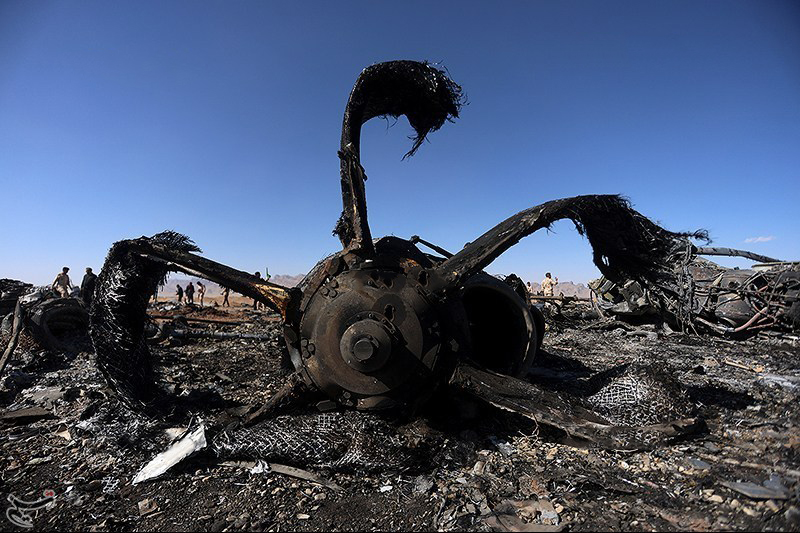
Remains of a Lockheed MC-130 at a makeshift airstrip near Mahyar, Isfahan province.

- 1 April 2026 - An Israeli Elbit Hermes 450 Zik drone was shot down by Hezbollah fighters in south Lebanon, Hezbollah and Israeli sources reported.
- 2 April 2026 - An unidentified Israeli drone was reportedly shot down by Islamic Resistance Front in Syria fighters above the Quneitra Governorate in Southern Syria.
- / 2 April 2026 - An CAIG Wing Loong II was shot down by Iranian forces over the skies of Shiraz, Iran. The only operators in the region are the United Arab Emirates and Saudi Arabia.
- 2 April 2026 - A US General Atomics MQ-9 Reaper drone was shot down by Iranian forces over Shiraz Iran. The shot down sequence of the drone and the wreckage was published by Iranian media.
- 3 April 2026 - Iranian forces shot down a U.S. Air Force McDonnell Douglas F-15E Strike Eagle from the 494th Fighter Squadron over western Iran. One ejection seat was found near the crash site. Axios confirmed the loss of a US fighter jet and reported a CSAR mission underway. The pilot was successfully rescued by U.S. forces after the crash, and the weapon systems officer (WSO) was later rescued on 5 April.
- (2) 3 April 2026 - Two Sikorsky UH-60 Black Hawk (Note: the helicopters may have been HH-60 Pave Hawk variants) helicopters that were involved in the F-15E search and rescue efforts were struck by Iranian fire, injuring some of the crew on board. The helicopters managed to return to base.
- 3 April 2026 - A Fairchild Republic A-10 Thunderbolt II ground attack aircraft was shot down by Iranian fire. The pilot ejected over the Strait of Hormuz in the Persian Gulf and was rescued. The A-10 was mobilized to support the CSAR mission of the crew of the F-15E.
- (3) 3 April 2026 - A Boeing CH-47 Chinook helicopter was destroyed on the ground in Kuwait in an Iranian drone attack. Images showed the burned-out frontal section of the helicopter and its forward rotor damaged. Satellite imagery shows a US Army Boeing CH-47 Chinook helicopter and a Sikorsky CH-53E Super Stallion helicopter destroyed at Camp Buehring and Ali Al Salem Air Base in Kuwait.
- / 3 April 2026 - The remains of a shot down CAIG Wing Loong II drone were found by fishermen in the Persian Gulf. The only operators in the region are the United Arab Emirates and the Kingdom of Saudi Arabia.
- (6) 5 April 2026 - The New York Times reported that two Lockheed MC-130 transport aircraft stationed at a makeshift U.S. remote base in Iran were blown up by US forces when three replacement planes arrived, to prevent them falling into Iranian hands. This occurred during the rescue mission for the F-15E WSO stranded in Iran on 3 April 2026. Four MD Helicopters MH-6 Little Bird helicopters were also destroyed, with their wreckage recorded at the makeshift base.
- 5 April 2026 - A US General Atomics MQ-9 Reaper drone was shot down by Iranian forces over Qeshm Island, Iran. The shoot down sequence of the drone and the wreckage was published by Iranian media.
- (2) 6 April 2026 - Israeli aircraft destroyed two IRIAF Lockheed C-130 Hercules transport aircraft at Tehran Mehrabad International Airport.
- 6 April 2026 - A US General Atomics MQ-9 Reaper drone was shot down by the Iranian Navy on Qeshm Island, Iran. The shoot down sequence of the drone and the wreckage was published by Iranian media.
- (5) 1–9 April 2026 - The U.S. Department of Defense has lost eight General Atomics MQ-9 Reaper drones in the Middle East since 1 April, bringing the total number of such devices lost in the war to 24.
- 9 April 2026 - A US Northrop Grumman MQ-4C Triton unmanned aircraft crashed after loss of communication and falling from 52,000 ft to 9,500 ft in 15 minutes, signaling its crash somewhere in the Persian Gulf. The value of the drone was $238 million.
- 24 April 2026 - Hezbollah forces shot down an IDF Elbit Hermes 450 Zik drone over Tyre using an anti-aircraft missile. Israeli officials acknowledged the loss.
- 27 April 2026 - U.S. Navy Safety Command (NAVSAFECOM) in statistics released April 28 says an Northrop Grumman MQ-4C Triton was damaged while in flight. The airframe returned to base.
- 30 April 2026 - Hezbollah says it shot down an IDF Elbit Hermes 450 Zik drone over Nabatieh, south Lebanon, and the IDF confirmed one of its unmanned aerial vehicles was downed by a Hezbollah surface-to-air missile.

=== May ===
- 6 May 2026 - A US General Atomics MQ-9 Reaper drone was shot down in the night by Iranian forces over Qeshm Island, Sea of Hormuz, Iran. Iranian media showed the wreckage of the external tanks of the drone.
- 25 May 2026 - A US General Atomics MQ-9 Reaper drone was shot down by Iranian forces over the south eastern coast. The next day Iranian media showed wreckage of the drone recovered by a boat.
- (2) 29 May 2026 - An Iranian ballistic missile attack on Ali Al Salem Air Base in Kuwait wounded five US soldiers and contractors and destroyed one General Atomics MQ-9 Reaper on the ground while damaging another.
- 30 May 2026 - Iranian forces shot down a US MQ-1 Predator drone over international waters, the US Central Command reported.

=== June ===
- 7 June 2026 - A US General Atomics MQ-9 Reaper drone was shot down in the night over Karbala, Iraq.
- 8 June 2026 - A US Army Boeing AH-64 Apache was shot down by Iranians near the Strait of Hormuz, the two pilots on board were rescued using a sea drone. Iran said that it did not deliberately target the US helicopter.
- 9 June 2026 - A US General Atomics MQ-9 Reaper drone was shot down in the night over Jam, Bushehr Province, Iran.
- 14 June 2026 - An Israeli IAI Heron drone was shot down by Hezbollah fighters over the Beqaa Valley in northeast Lebanon.

=== July ===
- 1 July 2026 - A US Navy Sikorsky SH-60 Seahawk helicopter assigned to the USS George H. W. Bush crashed over the Arabian Sea. Three of the four crew members were rescued. On 7 July 2026, the missing, presumed dead crewman was identified as the commanding officer of Helicopter Sea Combat Squadron 5, CDR Gabriel Edwards.
- 7 July 2026 - A USAF General Atomics MQ-9 Reaper drone was shot down by the IRGCASF over Khvormuj, Bushehr province, Iran.
- 16 July 2026 - A USAF General Atomics MQ-9 Reaper drone was shot down by the IRGCASF between Andimeshk, Khuzestan province and Dehloran, Ilam province, located close to the Iraqi border.
- (3) 17 July 2026 - An Iranian missile attack on Muwaffaq Salti Air Base near Azraq, Jordan left multiple US aircraft damaged or destroyed, including at least 2 Sikorsky UH-60 Black Hawk helicopters and 1 General Atomics MQ-9 Reaper drone.
- 18 July 2026 - A USAF General Atomics MQ-9 Reaper drone was shot down by the IRGCASF in Dehloran, Iran.
- 18 July 2026 - A USAF General Atomics MQ-9 Reaper drone was shot down by the IRGCASF in Asaluyeh, Iran.
- 18 July 2026 - A uAvionics Tiguar M drone probably belonging to the US armed forces was shot down by the IRGC in Kohgiluyeh and Boyer-Ahmad Province, Iran.
- 26 July 2026 - A USAF General Atomics MQ-9 Reaper drone was shot down in Babylon Governorate, Iraq.

=== August ===
- (11) 14-15 August 2026 - A USAF General Atomics MQ-9 Reaper drone was shot down by Iranian forces over Hormozgan Province Iran. The loss of as many as 45 MQ-9A Reapers was revealed the day before, roughly 25% of its inventory.

=== September ===
- 1 September 2026 - A USAF General Atomics MQ-9 Reaper was shot down in Khomeini city, Iran, by IRGC Aerospace Forces. The wreckage was recorded on video, with markings of the US National Guard.
- 8 September 2026 - A USAF General Atomics MQ-1 Predator was shot down by Iranian air defenses over the Strait of Hormuz.
- (9) 9 September 2026 - A USAF Fairchild Republic A-10 Thunderbolt II attack aircraft was hit and lost a wing following Iranian missile attacks on Muwaffaq Salti Air Base in Jordan. Around 8 USAF McDonnell Douglas F-15E Strike Eagle fighter planes sustained minor damage in the same attack.
- (2) 17 September 2026 - US officials told CBS that at least two General Atomics MQ-1 Predator drones were shot down in the last days by Iran.
- 21 September 2026 - IRGC shot down a USAF General Atomics MQ-1C Gray Eagle in the strait of Hormuz.

=== October ===
- (4) 29 October 2026 - Iranian media showed the interception sequence of four US UCAV drones over the Strait of Hormuz. The shotdown of one General Atomics MQ-1 Predator and one General Atomics MQ-9 Reaper drone were displayed as well as two unidentified drones.

=== November ===
- 3 November 2026 - A USAF General Atomics MQ-9 Reaper was shot down east of the Strait of Hormuz, by IRGC Aerospace Forces.
- 4 November 2026 - A USAF General Atomics MQ-9 Reaper was shot down east of the Strait of Hormuz, by IRGC Aerospace Forces.
- 12 November 2026 - A US Army General Atomics MQ-1C Gray Eagle was shot down over Kuhestak, Sirik County, Hormozgan by the Iranian Navy.
- 14 November 2026 - A USAF General Atomics MQ-1C Gray Eagle was shot down over Qeshm Island by iranian forces.
- 16 November 2026 - A US Army General Atomics MQ-1C Gray Eagle was shot down by forces of the Iranian Army (Artesh) Air Defence over the Strait of Hormuz.
- 17 November 2026 - Another US Army General Atomics MQ-1C Gray Eagle was shot down over the Strait of Hormuz, by IRGC Aerospace Forces.
- 18 November 2026 - A USAF General Atomics MQ-9 Reaper with Extended Range configuration was intercepted by a 358 type loitering munitions drone of the Iranian Army.
- (2) 21 October 2026 - Iranian media showed the interception sequence of two US UCAV drones over the Strait of Hormuz. The shotdown of a General Atomics MQ-1C Gray Eagle and a General Atomics MQ-9 Reaper drone were displayed.

== Total aircraft losses ==
Military aircraft losses
Airframe	Iran	Israel	United States	Others
Airbus A321	1			
Airbus A340	1			
Antonov An-32				1
Antonov An-74	3			
Bell 214	1			
Boeing 707	2			
Boeing 747	1			
Boeing AH-64 Apache			1	
Boeing CH-47 Chinook			2	
Boeing E-3 Sentry			2 (1 damaged)	
Boeing KC-135 Stratotanker			8 (6 damaged)	
Boeing KC-46 Pegasus			1	
CAIG Wing Loong II				2 /
Chengdu J-7	10			
Eurofighter Typhoon				2 (damaged)
Elbit Hermes 450		4		
Elbit Hermes 900		9		
Fairchild Republic A-10 Thunderbolt II			2 (1 damaged)	
General Atomics MQ-1C Gray Eagle			6	
General Atomics MQ-1 Predator			5	
General Atomics MQ-9 Reaper			54 (1 damaged)	1
Grumman F-14 Tomcat	3			
Harbin Y-12	1			
IAI Eitan		4		
IAI Heron		6		
Ilyushin Il-76	4			
Lockheed C-130 Hercules	5			
Lockheed Martin F-35 Lightning II			1 (damaged)	
Lockheed MC-130J Commando II			2	
Lockheed P-3 Orion	1			
McDonnell Douglas F-15E Strike Eagle			12 (8 damaged)	
McDonnell Douglas F-4 Phantom II	1			
MD Helicopters MH-6 Little Bird			4	
Northrop F-5	2			
Northrop Grumman MQ-4C Triton			2 (1 damaged)	
Sikorsky CH-53E Super Stallion			1	
Sikorsky HH-60 Pave Hawk			1 (damaged)	
Sikorsky SH-60 Seahawk			1	
Sikorsky UH-60 Black Hawk			4 (2 damaged)	
Sukhoi Su-22	2			
Sukhoi Su-24	3			
uAvionics Tiguar M			1	
Yakovlev Yak-130	1			
Unknown helicopter				1 (Note: Possibly a Boeing AH-64 Apache), 1 (Note: Boeing AH-64 Apache or NHIndustries NH90)
Unknown military aircraft	1 (Note: Sukhoi Su-25 or Yakovlev Yak-130)	1 (Note: Unidentified drone)		
Unknown UCAV			2	
Total	43	24	112	8

Civilian operated aircraft losses
Airframe	Iran	Israel	(United States) United States	Others
Airbus A319	1			
Airbus A320	1			
Airbus A321				1 (damaged)
Airbus A340	2			
Airbus A380				1 (damaged)
Boeing 737 Classic	1			
Boeing 747	2			
Boeing 777	1			
Bombardier CRJ200	1			
Fokker 50	3			
Fokker 100	1			
Ilyushin Il-76	2			
McDonnell Douglas MD-80	2 (1 damaged)			
Unknown civilian aircraft	1	3 (damaged)		3 (damaged)
Total	18	3	0	5

== See also ==
- List of aviation shootdowns and accidents during the Twelve-Day War
- List of aviation shootdowns and accidents during the Syrian civil war
- List of aviation shootdowns and accidents during the Libyan crisis
- List of aviation shootdowns and accidents during the Saudi Arabian-led intervention in Yemen
