= List of aviation shootdowns and accidents during the Libyan Civil War (2011) =

This is a list of aviation shootdowns and accidents during the Libyan Civil War (2011). It includes helicopters, fixed-wing aircraft and drones (UAVs) losses from the First Libyan Civil War (2011) including NATO aircraft from the 2011 military intervention.

== First Libyan Civil War (2011) ==
- 23 February 2011 – In the opening days of the uprising, a SIAI-Marchetti SF.260 trainer plane was crushed by a tank during a rebel attack on Misrata air base.
- 23 February 2011 – During the Battle for Benina Airport, a Mi-35 (serial number 853), was destroyed on the ground. In the same action, serial number 854 Mi-24 was captured by the rebels together with a Mi-14 of serial number 1406.
- 23 February 2011 – A Libyan Su-22UM-3K crashed near Benghazi. The crew members, Captain Attia Abdel Salem al Abdali and his co-pilot, Ali Omar Gaddafi, were ordered to bomb the city in response to the Libyan Civil War. They refused, bailing out of the aircraft and parachuting to the ground.
- 3 March 2011 – A Dutch Westland Lynx helicopter was captured along with its 3 men crew in Sirte by Libyan Forces.
- 5 March 2011 – Rebels shot down a Libyan Air Force Su-24MK during fighting around Ra's Lanuf with a ZU-23-2 antiaircraft gun. Both crew members died. BBC reported from the scene after the crash and filmed an aircraft part at the site showing the emblem of the 1124th squadron.
- 17 March 2011 – A Free Libyan Air Force MiG-21UM suffered a technical fault and crashed after takeoff from Benina airport, the aircraft defected on 15 March together with a MiG-21bis landing at Benina airport, departing from Ghardabiya AB near Sirte to become part of the Free Libyan Air Force.
- 19 March 2011 – A MiG-23BN of the Free Libyan Air Force was shot down over Benghazi by its own air defenses, who mistook it for a loyalist aircraft. The pilot was killed after he ejected too late.
- 21 March 2011 – An F-15E Strike Eagle, Tail #91–304, from the 492d FS crashed near Bengazi, Libya. Both crew members parachuted into territory held by resistance elements of the Libyan population and were eventually rescued by US Marines. Equipment problems caused a weight imbalance and contributed to the crash when leaving the target area.
- 24 March 2011 – A G-2 Galeb was destroyed after landing by a French Air Force Dassault Rafale after it violated the declared No-Fly Zone over Misrata.
- (7) 26 March 2011 – Five MiG-23s together with two Mi-35 helicopters were destroyed by the French Air Force while parked at Misrata airport, early reports misidentified the fixed wing aircraft as G-2 Galebs.
- 27 March 2011 – A Libyan Air Force Su-22 was destroyed on the ground by a Belgian Air Force F-16AM.
- 9 April 2011 – A Free Libyan Air Force Mi-25D (serial number 854, captured at the beginning of the revolt) violated the no-fly-zone to strike loyalist positions in Ajdabiya. It was shot down by Libyan ground forces during the action. The pilot, Captain Hussein Al-Warfali, died in the crash.
- 21 June 2011 – A MQ-8 from USS Halyburton (FFG-40) was shot down by pro-Gaddafi forces during a reconnaissance mission.

== Table ==
Aircraft & UAV losses
Country/Belligerent	Destroyed
(History of Libya under Muammar Gaddafi) Libyan Arab Jamahiriya	13
(Libya) Anti-Gaddafi forces	3
United States	2

== See also ==
- List of aviation shootdowns and accidents during the Libyan crisis
