= Qaryat ʽUmar al Mukhtar =

Qaryat ʽUmar al Mukhtar قرية عمر المختار
- Village
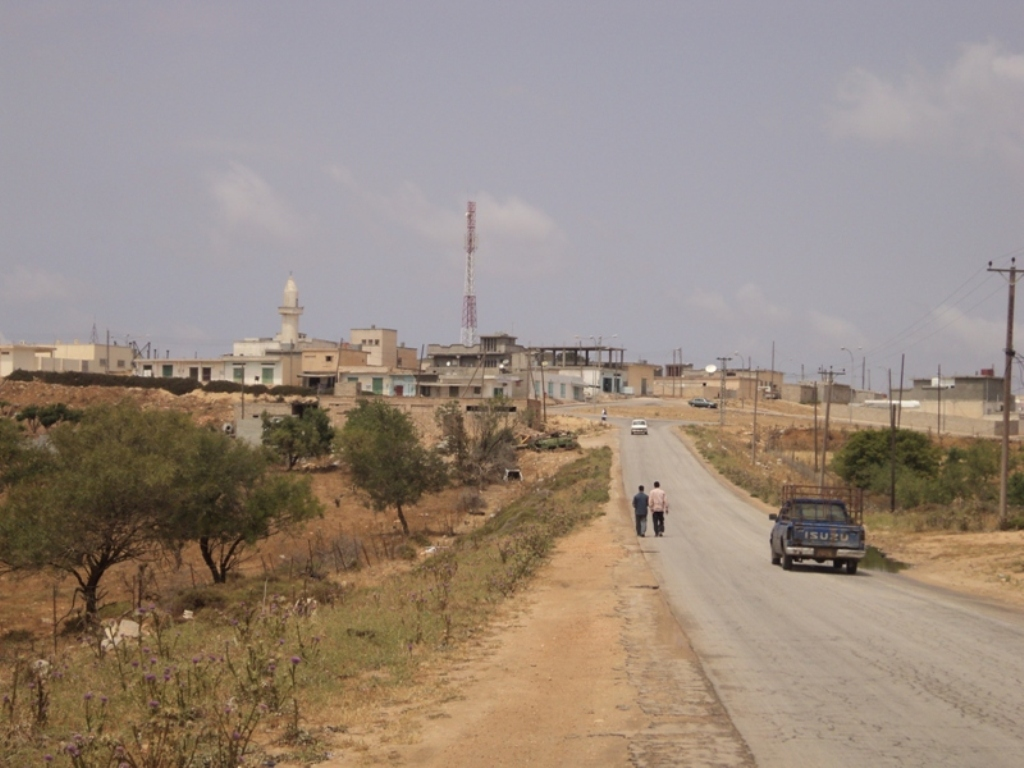

- Location in Libya
- Coordinates: 32°37′49″N 21°40′29″E
- Country: Libya
- Region: Cyrenaica
- District: Jabal al Akhdar

Population (2006)
  - Total: 6,521
- Time zone: UTC + 2

Qaryat ʽUmar al Mukhtar (Arabic: قرية عمر المختار) is a village in the District of Jabal al Akhdar in north-eastern Libya. It was named after the Libyan resistance leader Omar Mukhtar. Under the Italian rule it was known as Mameli after the Italian patriot Goffredo Mameli.

It is located 22 km south of Bayda.
