= Samad (UAV) =

Family of drones

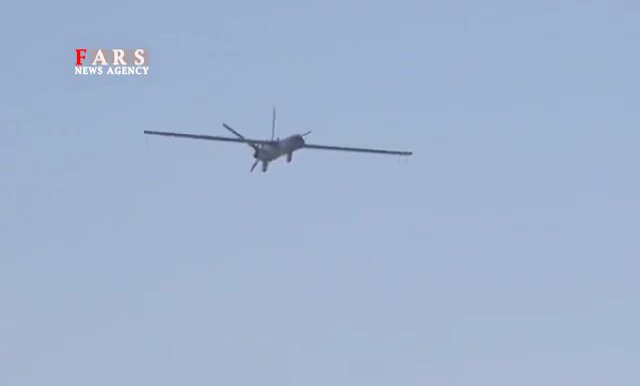
- This drone has been identified by some as a Samad-1 in flight.

General information
- Type: reconnaissance/loitering munition
- National origin: Yemen
- Manufacturer: Yemen
- Status: In service
- Primary users: Houthi movement: Iranian Armed Forces (alleged); Hezbollah (alleged)

History
- First flight: Unknown, at least since August 2018

The Samad (Arabic: صماد) (also spelled Sammad) is a family of long-range UAVs of unidentified origin used in the Middle East. The Samad is available in three variants: The Samad-1, the Samad-2 (also known as "UAV-X"), and the Samad-3. The Samad family of UAVs is primarily used by the Houthi movement in the Yemeni civil war, where the drone's long range is used to strike targets in Saudi Arabia, Israel and the UAE.

== Etymology ==
The UAV was named after Houthi leader Saleh al-Sammad, who was killed by a Saudi airstrike in 2018.

== Design ==
The Samad is available in three models. All models have distinctive V-shaped tail fins and a pusher engine. Samad UAVs have a ventral protrusion and wing skids, which they use for taking off and landing.

The Houthis say they have designed and manufactured the Samad family of drones. They say that the Samad 1 was designed in 2018 and the Samad Samad 2 and Samad 3 in 2019. Independent analysts say the Samad-2 is probably of Iranian origin.[needs better source] According to James Rogers, of the Center for War Studies at the University of Southern Denmark, the Samad 3 is believed to be supplied by Iran.

The Samad-1 is the base variant. It has a wingspan of approximately 3.5 meters. It has a range of 500 km and is for surveillance.

The Samad-2 is 2.8 meters long and has a wingspan of 4.5 meters. It has distinctive V-shaped tail fins and is powered by a rear-mounted 3W German 3W110i B2 or Chinese pusher-engine DLE 170. It is also known as the "UAV-X", the provisional designation given to it in a UN report. The Samad-2 can carry either a reconnaissance or an explosive payload. The reconnaissance version carries a camera, a Nikon D810 digital camera in one model. The attack variant has a warhead of 18 kg of explosives mixed with ball bearings.

The Samad-3 is an "extended-range" version with a conformal fuel tank mounted on the top of the drone. The dimensions are estimated at 4.5m wingspan and a length of 2.80 m, like the Samad-2. According to the Houthis, it has a range of 1,500 km and carries an explosive payload. According to Mark Voskuijl et all Samad-3 flight range is about 1800 km. Qualitatively, the Samad-3 is described as "inexpensive, small, slow and clumsy" and unlikely to strike targets with good accuracy.

== Operational history ==
The Houthis have operated Samad UAVs since at least August 2018.

The Houthis say a Samad-3 UAV was used to attack Abu Dhabi international airport on 26 July 2018. Analysis by Jeremy Binnie of Jane's of footage released by the Houthis of the attack says it is consistent with a Samad-2 or Samad-3, or also a different drone, the Hudhud 1. The UAE denied there was any drone attack on the airport. Two other alleged claims on a drone attack on the airport were reported by the Houthis, as well as two attacks on Dubai International Airport, all which were denied and unverified. An investigation by Bellingcat, published months before video of the attack was released, said "It is highly likely that a Houthi-led drone attack did not take place in Abu Dhabi and Dubai".

On the morning of 18 May 2021, during 2021 Israel–Palestine crisis, the IDF downed an Iranian Samad UAV, which was launched from Iraq and entered Emek HaMaayano, apparently from Syria or Lebanon.

On 29 November 2023, USS Carney, a US Navy destroyer, downed a Samad-3 (KAS-04), which was launched from a Houthi-controlled area of Yemen and was heading toward the warship in the southern Red Sea. USS Carney was escorting the Military Sealift Command USNS Supply, and another U.S. flagged ship carrying military equipment to the region.

On 19 July 2024, a Samad-3 launched by the Houthi government struck Tel Aviv at 3:12 a.m., killing a man and injuring ten others. The Houthi government claimed it had launched a drone that could bypass radar detection systems, whereas the Israeli military claimed that the drone had been identified, but no action was taken due to human error.

== Operators ==
- Hezbollah– Samad-1 (according to Oryxspioenkop)
- Houthis – Samad-1, Samad-2, and Samad-3
- Iran – IRGC, Samad-1 (according to the above bloggers.)
- Kata'ib Hezbollah (probable)

== Specifications (Samad-2 / UAV-X) ==
Data from UN Panel of Experts on Yemen

General characteristics

- Crew: none (unmanned)
- Length: 2.80 m (9 ft 2 in)
- Wingspan: 4.50 m (14 ft 9 in)
- Powerplant: 1 × Chinese-made DLE 170 or German-made 3W110i B2 engine

Performance

- Maximum speed: 200–250 km/h (120–160 mph, 110–130 kn)
- Ferry range: 1,200–1,500 km (750–930 mi, 650–810 nmi) (est. by engine manufacturer)

Avionics
unknown
