= List of Israeli Air Force training accidents =

The Israeli Air Force (IAF) has experienced numerous aviation accidents throughout its history, especially during training exercises. These accidents have been caused by technical malfunctions, human errors, or natural hazards.

== Fighter aircraft accidents ==
- August 6, 1953: A Mosquito aircraft crashed during a night training flight over the Mediterranean Sea. The bodies of the pilot, Lieutenant Uri El, and the navigator, Lieutenant Odded Shtil, were never found.
- February 8, 1957: A Meteor aircraft crashed into the Mediterranean Sea during a training flight. The body of the pilot, Lieutenant Colonel Avihai Mashkovitz, was not found.
- June 5, 1958: During early training with the Israeli Navy for defense against aircraft, a Dassault Mystère IV aircraft struck a radar antenna on the mast of the INS Yaffo (K-42). The aircraft crashed into the sea, and the pilot, Lieutenant David Hochman, was unable to escape and was killed.
- March 7, 1962: Two Supermarine Sea Hurricanes collided during a joint training mission. The pilot, Lieutenant Odded Grover, was killed, but the other pilot ejected and survived.
- May 28, 1969: Lieutenant Chaim Holzman's Dassault Mystère IV caught fire during a flight. Despite the possibility of ejecting, Holzman chose to stay with the aircraft to prevent it from crashing in a populated area of Rehovot, and he perished in the crash.
- November 6, 1973: A Nesher aircraft lost control during a training flight over the Mediterranean Sea. The pilot, Major Uri Frans, ejected, but his body was never found.
- February 29, 1976: A Skyhawk collided head-on with a Fouga Magister aircraft near Masada during training. The pilots of both aircraft—Lieutenant Moshe Garb (Skyhawk) and Lieutenant Menachem Schneider (Fouga)—as well as trainee navigator Sergeant Avi Ashkenazi, were killed.
- February 7, 1977: Lieutenant Dov-Shemshon Cohen died when his Skyhawk crashed into the sea during a training flight.
- January 20, 1981: A Phantom aircraft collided with an F-16 during a training flight prior to the Iraq nuclear reactor strike. The F-16 pilot, Lieutenant Colonel Udi Ben-Amiti, was killed, and the body of the Phantom navigator, Lieutenant Colonel Dan Weiss, was never found.
- May 4, 1981: A Kfir aircraft, piloted by Lieutenant Colonel Yoram Eitan, entered a spin. Despite ejecting, his parachute failed, and he died.
- July 10, 1981: Lieutenant Colonel AmiramKalkman, flying a Kfir aircraft, was forced to eject after a mechanical failure. The malfunction with the ejection seat led to his drowning in the sea.
- May 1, 1983: A Hawk aircraft collided with a Baz aircraft. The Baz, a two-seat F-15, managed to land safely after losing a wing.
- October 5, 1987: Colonel Gil Ivri, son of former IAF commander David Ivri, died when his F-16 aircraft crashed.
- August 15, 1988: Two F-15s collided during a training mission over the Dead Sea. The pilots, Lieutenant Colonel Ehud Falk and Lieutenant Colonel Ram Koller, were killed, and a Bedouin girl was severely injured by debris and became blind.
- February 10, 1991: A F-15C aircraft crashed during a training flight over the sea. Trainee navigator Lieutenant Israel (Rally) Ornstein lost control after entering a jet stream, and his ejection resulted in a fatality due to an oxygen tube malfunction.
- August 10, 1995: A F-15D aircraft collided with a flock of storks during a training flight, causing the engine to malfunction and the aircraft to crash. The pilot, Captain Ronen Lev, and the navigator, Captain Yaron Viyontah, were killed.
- March 1, 1998: A F-15B aircraft, conducting a bombing raid training in the Nablus area, crashed into an antenna on Mount Ebal. Both the pilot, Lieutenant Colonel Uri Kolton, and the navigator, Captain Uri Manor, were killed.March 27, 2000: Lieutenant Colonel Lior Harari and Lieutenant Colonel Yonatan Begin, son of Knesset member Zeev Begin died when their F-16 crashed over the Mediterranean Sea.
- February 24, 2003: A F-16 aircraft crashed during a training flight near Taanakh in the Jenin area. The pilot ejected safely and landed unharmed.
- May 3, 2005: A pair of F-16s made emergency landings at Ramon Airbase after detecting a landing gear issue.
- September 13, 2009: Captain Asaf Ramon, son of astronaut Ilan Ramon, died during a dogfight training mission in southern Mount Hebron.
- November 10, 2010: During a night training in Ramon Crater, Lieutenant Colonel Amichai Itkis and Lieutenant Colonel Emmanuel Levi died when their "Sufa" aircraft crashed.

=== Transport aircraft accidents ===
- April 29, 1964: A Nord aircraft from the Israeli Air Force’s 103 Squadron crashed in the Makhtesh HaGadol. Five crew members and four navigator trainees were killed.
- November 25, 1975: Two Hercules C-130 aircraft from Squadron 131 collided due to navigation errors during Exercise "Shaharit" in Sinai. One aircraft crashed into Jebel Halal, killing 20 crew members and soldiers. The other aircraft was able to climb to safety.

=== Helicopter accidents ===
- S-65 Sea Stallion Accidents: Over the decades, multiple fatal accidents involving S-65 Sea Stallion helicopters occurred, including the tragic 54 soldier deaths in the "N.D" disaster.
- AH-1 Cobra Accidents: Four fatal accidents involving AH-1 Cobra helicopters occurred, including crashes due to technical failure in 1987, 1998, and 2008.
- Bell 212 Accidents: Several Bell 212 helicopter crashes occurred, with one notable accident in 1984 killing five, and others occurring in the years following, involving both training and operational missions.
- Dolphin Helicopter Crash: On September 16, 1996, a Eurocopter HH-65 Dolphin helicopter crashed into the Mediterranean Sea off the coast of Nahariya, killing three crew members.
- Apache Helicopter Crash: On August 7, 2017, an Apache helicopter crashed at Ramon Airbase, killing one pilot and seriously injuring the other.

=== Operational aircraft accidents ===
- Second Lebanon War: During the Second Lebanon War, two Apache helicopters collided, and several others were damaged in the high-altitude, night-flight operations.

=== Training aircraft accidents ===
- February 15, 1960: A Harvard aircraft crashed in the Mediterranean Sea during a navigation training flight. The pilot, trainee Yair Hatibah, went missing.
- May 1965: A Fouga Magister aircraft crashed in Savyon during the pilot's first solo flight. The trainee, David Raanan, was killed.
- March 1, 1998: Another Skyhawk crash took place in the southern region of Mount Hebron during a training exercise, injuring two crew members.
- November 24, 2020: During a routine training flight, a T-6 Texan II aircraft crashed in the Negev desert. Both pilot and trainee were killed.

=== Ground accidents ===
Lod Airport Collision: In November 1970, two aircraft, a Boeing 707 and a Stratocruiser, collided on the ground at Lod Airport during an exercise. The crash resulted in the death of the ground crew and the destruction of both aircraft.
