= List of aviation shootdowns and accidents during the Yugoslav Wars =

This is a list of aviation shootdowns accidents, and incidents during the Yugoslav Wars. It includes helicopters, fixed-wing aircraft and unmanned aircraft losses from the Ten-Day War (1991), the Croatian War of Independence (1991–1995), the Bosnian War (1992–1995), the Insurgency in Kosovo (1995–1998), the Kosovo War (1998–1999), and the Insurgency in Macedonia (2001).

== Ten-Day War (1991) ==
- 27 June 1991 – A Yugoslav Air Force SOKO HO-42 (licensed-built Aérospatiale Gazelle) was shot down over Ljubljana by Slovenian forces using a Strela-2M MANPADS while delivering breads to a besieged Yugoslav Army barracks.
- 27 June 1991 – A Yugoslav Air Force Mi-8T was shot by small arms and later downed with a Strela-2M MANPADS near Ig. Three crew died.

== Croatian War of Independence (1991–1995) ==
- (Croatia) (2) 15 September 1991 – Two An-2R (registration YU-BBN and YU-BOZ) of Privredna Avijacija Osijek were damaged beyond repair by an airstrike at Varaždin Airport.
- (Croatia) (2) 19 September 1991 – Two An-2R (registration YU-BHU and YU-BOC) of Privredna Avijacija Osijek were damaged beyond repair by an airstrike at Osijek Airport.
- 19 September 1991 – A Yugoslav NJ-22 Orao was hit by a Strela-2M MANPADS over Đakovo and crashed near Ferkusevac. The pilot, Lt. Col. Muse Begić, ejected and was taken prisoner.
- 4 October 1991 – A Yugoslav Mi-8T was damaged by Croatian anti-aircraft guns near Donji Andrijevci and crash-landed in Bosnia. Three crew members and four passengers were captured by Croatian forces.
- 5 October 1991 – A Yugoslav SOKO HO-42 was shot down near Konavle.
- 9 November 1991 – A Croatian An-2R (former YU-BKB) crashed during take off from Đakovo. All five crew survived.
- (2) 15 November 1991 – Croatian forces claimed their anti-aircraft artillery shot down two Yugoslav J-21 Jastreb ground-attack aircraft (one confirmed) during the Battle of the Dalmatian Channels.
- 2 December 1991 – A Croatian An-2R (former YU-BOP) was shot down near Vinkovci by a 2K12 Kub (NATO: SA-6 Gainful) air defence battery during a bombing mission. All four crew were killed.
- 7 January 1992 – A Yugoslav MiG-21 shot down an Italian Army Agusta-Bell AB-206L helicopter on an EU mission at Podrute, southwest of Varaždin.
- 14 September 1993 – A Croatian MiG-21 was hit by a Serb 2K12 Kub over Gvozd (then Vrginmost) after a successful strike on Serb positions at Vranovina, south of Topusko. The pilot, Miroslav Peris, was killed in action when his aircraft exploded in flames near Stipan.
- 2 May 1995 – A Croatian MiG-21 piloted by Rudolf Perešin was shot down by Serb anti-aircraft fire while on a ground support mission near Stara Gradiška, in the course of Operation Flash. Perešin was killed in action.

== Bosnian War (1992–1995) ==
- 24 June 1992 – A Croatian MiG-21 was shot down over northern Bosnia while attempting to suppress the shelling of Slavonski Brod. The pilot was killed.
- 17 July 1992 – A Serb Mi-8T was shot at by Croatian forces and crashed near Gradačac. Three crew were killed.
- 3 September 1992 – An Italian Air Force G.222 transport aircraft of the 46ª Brigata Aerea was shot down when approaching Sarajevo airfield, while conducting a United Nations relief mission. It crashed 18 miles (29 km) from the airfield; a NATO rescue mission was aborted when two USMC CH-53 helicopters came under small arms fire. The cause of the crash was determined to be a surface-to-air missile, but it was not clear who fired it. Everyone on board – four Italian crew members and four French passengers – died in the crash.
- 26 March 1993 – An E-2C Hawkeye AWACS aircraft of VAW-124, operating from USS Theodore Roosevelt, crashed over the Adriatic Sea. Five crew were killed.
- 12 April 1993 – A French Air Force Mirage 2000C of the 5e Escadre de Chasse crashed over the Adriatic Sea during aerial refueling. The pilot was rescued.
- 11 August 1993 – A USAF F-16C of the 23rd Fighter Squadron crashed over the Adriatic Sea due to mechanical failure. The pilot was rescued.
- 12 February 1994 – An F-14B Tomcat of the VF-103 crashed into the Adriatic Sea after a mid-air collision with an F/A-18C Hornet, both aircraft were operating from USS Saratoga. The F-14B crew were rescued, while the F/A-18C was able to land in Italy.
- 16 February 1994 – A USAF F-16C of the 526th Fighter Squadron crashed at Portorož in Slovenia due to engine failure. The pilot was rescued.
- (4) 28 February 1994 – Banja Luka incident: four USAF F-16s shot down four Serb J-21 Jastrebs after the latter bombed a Bosnian ammunition factory in Novi Travnik, in violation of the no-fly zone established by NATO.
- 27 March 1994 – A French Naval Aviation Super Étendard of the Flottille 11F, operating from aircraft carrier Clemenceau, crashed over the Adriatic Sea. The pilot was rescued.
- 16 April 1994 – A Sea Harrier FRS.1 of 801 Naval Air Squadron, operating from the aircraft carrier HMS Ark Royal, was brought down by an Igla-1 surface-to-air missile, fired by the Army of Republika Srpska while attempting to bomb two Bosnian Serb tanks over Gorazde. The pilot, Lieutenant Nick Richardson, ejected and landed in ARBiH-controlled territory.
- 24 April 1994 – An F/A-18C Hornet of the VFA-83, operating from USS Saratoga, crashed over the Adriatic Sea. The pilot was killed.
- 31 July 1994 – An Antonov An-26B registration UR-26207 of Air Ukraine, operating on behalf of the United Nations, was shot down by ground fire and crashed near Saborsko, Croatia. All seven people aboard were killed.
- 19 November 1994 – A J-22 Orao of the Republika Srpska Air Force crashed near Cazin. The pilot died.
- / (3) 3 December 1994 – An ARBiH Mi-8MTV-1 flying towards the Bihać pocket crashed on takeoff at Lučko Airfield near Zagreb. There were no fatalities. Two other Mi-8MTV-1 owned by the ARBiH and Croatian Air Force were damaged beyond repair in the crash.
- 15 December 1994 – A Sea Harrier FRS.1 of the 800 Naval Air Squadron, operating from the aircraft carrier HMS Invincible, crashed over the Adriatic Sea. The pilot was rescued.
- (Belarus) 31 December 1994 – An Il-76TD registration EW-76836 of Bel-Air Belarusian Airlines overran the runway during bad weather at Sarajevo Airport and was damaged beyond repair. No casualties.
- 26 January 1995 – A USAF F-16C of 510th Fighter Squadron crashed over the Adriatic Sea. The pilot died.
- 7 May 1995 – An ARBiH Mi-8 on a medical evacuation flight from Srebrenica to Živinice was shot down by Bosnian Serb air defenses near Žepa, leaving 12 dead and 10 injured.
- 28 May 1995 – An ARBiH Mi-8 carrying Bosnian foreign minister Irfan Ljubijankić was shot down by a Bosnian Serb 2K12 Kub air defence battery near Cetingrad, at the Bosnia–Croatia border, killing all seven crew on board.
- 2 June 1995 – A USAF F-16C of 512th Fighter Squadron piloted by Captain Scott O’Grady was shot down by a Serb 2K12 Kub. The pilot was rescued by the US Marine Corps seven days later.
- 10 June 1995 – A Croatian Mil Mi-24V was destroyed in a crash near Drvar, northwestern Bosnia. The aircraft's engine and some other components were salvaged.
- 21 June 1995 – A Jaguar GR.1 of the No. 54 Squadron RAF crashed over the Adriatic Sea due to engine failure. The pilot was rescued.
- 11 August 1995 – A USAF RQ-1 Predator s/n 94-3008 was shot down over Bosnia.
- 14 August 1995 – A USAF RQ-1 Predator s/n 94-3002 crashed in Bosnia due to engine sensor failure.
- 14 August 1995 – A Lynx AH Mk.7 helicopter of the 3 Regiment Army Air Corps crashed over the Adriatic Sea during a training mission. Four crew killed and one rescued.
- 22 August 1995 – An ARBiH Mi-8T helicopter crashed near Goražde in eastern Bosnia.
- 29 August 1995 – A USAF U-2R of the 9th Reconnaissance Wing crashed during take off at RAF Fairford, United Kingdom. The pilot was killed. The aircraft was scheduled to overfly Bosnia for a reconnaissance mission.
- 30 August 1995 – A French Air Force Mirage 2000N-K2 of the Escadron de Chasse 2/3 Champagne was shot down over Bosnia by a 9K38 Igla MANPADS, fired by air defence units of Army of Republika Srpska during Operation Deliberate Force. Both pilots were captured by Serbian forces.
- 8 September 1995 – A Croatian Mil Mi-24V was destroyed between Glamoč and Šipovo in northwestern Bosnia, though it is disputed whether it was because of an accident or due to hostile fire.

== Insurgency in Kosovo and Kosovo War (1995–1999) ==
=== Insurgency in Kosovo (1995–1999) ===
- 1 December 1997 – The Kosovo Liberation Army claimed to have shot down a Yugoslav Cessna 310 near Pristina using Strela-2M MANPADS. Local observers disputed this claim and attributed the crash to bad weather.

=== NATO bombing of Yugoslavia (1999) ===
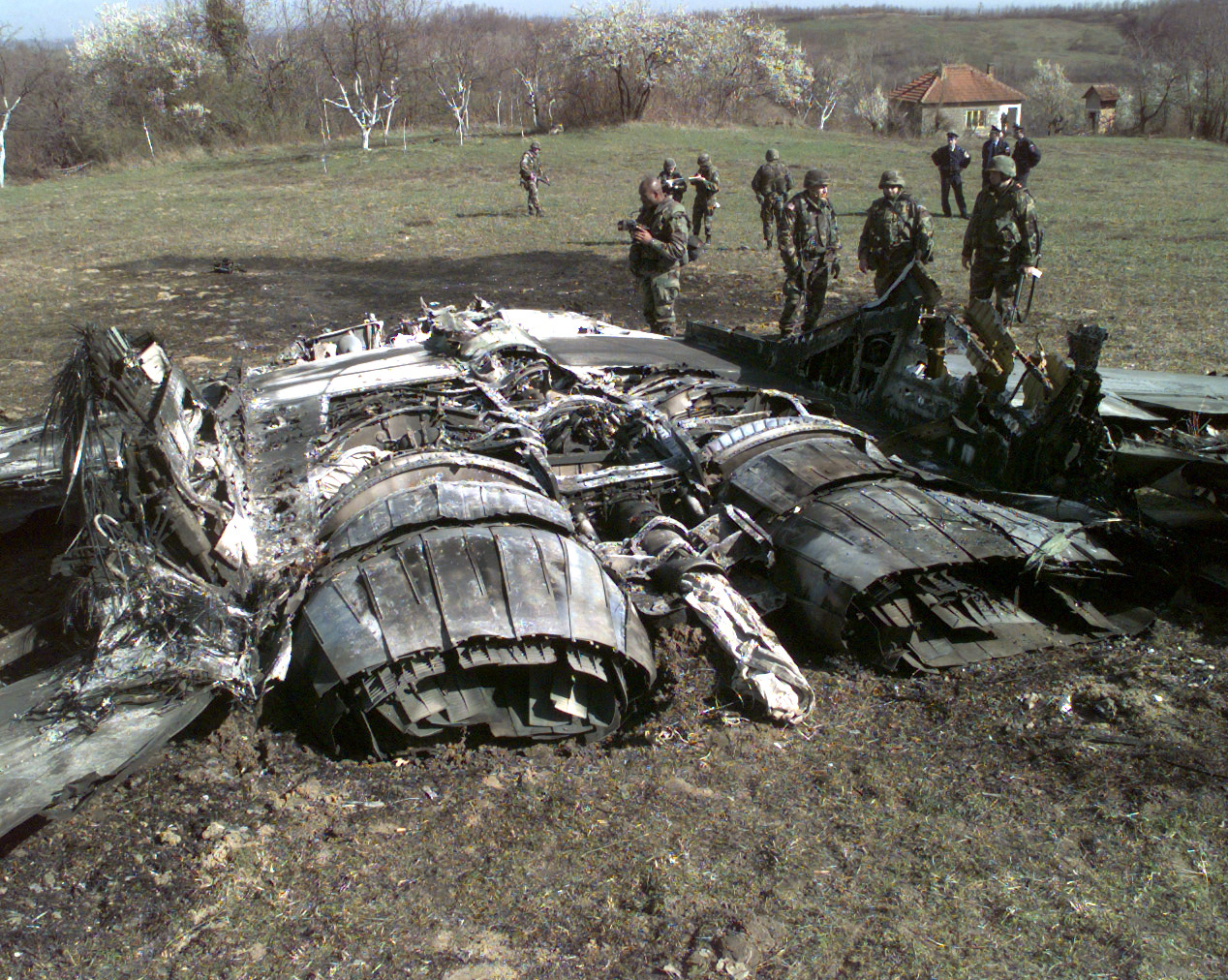
The remains of a Yugoslav MiG-29 shot down over eastern Bosnia. Photograph taken 27 March 1999

- (2) 24 March 1999 – Two Yugoslav Air Force MiG-29 were shot down near Belgrade and over Kosovo by two USAF F-15C with AIM-120 AMRAAM missiles.
- 24 March 1999 – A Royal Netherlands Air Force F-16AM J-063 flown by Major Peter Tankink shot down a Yugoslav MiG-29, flown by Lt. Col. Milutinović, with an AMRAAM missile. The pilot of the stricken jet ejected safely. This marked the first air-to-air kill made by a Dutch fighter since World War 2.
- 24 March 1999 – A Yugoslav J-22 Orao crashed into a hillside upon returning from a combat sortie on the first night of the conflict with NATO. The pilot, Lt. Col. Života Đurić, was killed.
- (2) 26 March 1999 – Two Yugoslav MiG-29s were shot down by two USAF F-15C with AMRAAM missiles near Tuzla, Bosnia.

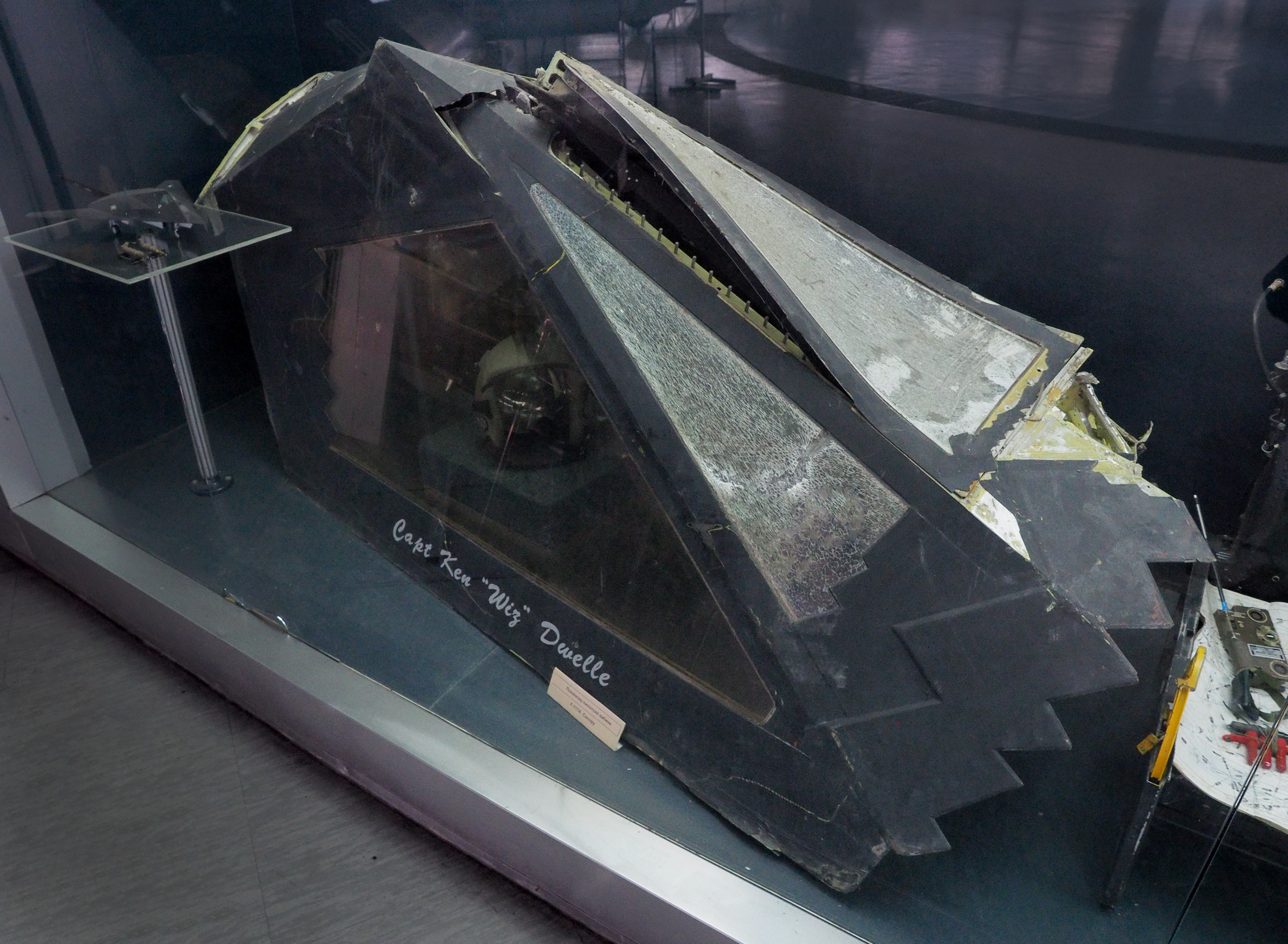
The canopy of the USAF F-117A Nighthawk stealth bomber shot down on 27 March 1999 on display at the Yugoslav Aeronautical Museum

- 27 March 1999 – 1999 F-117A shoot-down: An American F-117A Nighthawk stealth bomber was shot down over Belgrade by a Soviet made S-125E Neva (NATO: SA-3 Goa). The pilot ejected safely and the plane's wreckage was recovered by Serbian special forces. It remains the only stealth aircraft ever to be shot down by a surface-to-air missile.
- 17 April 1999 – A USAF RQ-1 Predator s/n 95-3017 was lost over Bosnia.
- 26 April 1999 – A US Army AH-64A Apache attack helicopter crashed in northern Albania, injuring both crew.
- 2 May 1999 – A USAF F-16CG was shot down by an S-125 Neva air defence system near Nakučani in western Serbia. Its pilot, Lt. Col. David Goldfein, 555th Fighter Squadron commander, managed to eject and was later rescued in a combat search-and-rescue (CSAR) mission. The remains of this aircraft are on display in the Yugoslav Aeronautical Museum, Belgrade International Airport.
- 2 May 1999 – A US Marine Corps McDonnell Douglas AV-8B Harrier II of VMA-231 crashed in the Adriatic Sea during final approach to USS Kearsarge. The pilot ejected safely.
- 4 May 1999 – A lone Yugoslav MiG-29 flown by Lt. Col. Milenko Pavlović attempted to intercept a large NATO formation that was returning to base, having just bombed the pilot's hometown Valjevo. It was engaged by a pair of USAF F-16CJs from the 78th Fighter Squadron, and shot down with an AMRAAM, killing the pilot. The falling wreckage was also hit by a Strela-2M mistakenly fired by the Yugoslav Army.
- 5 May 1999 – A US Army AH-64A Apache attack helicopter crashed in northern Albania, killing both crew.
- 13 May 1999 – A USAF RQ-1 Predator s/n 95-3019 was lost over Kosovo.
- 19 May 1999 – A USAF RQ-1 Predator s/n 95-3021 was lost over Kosovo.
- 11 June 1999 – A Lockheed Hercules C.1 of the No. 47 Squadron RAF with 9 crew members aboard crashed during a night takeoff at Kukës air base in Kukës, northern Albania. Although no crew were injured, much of the aircraft was destroyed.
- unknown date 1999 – A US Army RQ-5 Hunter was shot down by a Yugoslav Mi-8 using its door gunner's 7.62 mm machine gun. It was the first RQ-5 loss during the campaign.

== Insurgency in Macedonia (2001) ==
- 17 March 2001 – A Macedonian Mi-17's rotor blades struck a pole at Popova Šapka and crashed. A crew member was killed, two seriously injured and 19 passengers has minor injuries.

== See also ==
- List of aircraft shootdowns
