= List of accidents and incidents involving the Lockheed Martin F-35 Lightning II =

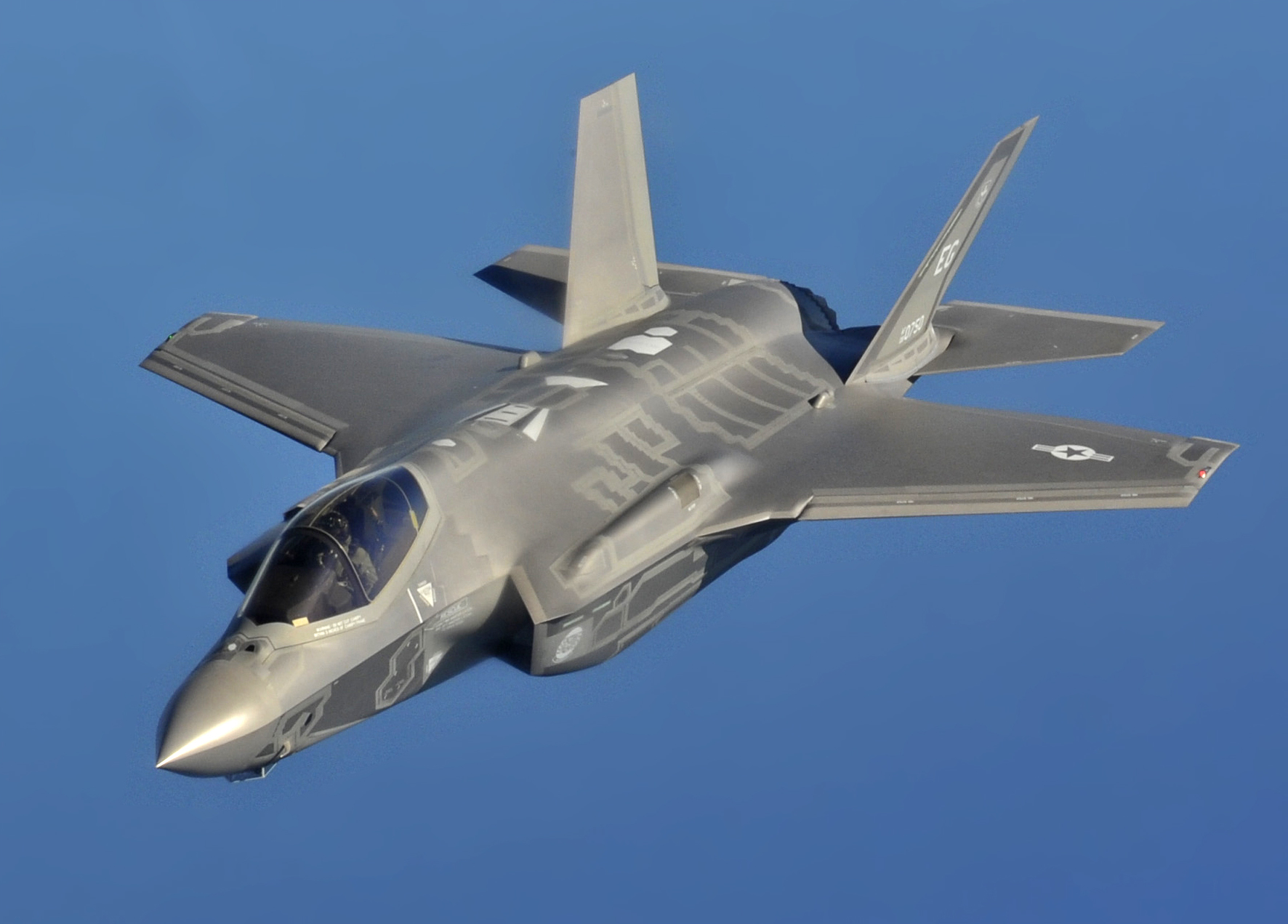
A U.S. Air Force F-35A Lightning II in flight.

This list of accidents and incidents involving Lockheed Martin F-35 Lightning II aircraft includes events that resulted in loss of life, severe injuries, or damaged an aircraft beyond repair. The incidents have led both to concerns about safety and to analyses that indicate that the F-35 is a relatively safe military aircraft to fly.

== 2010 to 2019 ==
=== 2014 ===
- On 23 June 2014, an F-35A's (tail number 10-5015) engine caught fire at Eglin AFB. The pilot escaped unharmed, while the aircraft sustained an estimated US$50 million in damage. The Air Force halted F-35 flights on 3 July and resumed them on 15 July with flight envelope restrictions. In June 2015, the USAF Air Education and Training Command (AETC)'s official report attributed the failure to the third-stage rotor of the engine's fan module, pieces of which cut through the fan case and upper fuselage. Pratt & Whitney applied an extended "rub-in" to increase the gap between the second stator and the third rotor integral arm seal, as well as design alterations to pre-trench the stator by early 2016.

=== 2016 ===
- On 23 September 2016, an Air Force F-35A (tail number 12-5052) was severely damaged in a fire on the flightline at Mountain Home AFB in Idaho. The airframe was stored until repairs were attempted. However, it was determined that the airframe was unrepairable due to the extensive fire damage. Later, the airframe was reassembled using spare parts to be used as an instructional airframe at Hill AFB.
- On 27 October 2016, a Marine Corps F-35B (tail number 168057) suffered an in-flight fire, forcing the pilot to make an emergency landing at MCAS Beaufort, South Carolina. The cause of the fire was determined to be a faulty bracket issue which grazed electrical wiring near the hydraulic lines. This was an issue already known as a potential hazard by officials overseeing the F-35 program. Two years later it was determined that airframe was damaged beyond repair, but was stored pending use as an instructional airframe.

=== 2018 ===
- On 28 September 2018, the first F-35 crash occurred. A USMC F-35B (tail number 168719) crashed near Marine Corps Air Station Beaufort, South Carolina, and the pilot ejected safely. The crash was attributed to a faulty fuel tube; all F-35s were grounded on 11 October pending a fleet-wide inspection of the tubes. The next day, most USAF and USN F-35s returned to flight status following the inspection.

=== 2019 ===
- On 9 April 2019, a JASDF F-35A (tail number 79-8705) attached to Misawa Air Base crashed east of the Aomori Prefecture during a training mission over the Pacific Ocean. Japan grounded its 12 F-35As during the investigation. The US and Japanese navies searched for the missing aircraft and pilot, finding debris soon afterward and recovered the pilot's remains in June. Though there was speculation that China or Russia might attempt to salvage the aircraft, the Japanese Defense Ministry reported that there had been no "reported activities" from either country. The pilot had radioed his intention to abort the drill before disappearing. Though the pilot was apparently conscious and responsive until 15 seconds before crashing, he sent no distress signal nor attempted any recovery maneuvers as he descended at a rapid rate. The accident report attributed the cause to the pilot's spatial disorientation.

== 2020–present ==
=== 2020 ===
- On 19 May 2020, a USAF F-35A (tail number 12-5053) from the 58th Fighter Squadron crashed while landing at Eglin AFB. The pilot ejected and was rescued in stable condition. The accident was attributed to a combination of pilot error induced by fatigue, a design issue with the oxygen system, the aircraft's complex and distracting nature, a malfunctioning head-mounted display, and an unresponsive flight control system.
- On 29 September 2020, a USMC F-35B (tail number 169294) crashed in Imperial County, California, after colliding with a Marine Corps KC-130 during air-to-air refuelling. The F-35B pilot was injured in the ejection, and the KC-130 crash-landed in a field without deploying its landing gear.

=== 2021 ===
- On 17 November 2021, a Royal Air Force 617 Squadron F-35B (tail number ZM152) crashed during routine operations in the Mediterranean. The pilot was safely recovered to HMS Queen Elizabeth. The wreckage, including all security sensitive equipment, was largely recovered with the assistance of U.S. and Italian forces. The crash was determined to have been caused by an engine-blanking plug left in the intake.

=== 2022 ===
- On 4 January 2022, a South Korean Air Force F-35A (tail number 20-017) made a belly landing after all systems failed except the flight controls and the engine. The pilot heard a series of bangs during low-altitude flight, and various systems stopped working. The control tower suggested that the pilot eject, but he managed to land the plane without deploying the landing gear, walking away uninjured.
- On 24 January 2022, a USN F-35C (tail number 169304) with VFA-147 suffered a ramp strike while landing on the USS Carl Vinson (CVN-70) and was lost overboard in the South China Sea. Seven crew members were injured, while the pilot ejected safely and was recovered from the water. On 2 March 2022, the aircraft was recovered from a depth of about 12,400 ft (3,780 m) with the aid of a remotely operated vehicle (ROV) and DSCV Picasso, a deep-diving ship.
- On 19 October 2022, an F-35A (tail number 15-5197) crashed at the north end of the runway at Hill Air Force Base in Utah. The pilot safely ejected and was unharmed. The crash was caused by errors in the air data system from the wake turbulence of a preceding aircraft, which resulted in several rapid transitions between the primary and backup flight-conditions data sources. These rapid transitions caused the accumulation of reset values, leading the flight control laws to operate on inaccurate flight-conditions data, leading to departure from controlled flight.
- On 15 December 2022, an F-35B (tail number 170061) crashed during a failed vertical landing at Naval Air Station Joint Reserve Base Fort Worth in Texas. The government test pilot ejected on the ground and was not seriously injured. The aircraft was undergoing production test flying and had not yet been delivered by the manufacturer to the U.S. military.

=== 2023 ===
- On 17 September 2023, an F-35B (tail number 169591) crashed after the pilot ejected from his jet over North Charleston, South Carolina following a mishap during a training flight out of MCAS Beaufort. While the pilot was unharmed, the fighter was not located for about 30 hours. The fighter's wreckage was found on the evening of 18 September 2023.

=== 2024 ===
- On 28 May 2024, a developmental test F-35B (tail number 170067) crashed shortly after takeoff from Kirtland Air Force Base in New Mexico. The pilot ejected and was reportedly injured.

=== 2025 ===
- On 28 January 2025, an F-35A (tail number 19-5535) crashed at Eielson Air Force Base 20 miles south of Fairbanks in interior Alaska. The pilot was reported uninjured. On 26 August 2025 an Air Force investigation revealed that the pilot spent 50 minutes on a conference call with Lockheed Martin engineers starting soon after take-off. Freezing temperatures (-18C) had caused the hydraulic fluid to freeze and rupture the hydraulic lines including those to the landing gear. One third of the hydraulic systems in both the nose and the right main landing gear was found to have been contaminated with water. The US Air Force's accident investigation board concluded that a lack of oversight for the distribution of the hydraulic fluid, inadequate aircraft hydraulics servicing procedures, and the crew's decision-making, including the engineers on the call, all contributed to the crash.
- On 30 July 2025, A US Navy F-35C fighter jet assigned to Strike Fighter Squadron 125, known as the “Rough Raiders,” crashed in central California near Naval Air Station Lemoore, according to an US Navy press statement. The pilot ejected safely while the cause of the crash, which occurred around 6:30 pm, is being investigated.

=== 2026 ===
- On 19 March 2026, during the 2026 Iran war, a US F-35 flying a combat mission over Iran was forced to make an emergency landing at a regional air base. It was the first time an F-35 sustained damage from enemy fire since it was deployed in combat in 2018. It was also the first Iranian interception of a US aircraft. A US Central Command spokesman said the aircraft "landed safely, and the pilot is in stable condition". The Islamic Revolutionary Guard Corps (IRGC) said it had "seriously damaged" the F-35 over central Iran. Air & Space Forces Magazine reported the aircraft had taken ground fire, and that the pilot had suffered shrapnel wounds. CNN reported damage from "what is believed to be Iranian fire". A US National Public Radio (NPR) correspondent reported that the plane had made a "hard landing" and would not return to service soon. Iran's Tasnim News Agency released a video purporting to show the interception, perhaps by a low-quality infrared search and track system, although some analysts suspect a deepfake. A Ukrainian news agency said IRGC's Raad air defense system could have hit the aircraft, while Chinese analysts told the South China Morning Post that the damage was likely caused by a ground-launched adapted air-to-air missile, such as the R-27T, rather than a larger surface-to-air missile such as Iran's S-300.
- On 31 March 2026, a US F-35A was lost in the Nevada Test and Training Range in Southern Nevada, while on a training mission from Nellis Air Force Base. The pilot ejected and sustained only minor injuries.
- On 31 July 2026, a US F-35B crashed and was destroyed at Marine Corps Air Station Miramar in San Diego. The pilot ejected safely.
