= List of aviation incidents during the Saudi-led intervention in the Yemeni civil war =

Beginning in 2015, Saudi Arabia led a coalition of forces to intervene in the civil war in Yemen. Multiple events let to the change of the involved parties within the coalition. Later the US played a role during the Red Sea crisis. Different types of airframes like fixed-wing aircraft, helicopters and drones have been lost due to accident or enemy action in the course of the war.

== 2015 ==
- 25 March 2015 – A Yemeni Airforce CASA CN-235M-300 cargo plane is destroyed in the ground at Al-Dulaimi Air Base, Sanaa International Airport by the Saudi led Coalition, during the opening day of Operation Decisive Storm.
- 25 March 2015 – A Yemeni Airforce Beechcraft Super King Air utility aircraft is destroyed at Al-Dulaimi Air Base by the Saudi led Coalition in the same incident.
- (2) 25 March 2015 – Two Yemeni Airforce Huey Bell 214 helicopters parked at Al-Dulaimi Air Base were destroyed by the Saudi led Coalition, during the opening day of Operation Decisive Storm.
- (5) 25 March 2015 – Saudi Coalition strikes destroyed Yemeni Airforce aircraft in their hangars at Sanaa International Airport and Al Anad Air Base, including four Su-22 ground attack fighters and one Mi-8 helicopter, during the opening hours of Operation Decisive Storm.
- 26 March 2015 – During the opening strikes, a Royal Saudi Air Force F-15S crashed into the Gulf of Aden after circling around over the sea; its two pilots ejected safely and were recovered from the sea by a US Air Force HH-60G rescue helicopter. Arab coalition reports stated enemy fire did not cause the crash, while Houthi and Iranian sources stated they shot it down.
- 27 March 2015 – During the opening days of Operation Decisive Storm, Houthi forces said they shot down a Sudanese Air Force Su-24 in Yemen using a SA-2 missile. Houthis published photos of a captured Sudanese pilot and the aircraft wreckage.
- (Yemen) late March 2015 – An Ilyushin Il-76TD cargo aircraft registration 7O-ADO of Barash Aviation was destroyed by Saudi Coalition strikes in Sanaa International Airport.
- (2) 28 April 2015 – Two Yemeni Airforce MiG-29 were destroyed in Sanna Airport by Saudi Coalition airstrikes.
- (Yemen) 28 April 2015 – A Bombardier CRJ702ER airliner registration 7O-FAA of Felix Airways was destroyed by Saudi Coalition strikes at Sanaa International Airport.
- 4 May 2015 – A Houthi–Saleh-led Government Ilyushin Il-76TD cargo plane was destroyed by Saudi Coalition strikes in Sanaa International Airport.
- 7 May 2015 – Damaged – A Saudi Arabian Army Aviation Boeing AH-64 Apache helicopter made an emergency landing just inside Yemeni territory in Najran because of a technical failure. The Houthis claimed they forced the helicopter down. The helicopter suffered minor damage according to Saudi officials.
- 9 May 2015 – Claim – The Houthis claimed they shot down a Saudi Arabian Army Aviation Boeing AH-64 Apache helicopter in Baqem district in Sa'ada, capturing both pilots.
- 10 May 2015 – At 18:00 local time, a Royal Moroccan Air Force F-16C Block 52, serial number 08-8008, crashed in Sa'ada, while performing a mission as part of the Saudi-led intervention in Yemen. The pilot of a second F-16 said he did not see any ejection. Originally missing for several hours, on 11 May, Houthi rebels showed the crash site, located near Nushoor, Sa'ada. They claimed they shot the jet down with anti-aircraft artillery fire while the pilot was killed in the crash. Other sources claim the F-16 was shot down by anti-aircraft guns or MANPADS.
- 3 August 2015 – A Saudi Arabian Seeker 400 is shot down in Al-Buqa, Saada.
- 5 August 2015 – The Houthis claimed they shot down a Saudi Arabian Army Aviation Boeing AH-64 Apache helicopter in the western province of Hajjah. Saudi Arabian press denied the claim adding that the airframe made an emergency landing due to a technical issue.
- 21 August 2015 – A Saudi Arabian Army Aviation Boeing AH-64 Apache helicopter was lost near the Tawal border crossing in Jizan Region, both pilots were killed. According to Saudi forces the chopper crashed, but according to Yemeni reports it was shot down.
- 21 August 2015 – Houthi forces shot down a Schiebel Camcopter S-100 operated by the United Arab Emirates Army in Dhubab.
- 20 September 2015 – A Saudi Arabian Army Aviation Boeing AH-64 Apache helicopter was shot down in Safir, Marib Governorate.
- 26 September 2015 – Claim – The Houthis claimed they shot down a Saudi Arabian Army Aviation Boeing AH-64 Apache helicopter in Jizan Region. No other sources confirmed or denied the claim.
- 25 October 2015 – Houthi forces shot down another Schiebel Camcopter S-100 operated by the United Arab Emirates Army in Al-Abdiyah.
- 30 December 2015 – An RBAF F-16C was lost in Jizan Region, Saudi Arabia. A military source reported the pilot ejected and survived the crash. The F-16 was already in flames before hitting the ground as recorded on video. The loss was initially attributed to a technical malfunction, but other sources claim the F-16 was instead shot down by anti-aircraft guns or MANPADS.

== 2016 ==
- 19 January 2016 – A US MQ-1 drone was shot down over Saana, Yemen.
- 3 February 2016 – Houthi forces shot down a Selex ES Falco operated by the United Arab Emirates Army in Hajjah, northeastern Yemen.
- 27 February 2016 – Houthi forces announce the destruction of a Schiebel Camcopter S-100 operated by the United Arab Emirates Army in Dhubab.
- 14 March 2016 – A UAEAF Dassault Mirage 2000-9D crashed in the southern Yemeni city of Aden during a combat operation in the early morning hours, killing its two pilots. The coalition claimed the Mirage crashed due to a technical fault. Other sources reported the Mirage 2000-9D was shot down while flying low by Yemeni Al-Qaeda militants using a Strela-2 MANPADS.
- 13 June 2016 – A UAEAF NSA 407MRH helicopter crashed with both pilots reported killed in the crash.
- 25 July 2016 – One Saudi Arabian Army Aviation Boeing AH-64 Apache crashed in Marib, killing both pilots.
- 16 August 2016 – A Saudi Arabian Seeker 400 is shot down in Kitaf, Saada.
- 26 September 2016 – A UAEAF CAIG Wing Loong I is shot down by Houthi fighters, photos are displayed of the drone wreckage.

== 2017 ==
- 29 January 2017 – During the US Raid on Yakla on al-Qaeda in the Arabian Peninsula militants, a Bell Boeing V-22 Osprey crash-landed and was subsequently destroyed by US fire to avoid falling in enemy hands.
- 30 January 2017 – Damaged – Houthi rebels attacked a Saudi Al-Madinah frigate off the Al-Hudaydah coast. A Royal Saudi Naval Aviation SA 365 helicopter was damaged in the attack.
- 14 February 2017 – A United Arab Emirates UAV MQ-1B was shot down by Houthi anti-aircraft missile over Marib province.
- 24 February 2017 – A Royal Jordanian Air Force F-16 crashed in Najran, Saudi Arabia. A military source reported the pilot survived the crash. Houthis claimed to have shot down the aircraft.
- 16 March 2017 – A Saudi Arabian Army Aviation Boeing AH-64 Apache was shot down by Houthi rebels.
- 18 April 2017 – A Saudi Arabian Army Aviation Sikorsky UH-60L Black Hawk helicopter crashed in Marib killing 12 soldiers on board. According to the Yemeni Ministry of Defense of the Hadi led Government, the helicopter was shot down by mistake after it was "misread" by the coalition air defenses.
- 21 June 2017 – Houthi forces shot down a Schiebel Camcopter S-100 operated by the United Arab Emirates Army in Dhubab, Taiz.
- 11 August 2017 – A UAEAF Sikorsky UH-60M Black Hawk helicopter crashed due to a technical problem in Shabwa, with 4 soldiers killed and 3 injured.
- 15 August 2017 – A Saudi Arabian Seeker 400 drone is shot down in Al-Buqa, Najran.
- 25 August 2017 – A United States Army Aviation Branch Sikorsky MH-60M Black Hawk, belonging to the 160th SOAR (A) was conducting hoist training a few feet above the water when it crashed 20 miles off the southern coast of Yemen at approx 7:00 p.m. local time. One crew member died while the other five were recovered.
- 11 September 2017 – A UAEAF IOMAX AT-802U crashed in Yemen, killing the pilot.
- 13 September 2017 – An RSAF Eurofighter Typhoon involved in a close air support mission against Houthi fighters over Yemen crashed into a mountain in Al Wade’a district, reportedly due to a technical malfunction. The pilot died in the crash.
- 1 October 2017 – US Central Command stated a MQ-9 Reaper was shot down by Houthi air defense systems over Sanaa in western Yemen the previous day. The aircraft took off from Chabelley Airport in Djibouti and was armed.
- 17 October 2017 – A UAEAF Boeing AH-64 Apache crashed due to technical failure in Yemen resulting in the death of 2 Emirati pilots.

== 2018 ==
- 7 January 2018 – Houthi rebels claimed to have shot down a Saudi fighter which was conducting air raids over northern Yemen, releasing Optical Infrared camera footage of a fighter being targeted by a missile. Later Houthis published footage of the remains of a Panavia Tornado which crashed in Saada. Saudi media reported the downed aircraft was a Panavia Tornado of the Saudi Royal Air Force which was on a combat mission in the skies over Saada province in northern Yemen, but that it was lost for 'technical reasons' and that both crew members were rescued.
- 8 January 2018 – Damaged – An RSAF aircraft was hit by a Houthi surface-to-air missile. Houthis released another video in a separate claim a day before showing what appeared to be an F-15 increasing speed and releasing decoy flares before being struck by a projectile and apparently suffering major damage. On 9 January 2018, Houthi media channel Al-Masirah announced the F-15 was damaged.
- 21 March 2018 – Damaged or Destroyed– Houthi rebels claimed to have hit and shot down an RSAF F-15 in Saada province. Saudi official sources confirmed the incident reporting that it happened at 3:48 pm local time after a surface-to-air defense missile was launched at the fighter, also indicating the fighter returned to its air base and landed safely.
- 31 May 2018 – A Saudi Arabian Army Aviation Boeing AH-64 Apache helicopter was reportedly shot down by Houthi fighters according to the Yemeni Defense Ministry, both crewmen died in the crash.
- 12 July 2018 – A Saudi Arabian Royal Air Force Panavia Tornado crashed in the Asir region after returning from Saada, Yemen; a technical malfunction was the reason of the crash.
- 12 July 2018 – Houthi rebels shot down an armed Saudi Arabian CH-4B drone near Asir border.
- 24 July 2018 – (2) Houthi Qasef-1 drones carrying explosives are shot down by the UAE armed forces. One was headed to Al Mokha and the other to Al Khokha in Hodeidah province.
- 8 August 2018 – Houthi rebels shot down an armed Saudi Arabian CH-4B drone near the Tuwal border crossing.
- 2 September 2018 – Houthi forces shot down a Schiebel Camcopter S-100 operated by the United Arab Emirates Army in Al-Jah.
- 14 September 2018 – A Saudi Arabian Army Aviation Boeing AH-64 Apache helicopter crashed following technical issues while it was on a reconnaissance mission the Yemeni eastern province of al-Mahrah. Both pilots died.
- 26 November 2018 – Houthi forces shot down a UAE Denel Dynamics Seeker 400 drone in Hudaydah.
- 23 December 2018 – Houthi rebels shot down a Saudi Arabian CH-4 drone in Saada province, northern Yemen and displayed the wreckage of the drone.

== 2019 ==
- 12 February 2019 – Houthi forces shot down a Saudi Arabian EMT Luna X-2000 drone near the Saudi Border.
- 23 March 2019 – Houthis announced the shooting down of a US MQ-1 drone over Saana, Yemen, and displayed images of the wreckage on social media.
- 11 April 2019 – A Saudi Arabian CH-4 drone is lost over Yemen, according to Houthi media the Saudi drone was shot down by friendly fire.
- 19 April 2019 – The Houthis published a video of the downing and the crash site of a UAEAF CAIG Wing Loong I acting for Saudi-led intervention over Saada district. It was probably shot down with a R-73 or R-27T missile.
- 14 May 2019 – A United Arab Emirates MQ-1 Predator was shot down by Houthi fire during a night flight in Saana, Houthi fighters used an air-to-air missile (R-27T or R-73) with a modified land operator device.
- 26 May 2019 – Saudi air defense intercepted a Houthi drone targeting King Abdullah bin Abdulaziz Airport in Jizan.
- 2 June 2019 – Houthi forces shot down a Schiebel Camcopter S-100 operated by the United Arab Emirates Army in Hays, Hudaydah.
- 6 June 2019 – Houthis shot down a US MQ-9 Reaper drone over Yemen, using a SA-6 missile. CENTCOM asserted the event “indicated an improvement over previous Houthi capability,” and that it was enabled with Iranian assistance.
- 15 July 2019 – (2) Houthi drones targeting Jizan and Abha airports in Saudi Arabia are intercepted by the coalition.
- 21 August 2019 – Houthis shot down another US MQ-9 Reaper unarmed drone over Dhamar, Yemen. The claim was corroborated by two US officials.
- 1 November 2019 – Houthi rebels shot down a Schiebel Camcopter S-100 drone over al-Hudaydah.
- / 1 November 2019 – Claim – A US-made ScanEagle drone is reported shot down by Houthi rebels in Asir province, Yemen.
- 29 November 2019 – A Saudi Arabian Army Aviation AH-64 Apache was shot down by Houthi rebels using a surface-to-air missile. A video released by the Houthis showed a missile hit on a patrolling Apache and its crash. Both pilots died. However, neither Yemen nor Iran had any 9K33 Osa missiles in their armed forces, while Houthi operated systems are based on the Soviet-made surface-to-air 2K12 Kub which employs a two-stage rocket engine and the air-to-air missiles R-73 and R-27T which both have a single stage rocket engine.
- 30 November 2019 – The Houthis published photos of the remains of a CAIG Wing Loong I, serial number 20207, indicating it was shot down.
- 31 December 2019 – The Houthis announced their forces shot down two Saudi-led Coalition drones, one in Razih district in Saada and another in the Red Sea port city of Hodeidah. Later, the Houthis published footage of the downing and later recovery of the remains of a Turkish-made Vestel Karayel drone.

== 2020 ==
- 7 January 2020 – The Houthi shot down an armed Saudi Arabian CH-4B drone over Jawf province.
- 5 February 2020 – The Houthi with the help of their Popular Committees shot down a Saudi Arabian "spy drone" in Al Hudaydah. Later a photo of the drone wreck was shown by Houthis.
- 14 February 2020 – In the night of 14 February 2020, a Saudi Panavia Tornado was shot down during close air support mission in support of Saudi allied Yemeni forces in the Yemeni Al Jawf governorate by Houthis. On the day after, the Saudi command confirmed the loss of a Tornado, while video evidence was released showing the downing using a two-stage surface-to-air missile. Both pilots ejected and were captured by Houthis according to the Saudi Coalition.
- 20 February 2020 – Unknown militants shot down a helicopter operated by militia units loyal to the Islah party near the town of Shibam, Hadhramaut governorate.
- (2) 2 July 2020 – Two Houthi Samad-1 drones are shot down by Saudi Arabian F-15 fighters above Yemen. Sources mistakenly identify as the Shahed 129.
- 2 August 2020 – The Houthis said they shot down a US-made drone in Harad province. A video posted by the Houthis showed the remains of a bullet-riddled RQ-20 Puma drone with Saudi Arabian Army markings.
- 22 December 2020 – Houthi rebels shot down a Saudi Arabian CH-4B drone, serial number 20311, in Madghal district, Marib province.

== 2021 ==
- 6 January 2021 – Houthis shoot down a Vestel Karayel drone operated by the Saudi-led Coalition in Al-Jawf province. Houthis published footage of the drone being targeted by a missile and its remains.
- 26 January 2021 – Houthis shoot down a US MQ-1C Gray Eagle in Yemen, later US forces destroyed the wreckage of the drone.
- 12 February 2021 – Houthis intercepted a Saudi Arabian CASC Rainbow CH-4 drone in Meghdal, Marib Governorate, displaying footage of the shotdown.
- 28 February 2021 – Houthis shot down and published video footage of the wreck of a Saudi drone lost over Hays district, Hodeidah province.
- 7 March – Houthi forces shot down a Saudi Coalition Vestel Karayel drone in Yemen. Later publishing footage of the wreckage of the drone.
- (3) 7 March 2021 – During a Houthi attack at several Saudi oil installations, Saudi F-15s claimed several attacking drones were shot down using heat-seeking AIM-9 Sidewinder missiles, with video evidence showing at least two Samad-3 UAVs and one Qasef-2K downed, with other possibly hit by ground-based Hawk and Patriot systems.
- 23 March 2021 – A Houthi spokesman said that Houthi forces shot down a US MQ-9 Reaper drone operating in Marib, however a day later the Houthis published footage of the shootdown depicting a drone resembling a Chinese CH-4 drone currently operated by Saudi Arabia.
- 20 May 2021 – Houthi media announced the downing of a Saudi Coalition Wing Loong II drone in Najran region. Later displaying photos of the wreckage of the downed drone.
- 23 May 2021 – A Saudi Coalition CH-4 drone is shot down by Houthi fighters in Al-Maraziq, Al Jawf Governorate. Later Houthi media wing released a video of the shootdown of the drone.
- / (2) 19–21 June 2021 – Houthi media reported two Saudi-led Coalition drones shot down in Marib governorate. Later publishing video footage of the interception of one ScanEagle drone and the debris of both drones. US officials denied that the downed drones were military assets operated by CENTCOM.
- / 14 August 2021 – A US-made ScanEagle drone is reported shot down by Houthi rebels in Marib, Yemen. Houthis later published photos of the downed drone.
- 13 September 2021 – Houthi media announced the downing of a Saudi Coalition Wing Loong II drone in Kataf area, Saada region, displaying footage of the shootdown.
- / 27 September 2021 – Houthi fighters shot down a US-made Eagle Scan drone in Meghdal region, Marib. Displaying images of the wreck surrounded by its fighters.
- 4 October 2021 – Houthi rebels downed a Saudi Arabian RQ-20 Puma drone in Al-Ghaydah city.
- 6 October 2021 – Houthis media reported the shotdown of a Saudi Arabian CASC Rainbow CH-4 drone in Juba district, southern Marib province by Houthi Air Defenses, later displaying footage of the drone wreck.
- 7 October 2021 – Houthis shot down a US-made RQ-20 Puma drone operated by Saudi Arabian forces in Jizan region. Media close to Houthis published footage of the drone wreck.
- 9 October 2021 – During a Houthi drone and ballistic attack on Jizan international airport, Saudi Air defenses shot down a Houthi Samad-2 suicide drone, displaying photos of the wreckage.
- / 9 November 2021 – Houthi forces reported the interception and shot down of a US-made ScanEagle drone in al-Jubah district, Marib. Later displaying footage of the drone wreckage a day after.
- / 13 November 2021 – Another US-made ScanEagle drone was shot down in Marib. The footage of the drone was displayed later by Houthi officials.
- 1 December 2021 – Houthi forces shot down a CASC Rainbow CH-4 combat drone near al-Amshiyah, Harf Sufyan district, Amran Governorate; and displayed footage of the drone wreck.
- / 4 December 2021 – Houthi forces shot down a US-built ScanEagle in Marib, later publishing a video of the wreckage of the drone.

== 2022 ==
- 11 January 2022 – Houthi forces shot down another UAEAF Wing Loong UCAV in Ain district in Shabwa province. Displaying footage of the interception and the wreckage of the airframe two days after.
- 13 January 2022 – A Houthi Mil Mi-24 attack helicopter was destroyed on the ground by the Saudi-led Coalition in Marib. Footage of the attack is displayed by the Saudi Coalition.
- / 29 January 2022 – Houthi forces said they shot down a US-made ScanEagle from the Saudi-led Coalition in Marib. Later media close to the Houthis displayed footage of the wreck.
- 10 February 2022 – Houthi forces shot down and published the wreckage of a CASC Rainbow CH-4 combat drone operated by the Saudi-led coalition in Haradh district, Hajjah province, western Yemen.
- 25 February 2022 – Houthi forces shot down a UAEAF MQ-1 Predator drone of the Saudi-led Coalition in Al-Jawf province.
- / 26 February 2022 – Houthi forces shot down a US-made ScanEagle from the Saudi-led Coalition in al-Jubah district, Marib. Later publishing footage of the drone wreckage.
- / 28 February 2022 – Houthi air defences shot down a US-made ScanEagle from the Saudi-led Coalition in Hajjah governorate. Later publishing footage of the drone wreckage.
- / 8 March 2022 – Houthi air defences shot down a US-made ScanEagle from the Saudi-led Coalition in Hajjah.
- 5 May 2022 – Houthi forces shot down and published the wreckage of a CASC Rainbow CH-4 combat drone operated by the Saudi-led coalition in Haradh district, Hajjah province, western Yemen.
- 21 May 2022 – A Turkish-made Vestel Karayel drone operated by the Saudi Coalition was shot down by Houthi fighters in Hajjah governorate. Later Houthis released footage of the drone wreck.
- 23 May 2022 – Houthi forces shot down and published the wreckage of a CASC Rainbow CH-4 combat drone operated by the Saudi-led coalition in Sanaa.
- 6 August 2022 – A US RQ-21 drone was shot down by Houthi rebels in Mahesh, eastern Yemen. Media close to Houthis displayed wreckage of the drone.

== 2023 ==
- 8 November 2023 – A US MQ-9 Reaper drone was shot down by Houthi forces, according to US officials the drone was shot down over international waters.

== 2024 ==
- 19 February 2024 – A US MQ-9 Reaper drone was shot down by Houthi forces. Images of the wreckage were published in social media.
- 25 April 2024 – A US MQ-9 Reaper drone over Saada, northern Yemen. Houthi media published footage of the wreckage of the drone.
- 29 April 2024 – Houthis shot down a UAEAF Wing Loong UCAV in Rawdha district, Shabwa province.
- 16 May 2024 – A US MQ-9 Reaper drone was shot down by Houthi forces over Ma'rib Governorate, showing footage of the remains of the drone.
- 20 May 2024 – A US MQ-9 Reaper drone was shot down by Houthi forces over Al Bayda Governorate, Yemen. Media close to Houthis showed IR footage of the interception.
- 29 May 2024 – A US MQ-9 Reaper drone was shot down by Houthi forces over Ma'rib Governorate. Houthis published IR footage of the interception and wreckage of the drone.
- 4 August 2024 – A US MQ-9 Reaper drone was shot down by Houthi forces over Saada Governorate. Yemeni media showed wreckage of the drone.
- 10 September 2024 – A US MQ-9 Reaper drone was shot down by Houthi forces over Saada Governorate. US officials confirmed the loss to ABC News.
- 16 September 2024 – A US MQ-9 Reaper drone was shot down by Houthi forces over Dhamar Governorate. US officials confirmed the loss to ABC News.
- 30 September 2024 – A US MQ-9 Reaper drone was shot down by Houthi forces over Saada Governorate.
- 8 November 2024 – A US MQ-9 Reaper drone was shot down by Houthi forces over Al-Jawf Governorate. Houthi media showed footage of the IR interception of the drone using an Iranian "358" air-defence missile".
- 22 December 2024 – A US Navy F/A-18F was shot down in a friendly fire incident over the Red Sea by the US Navy cruiser USS Gettysburg. Both crew members survived.
- 28 December 2024 – A US MQ-9 Reaper drone was shot down by Houthi forces over Al Bayda Governorate.

== 2025 ==
- 3 March 2025 – A US MQ-9 Reaper drone was shot down by Houthi forces over Al Hudaydah Governorate and crashed into the Red Sea.
- 31 March 2025 – A US MQ-9 Reaper drone was reported shot down by Houthi forces over Marib. Yemeni media affiliated with the Houthis.published video footage of the interception and the wreckage of the drone.
- 3 April 2025 – A US MQ-9 Reaper drone was shot down by Houthi forces over Al-Hudaydah Governorate. Fox News confirmed the loss.
- 9 April 2025 – A US MQ-9 Reaper drone was shot down by Houthi forces over Al-Jawf governorate. Houthi media published footage of the drone wreckage.
- 13 April 2025 – A US MQ-9 Reaper drone was shot down by Houthi forces over Hajjah Governorate.
- 18 April 2025 – A US MQ-9 Reaper drone was lost in Yemen, according to US officials.
- 19 April 2025 – A US MQ-9 Reaper drone was shot down by Houthis in Sanaa govermnorate, Houthi media showed the IR footage interception and the drone wreckage.
- 22 April 2025 – A US MQ-9 Reaper drone was lost in Yemen, according to US officials.
- 28 April 2025 – A US Navy F/A-18E from VFA-136 was lost at sea when it rolled off the deck of the aircraft carrier USS Harry S. Truman after it made a hard turn while under attack by missiles and drones from the Houthis.
- 6 May 2025 – A US Navy F/A-18F was lost at sea on the deck of the USS Harry S. Truman.
- 6 May 2025 – A Yemeni Air Force Ilyushin Il-76TD was destroyed by Israeli strikes in Sanaa airport.
- (Yemen) (4) 6 May 2025 - Four commercial airliners were destroyed by Israeli air strikes on Sanaa International Airport. One Bombardier CRJ200ER 7O-FAJ of Felix Airways, one Airbus A330-202 7O-AFE, and two Airbus A320-233 (7O-AFA and 7O-AFC) of Yemenia Airways.
- (Yemen) 28 May 2025 - An Airbus A320-233 airliner, registration 7O-AFF, of Yemenia Airways was destroyed by an Israeli air strike on Sanaa International Airport.

== 2026 ==
- 10 January 2026 – A US MQ-9 Reaper drone was shot down by Houthi forces over west Yemen.
- 2 March 2026 – A Saudi Arabian Wing Loong II drone, serial number 20103, was shot down by Houthi forces over Al-Maraqasha, Abyan Governorate, western Yemen.
- 18 May 2026 – A US MQ-9A Reaper drone was shot down by Houthi air defences over Marib Governorate, western Yemen.
- 29 May 2026 – A US MQ-9A Reaper drone was shot down by Houthi air defenses over Marib Governorate, western Yemen.
- 26 July 2026 - A Saudi Arabian Bayraktar Akinci combat drone, serial number 20703, was shot down by Houthi Forces over Al-Jawf Governorate.
- 7 September 2026 - A Saudi Arabian CASC CH-4B MALE drone was shot down by Houthi forces over Al-Jawf Governorate.
- 10 September 2026 - A Saudi Arabian Vestel Karayel drone was shot down by Houthi forces over Hajjah province.
- 12 September 2026 - A Saudi Arabian CASC CH-4B MALE combat drone was shot down by Yemeni Government Forces in a friendly fire incident.
- 15 September 2026 - A Saudi Arabian Boeing F-15SA, serial number 5539, was shot down over the province of Marib by Houthi Forces. The pilots were unaccounted for.
- 17 September 2026 – Damaged – The Italian Defence Minister, Guido Crosetto, reported that an Eurofighter Typhoon was damaged in the ground, during an Houthi attack at King Fahd airbase, Taif region, Saudi Arabia.
- 27 September 2026 - A Saudi Arabian Vestel Karayel drone was shot down by Houthi forces over Hajjah province.
- 8 October 2026 - A Saudi Arabian Airbus A320 was destroyed by an Houthi ballistic missile attack on King Khalid International Airport, Riyadh, Saudi Arabia. One civilian pilot was reported killed.
- 14 October 2026 - Damaged - A Saudi Arabian Eurofighter Typhoon was hit and damaged by an Houthi air defence missile over the Saada governorate, Yemen.
- 18 October 2026 - A Saudi Arabian National Guard AH-6i helicopter was lost near the Yemeni border, in the Najran region, Saudi Arabia. The spokesperson of the Saudi-led coalition Major ‌General Turki al-Maliki previously reported that the helicopter was lost due to mechanical issues killing the crew of two. The Houthis later claimed to have shot it down by a missile.
- 4 November 2026 – A Saudi Arabian Wing Loong II drone, was shot down by Houthi forces over Taiz, Yemen. Houthi media recorded the crash site and the wreckage.

== By type ==
Piston and jet aircraft losses
Airframe	Destroyed	Hostile fire
Beechcraft Super King Air	1 (Yemen)	1
Ilyushin Il-76	3 (Yemen)	3
Airbus A320	4 (3 (Yemen) ,1 (Saudi Arabia) )	4
Airbus A330	1 (Yemen)	1
Bombardier CRJ200	1 (Yemen)	1
Bombardier CRJ700	1 (Yemen)	1
CASA CN-235M-300	1 (Yemen)	1
IOMAX AT-802i BPA	1 (United Arab Emirates)	-
Mikoyan MiG-29	2 (Yemen)	2
Sukhoi Su-22	4 (Yemen)	4
Sukhoi Su-24	1 (Sudan)	1
Eurofighter Typhoon	3 (2 (Saudi Arabia) ,1 damaged,1 (Italy) damaged)	2 (damaged)
Boeing F-15SA	3 (Saudi Arabia) (2 damaged)	3 (2 damaged)
General Dynamics F-16 Fighting Falcon	3 (1 (Jordan) ,1 (Bahrain) ,1 (Morocco) )	2 + 1 claim
Boeing F/A-18E/F Super Hornet	3 (United States)	1
Dassault Mirage 2000	1 (United Arab Emirates)	1
Panavia Tornado IDS	3 (Saudi Arabia)	2

Rotary wing and tilt-rotor losses
Airframe	Destroyed	Hostile fire
NSA 407MRH	1 (United Arab Emirates)	-
Boeing AH-6	1 (Saudi Arabia)	1 claimed
Boeing AH-64 Apache	10 (9 (Saudi Arabia) , 1 (United Arab Emirates) )	3 + 2 claimed
Sikorsky UH-60 Black Hawk	3 (1 (Saudi Arabia) , 1 (United Arab Emirates) , 1 (United States) )	-
Bell Boeing V-22 Osprey	1 (United States)	-
Bell 214 Huey	2 (Yemen)	2
Aérospatiale SA 365 Dauphin	1 (Saudi Arabia) (damaged)	1 (damaged)
Mil Mi-24	1	1
Mil Mi-8	1	1
Unknown helicopter type	1 (1)	1 claim

Unmanned aerial vehicles losses
Airframe	Destroyed	Hostile fire
Selex ES Falco	1 (United Arab Emirates)	1
Denel Dynamics Seeker 400	4 (3 (Saudi Arabia) , 1 (United Arab Emirates) )	4
Qasef-1/2	3	1 + 2 claim
CAIG Wing Loong/Wing Loong II	9 (5 (Saudi Arabia) , 4 (United Arab Emirates) )	7
CASC CH-4	16 (Saudi Arabia)	15 + 1 claim
Bayraktar Akinci	1 (Saudi Arabia)	1
General Atomics RQ-1 / MQ-1 Predator	6 (3 (United Arab Emirates) , 3 (United States) )	6
General Atomics MQ-1C Gray Eagle	1 (United States)	1
General Atomics MQ-9 Reaper	27 (United States)	27
Schiebel Camcopter S-100	7 (United Arab Emirates)	7
Vestel Karayel	6 (Saudi Arabia)	6
Samad drones	3	3
AeroVironment RQ-20 Puma	2 (Saudi Arabia)	2
Boeing Insitu RQ-21 Blackjack	1 (United States)	-
EMT Luna X-2000	1 (Saudi Arabia)	1
Boeing Insitu ScanEagle	12 ( (United States) (Saudi Arabia) )	10 + 2 claim
Samad-1	2	2
Unknown/Various drones	5 (3, 2 (Saudi Arabia) )	5 claim

== See also ==
- List of aircraft shootdowns
- List of aviation shootdowns and accidents during the Libyan crisis
- List of aviation shootdowns and accidents during the Syrian civil war
