= List of aviation shootdowns and accidents during the Libyan crisis =

This is a list of aviation shootdowns and accidents during the Libyan crisis. It includes helicopters, fixed-wing aircraft and drones (UAVs), and losses from the First Libyan Civil War (2011), the Factional violence in Libya (2011–2014), the Second Libyan Civil War (2014–2020) and the current post-civil war fighting.

== Factional violence in Libya (2011–2014) ==
- 6 July 2012 – A Libyan police Mil Mi-2 helicopter carrying polling materials was hit by a rocket propelled grenade and crash landed at Budezira near Benghazi. A passenger was killed.
- 12 February 2014 – A Libyan Army Mil Mi-35 either crashed or shot down by a rebel faction at sea near Essider, 7 killed.

== Second Libyan Civil War (2014–2020) ==
=== 2015 ===
- 24 March 2015 – A National Salvation Government fighter jet was shot down at Al-Zintan by LNA fighters near Al-Zintan airport.
- 6 May 2015 – One National Salvation Government MiG-25PU jet fighter operated by Libyan Dawn group was lost over Zintan, the pilot was captured by Libyan National Army forces.
- ("2") 11 June 2015 – Two National Salvation Government L-39 Fighters operated by Libyan Dawn group from Misrata are destroyed by ISIS fighters at an Airbase in Sirte.

=== 2016 ===
- 4 January 2016 – A Libyan National Army (LNA) MiG-23ML serial number "6472" crashed near Benina airbase, the pilot ejected and survived.
- 8 February 2016 – A LNA MiG-23ML serial number "6132" crashed near Derna after attacking Islamic State positions.
- 12 February 2016 – LNA MiG-23UB crashed or was shot down near Qaryounis district. The pilots ejected and survived.
- 18 May 2016 – A Libyan MiG-21 crashed upon landing in Tobruk.
- 2 June 2016 – A Government of National Accord (GNA) Dassault Mirage F1 fighter crashed after takeoff due to a mechanical failure, 30 km from Sirte.
- 5 July 2016 – A LNA MiG-23BN fighter crashed in Benghazi after a technical failure.
- 10 August 2016 – A L-39 is shot down possibly by ISIS militant fire near Sirte.
- 22 December 2016 – A NSG MiG-23UB operated by Libyan Dawn Group from Misrata crashed in unknown circumstances en route to Tarhuna.

=== 2017 ===
- 15 January 2017 – A LNA MiG-23ML is lost over Ganfouda/Bosnib area, near Benghazi during a combat mission.
- 18 March 2017 – A LNA MiG-21 shot down by a heat seeking missile fired by Jihadists near Suq al-Hut.
- 29 March 2017 – A LNA MiG-21 fighter crashed because of a technical failure on a house killing its 3 occupants, the pilot dies as well.
- 29 July 2017 – A LNA MiG-21 was shot down by Islamists during a bombing raid in the town of Derna. The pilots ejected safely but were captured by the Islamists and executed.

=== 2019 ===
- 10 April 2019 – LNA forces claim to have shot down a GNA L-39 that took off from Misrata.
- 14 April 2019 – GNA forces shot down a LNA MiG-21MF in the area of Ain Zara, Tripoli, with a Chinese-made FN-6 MANPADS, its pilot Jamal Ben Amer ejected safely and survived, being retrieved by LNA Mi-35 helicopter.
- 23 April 2019 – A GNA Dassault Mirage F1 is shot down possibly by friendly fire or by GNA forces.
- 7 May 2019 – A GNA Dassault Mirage F1 is shot down by Haftar forces. The pilot was captured by LNA forces.
- 14 May 2019 – A GNA Bayraktar TB2 drone is destroyed by LNA defenses in the Al-Jufra area.
- ("2") 6 June 2019 – Two GNA Bayraktar TB2 drones are destroyed along with an operation room by LNA attacks on Mitiga Airport.
- 13 June 2019 – A GNA L-39 fighter is lost by enemy fire or a technical failure on Al-Dafiniya.
- 13 June 2019 – A GNA Air force helicopter is reported shot down by the LNA near the city of Misrata. GNA acknowledged the loss of the helicopter but ruled out it was shot down and attributed the loss to an accident.
- 30 June 2019 – A GNA Bayraktar TB2 drone is destroyed by LNA defenses.
- 4 July 2019 – A GNA Air Force L-39 is shot down by General Haftar forces near Tarhuna, 80 km southeast of Tripoli. GNA forces acknowledged the loss.
- ("2") 25 July 2019 – Two LNA Ilyushin Il-76TD cargo planes are destroyed in the ground in al-Jufra Air base by an attack made by Bayraktar TB2 drones.
- 25 July 2019 – A GNA Bayraktar TB2 drone is shot down near al-Jufra airbase during the same attack.
- ("2") July 2019 – Two GNA Orbiter-3 scout drones are destroyed by LNA defenses, one in Tripoli and another in Sidra.
- 3 August 2019 – A LNA Wing Loong II combat drone is shot down by GNA defenses over Misrata.
- 6 August 2019 – A GNA Ilyushin Il-76TD cargo plane is destroyed in the ground at Misrata Airport by a LNA Wing Long drone.
- 7 August 2019 – A GNA L-39 fighter was reported destroyed by LNA armed forces when landing in Misrata.
- 18 October 2019 – A LNA Wing Loong II combat drone is shot down in Misrata by a surface-air missile.
- 21 November 2019 – An Italian MQ-9 Reaper UAV is shot down by LNA air defense forces in the Suq al Ahad area, north of Tarhouna. According to LNA Spokesperson Ahmad al-Mesmari, the Italian drone was violating LNA airspace. The drone was believed to be shot down by Pantsir air defenses.
- 21 November 2019 – A US MQ-9 Reaper UAV is shot down over Libya, AFRICOM officials believed the drone was shot down by Russian defense systems.
- 7 December 2019 – A LNA Mig-23ML is shot down by GNA forces in the Yarmouk frontline in southern Tripoli and crashed in Al-Zawiya city. The pilot ejected and was captured by GNA forces.
- 14 December 2019 – A GNA Bayraktar TB2 drone is shot down in Ain Zara, Tripoli.

=== 2020 ===
- 2 January 2020 – A GNA Bayraktar TB2 drone is shot down south of Mitiga Airport, Tripoli.
- 22 January 2020 – A GNA Bayraktar TB2 drone with GNA markings is shot down by LNA forces after taking off from Mitiga Airport.
- 28 January 2020 – A LNA Wing Loong II combat drone is shot down near Misrata.
- 25 February 2020 – The LNA shoot down a GNA Turkish made Bayraktar TB2 drone, providing a video of the wreck.
- 26 February 2020 – The LNA shoot down another GNA Turkish-made Bayraktar TB2 drone, providing video of the wreck.
- ("2") 28 February 2020 – LNA shot down two GNA Bayraktar TB2 drones in Qasr bin Ghashir and Wadi al-Rabie.
- ("2") 31 March 2020 – LNA shot down two GNA Bayraktar TB2 combat drones near Tripoli; one at Misrata Air College, and another at Al-Tawaisha.
- 2 April 2020 – LNA forces air defences shot down a GNA L-39 fighter near Abu Qurayn. Both pilots were killed.
- 5 April 2020 – An Antonov An-26 transport plane was destroyed on an airstrip near Tarhuna, Libya. Forces of the Government of National Accord (GNA) reported they shot an Antonov cargo plane carrying ammunition for Libyan National Army (LNA) militias. LNA confirmed the attack but stated that the aircraft carried medical supplies.
- 6 April 2020 – A GNA IAI Harpy/Harop loitering munition drone is reported destroyed in Libya.
- 11 April 2020 – A GNA Bayraktar TB2 drone is shot down in Tarhuna.
- On 13 April 2020, a GNA TB2, serial number T94 is shot down near Mitiga airport by LNA forces.
- 14 April 2020 – A GNA Dassault Mirage F1 fighter is shot down by LNA forces operating Pantsir-S missile systems.
- 16 April 2020 – A GNA Bayraktar TB2 drone was shot down near Tarhuna.
- ("2") 17 April 2020 – Two GNA Bayraktar TB2 drones are shot down; one with serial number T95 near Bani Walid and another in Misratah.
- 18 April 2020 – A GNA Bayraktar TB2 drone is shot down by LNA forces south of Tripoli.
- 19 April 2020 – A combat drone is shot down in Alwhaska, near Misrata, GNA sources claimed the downed drone was a LNA Wing Loong II. In turn LNA claimed they shot down a TAI Anka combat drone; however, a UN Security Council report asserted the downed drone was a TAI Anka drone operated by GNA.
- 2 May 2020 – A GNA Bayraktar TB2 drone is destroyed at Arada, near Mitiga Airport, downed by LNA forces.
- 9 May 2020 – Mortar fire from LNA forces struck Tripoli's Mitiga International Airport destroying a GNA Airforce Il-78 Military Transport.
- 12 May 2020 – A GNA Bayraktar TB2 drone is shot down near Ash Shwayrif, Tripoli.
- 13 May 2020 – A LNA Wing Loong II combat drone is shot down near al-Watiyah.
- 17 May 2020 – LNA and GNA sources dispute the shot down of an enemy combat drone dear Al-Watiya Airbase.
- 18 May 2020 – A LNA Wing Loong II combat drone is shot down between Zuwara and Aljmail, allegedly by an Italian frigate.
- ("3") 21 May 2020 – Libyan National Army's Pantsir missile system shot down three GNA drones; a TAI Anka drone over Tarhuna city; a Bayraktar TB2 in al-Shuwairif area in southwest Jabal al-Gharbi province, and another Bayraktar TB2 in Qaryat.
- 24 May 2020 – One LNA Wing Loong II combat drone is shot down by friendly fire from LNA Pantsir air defenses over Libya.
- 24 May 2020 – One LNA CAIG Wing Loong was shot down near Sirte by GNA forces.
- ("2") 7 June 2020 – Two GNA TB2 drones were shot down by LNA forces near Sirte.

=== Table ===
Aircraft losses
Airframe	LNA	GNA	Others
MiG-21	5	—	1 NSG
MiG-23	6	—	1 NSG
MiG-25	—	—	1 NSG
Mirage F1	—	4	
L-39 Albatros	—	5	3 NSG
Antonov An-26	1	—	—
Ilyushin Il-76	2	1	1 (Russia)
Unknown fighter	—	—	1 NSG
Unknown helicopter		1	
General Atomics MQ-9 Reaper	—	—	3 (2 (United States) , 1 (Italy) )
Bayraktar TB2	—	22	—
Baykar Bayraktar Akıncı	—	1	—
TAI Anka	—	2	—
CAIG Wing Loong/ II	9	—	—

== Post-civil war fighting (2020–present) ==
- 22 October 2020 – A LNA Wing Loong II was found destroyed in Ash-Shwayrif, actual loss date unknown.
- 3 August 2021 – A LNA Wing Loong II was found destroyed in Bani Walid, actual loss date unknown.
- 22 August 2022 – A US MQ-9 Reaper UAV was shot down over Libya by a Pantsir air defense system.
- 7 December 2023 – A Russian Ilyushin Il-76 transport aircraft was destroyed at Al Jufra Airbase, presumably hit by a drone or missile strike.
- 28 January 2025 – A Bayraktar Akıncı drone operated by the Government of National Unity (GNU) was shot down and crashed near Ajaylat.

== See also ==
- List of aircraft shootdowns
- List of aviation shootdowns and accidents during the Syrian civil war
- List of aviation shootdowns and accidents during the Saudi Arabian–led intervention in Yemen
