= Grumman A-6 Intruder =

1960 attack strike aircraft family by Grumman

A-6 Intruder
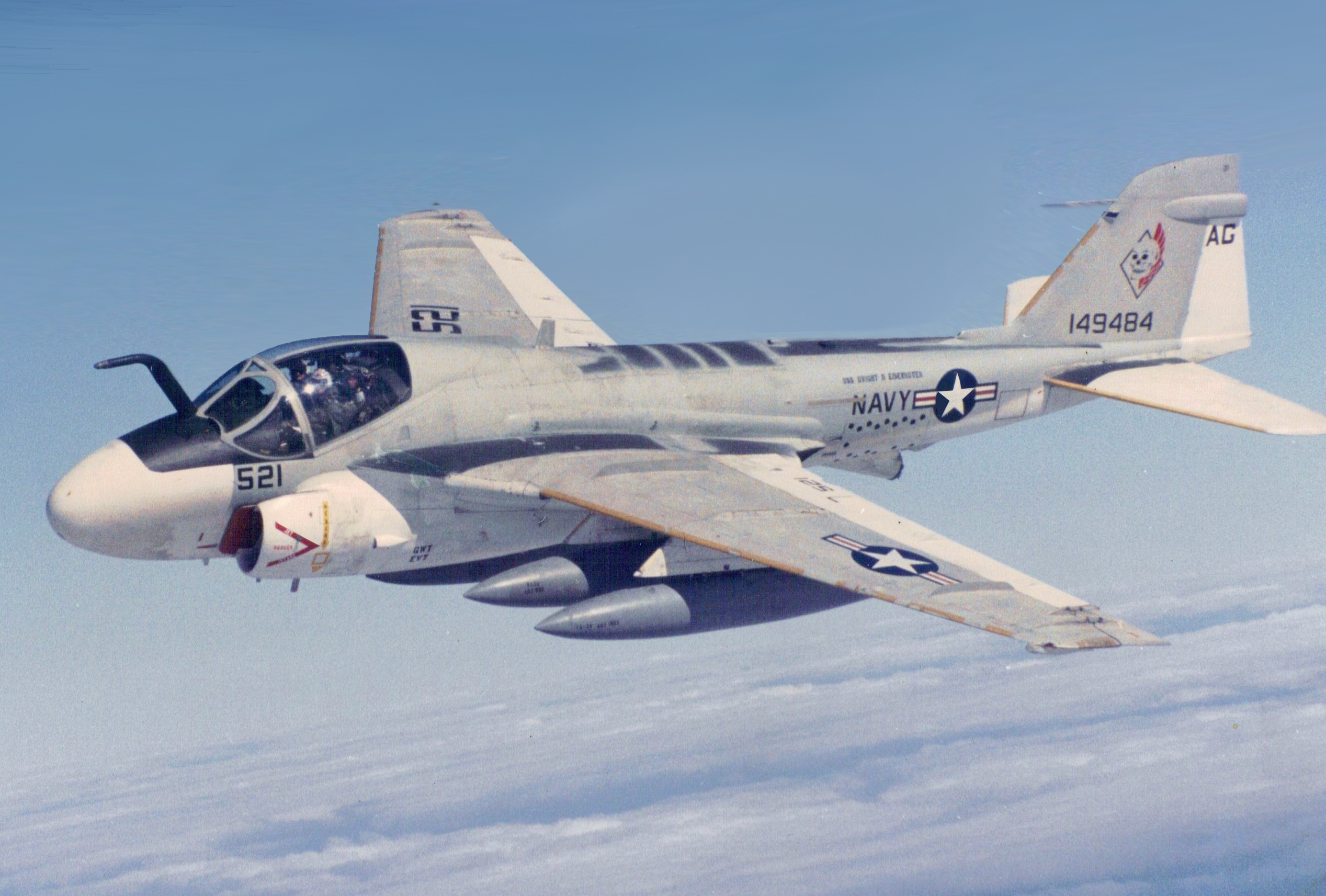
- KA-6D Intruder of Attack Squadron 34 (VA-34 "Blue Blasters")

General information
- Type: Attack aircraft; Aerial tanker (KA-6D variant)
- National origin: United States
- Manufacturer: Grumman
- Status: Retired from military use
- Primary users: United States Navy United States Marine Corps
- Number built: 693

History
- Manufactured: 1962–1992
- Introduction date: 1963
- First flight: 19 April 1960
- Retired: 28 April 1993 (USMC); 28 February 1997 (USN)
- Developed into: Northrop Grumman EA-6B Prowler

The Grumman A-6 Intruder is a twinjet, all-weather subsonic attack aircraft developed and manufactured by American aircraft company Grumman Aerospace. It was formerly operated by the U.S. Navy and U.S. Marine Corps.

The A-6 was designed in response to a 1957 requirement issued by the Bureau of Aeronautics for an all-weather attack aircraft for Navy long-range interdiction missions and with short takeoff and landing (STOL) capability for Marine close air support. It was to replace the piston-engined Douglas A-1 Skyraider. The requirement allowed either single or twin-engined aircraft, as well as either turbojet or turboprop-based engines. The winning proposal from Grumman was powered by a pair of Pratt & Whitney J52 turbojet engines. The A-6 was the first U.S. Navy aircraft to have an integrated airframe and weapons system. Operated by a crew of two in a side-by-side seating configuration, the workload was divided between the pilot and weapons officer (bombardier/navigator or BN). In addition to conventional munitions, it could also carry nuclear weapons, which would be delivered using toss bombing techniques.

On 19 April 1960, the first prototype made its maiden flight; the type was introduced to squadron service during February 1963. The A-6 was operated by both the U.S. Navy and U.S. Marine Corps as their principal all-weather/night attack aircraft between 1963 and 1997, during which time multiple variants were developed and introduced. One derivative of the type was the EA-6B Prowler, a specialized electronic warfare aircraft. Another was the KA-6D, a dedicated aerial refueling tanker. The definitive attack version of the aircraft, which was furnished with vastly upgraded navigation and attack systems, was the A-6E. While the development of further variants, such as the A-6F, were explored, they ultimately did not come to fruition.

The A-6 saw active combat across multiple conflicts. Its combat debut was the Vietnam War, in which the type operated from both carriers and shore facilities. The type proved vulnerable to conventional ground fire and ground-based anti-aircraft measures, which brought down 56 A-6s. In the 1980s, both the Multinational Force in Lebanon and Operation El Dorado Canyon made use of the type. During the Gulf War, a combination of U.S. Navy and U.S. Marine Corps A-6s conducted in excess of 4,700 combat sorties against a variety of Iraqi ground-based targets. During the 1990s, the A-6 was intended to be superseded by the McDonnell Douglas A-12 Avenger II, but this program was ultimately canceled due to cost overruns. Thus, when the A-6E was scheduled for retirement, its precision strike mission was initially taken over by the Grumman F-14 Tomcat equipped with a LANTIRN pod, and later passed on to the Boeing F/A-18E/F Super Hornet.

== Development ==
=== Background ===
As a result of the fair-weather limitation of the propeller-driven A-1 Skyraider in the Korean War and the advent of turbine engines, the United States Navy issued preliminary requirements in 1955 for an all-weather carrier-based attack aircraft. The U.S. Navy published an Operational Requirements Document (ORD) for it in October 1956. It released a Request For Proposals (RFP) in February 1957. The RFP called for a "close air support attack bomber capable of hitting the enemy at any time". The specification was shaped by the service's Korean War experiences, during which air support had been frequently unavailable unless fair weather conditions were present.

In response to the RFP, a total of eleven design proposals were submitted by eight different companies, including Bell, Boeing, Douglas, Grumman, Lockheed, Martin, North American, and Vought. Grumman's submission was internally designated as the Type G-128. Following evaluation of the bids, the U.S. Navy announced the selection of Grumman on 2 January 1958. The company was awarded a contract for the development of their submission, which had been re-designated A2F-1, in February 1958.

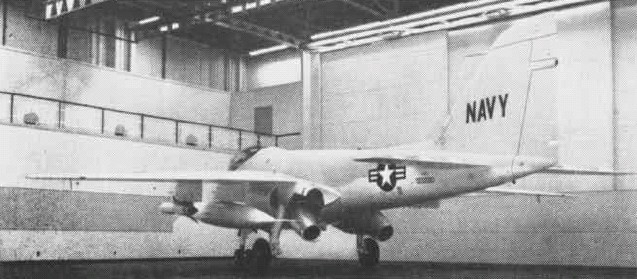
YA2F-1 showing the original tilting tailpipes

Grumman's design team was led by Robert Nafis and Lawrence Mead, Jr. Mead later played a lead role in the design of the Lunar Excursion Module and the Grumman F-14 Tomcat. The team was spread between two sites, the company's manufacturing plant at Bethpage, New York, and the testing facilities at Naval Weapons Industrial Reserve Plant, Calverton in Riverhead, New York. During September 1959, the design was approved by the Mock-Up Review Board.

The A2F-1 design incorporated several cutting-edge features for the era. In the early 1960s, it was novel for a fighter-sized aircraft to have sophisticated avionics that used multiple computers. This design experience was taken into consideration by NASA in their November 1962 decision to choose Grumman over other companies like General Dynamics-Convair (the F-111 had computerized avionics capabilities comparable to the A-6, but did not fly until 1964) to build the Lunar Excursion Module, which was a small-sized spacecraft with two onboard computers.

=== Test program ===
The first prototype YA2F-1, lacking radar and the navigational and attack avionics, made its first flight on 19 April 1960, with the second prototype flying on 28 July 1960.

The test program required to develop the aircraft was prolonged. The very advanced navigation and attack equipment required substantial development, and changes had to be made to correct aerodynamic deficiencies and remove unwanted features. Extending the air brakes, which were mounted on the rear fuselage, changed the downwash at the horizontal tailplane which overloaded its actuator so the tailplane was moved rearwards by 16 inches (41 cm). Later evaluation of the aircraft showed that the airbrakes were not effective enough in controlling the speed of the aircraft and they were moved to the wing-tips. Early production aircraft were fitted with both the fuselage and wingtip air brakes, although the fuselage-mounted ones were soon disabled, and were removed from later aircraft. The trailing edge of each wing-tip split to form a much more effective speed-brake which projected above and below the wing when extended.

The rudder needed a wider chord at its base to give greater exposed area to assist spin recovery.

A major difference between the first six production aircraft and subsequent aircraft were the jet nozzles; the close-air support role sought by the U.S. Marine Corps required STOL performance to operate from forward airstrips. Jet deflection using tilting tailpipes was proposed. The performance benefits from varying the angle were not worthwhile, whether operating from short strips or carriers, thus they were fixed at a seven degree downward angle.

=== Further development ===
During February 1963, the A-6 was introduced to service with the US Navy; at this point, the type was, according to Gunston and Gilchrist, "the first genuinely all-weather attack bomber in history". However, early operating experiences found the aircraft to be imposing very high maintenance demands, particularly in the Asian theatre of operations, and serviceability figures were also low. In response, the Naval Avionics Lab launched a substantial and lengthy program to improve both the reliability and performance of the A-6's avionics suite. The successful performance of the A-6 in operations following these improvements ended proposals to produce follow-on models that featured downgraded avionics.

Various specialized variants of the A-6 were developed, often in response to urgent military requirements raised during the Vietnam War. The A-6C, a dedicated interdictor, was one such model, as was the KA-6D, a buddy store-equipped aerial refueling tanker. Perhaps the most complex variant was the EA-6B Prowler, a specialized electronic warfare derivative. The last variant to be produced was the A-6E, first introduced in 1972; it features extensive avionics improvements, including the new APQ-148 multimode radar, along with minor airframe refinements. The last A-6E was delivered in 1992.

In the early 1980s, the Navy anticipated that an Advanced Carrier-Borne Multirole Fighter (VFMX) would eventually be the long term high-end replacement for both the F-14 and A-6, although this program was short-lived and was succeeded by separate efforts for fleet air defense and deep strike/attack; the latter became the Advanced Tactical Aircraft (ATA) program resulting in the development of the McDonnell Douglas A-12 Avenger II. Meanwhile, a further model, designated A-6F, was being planned. Intended to feature the General Electric F404 turbofan engine, as well as various avionics and airframe improvements, this variant was cancelled under the presumption that the A-12 would be entering production before long. Instead, a life-extension program involving the re-winging of existing A-6E aircraft was undertaken; initially a metal wing had been used before a graphite-epoxy composite wing was developed during the late 1980s. Other improvements were introduced to the fleet around this time, including GPS receivers, new computers and radar sets, more efficient J-52-409 engines, as well as increased compatibility with various additional missiles.

== Design ==
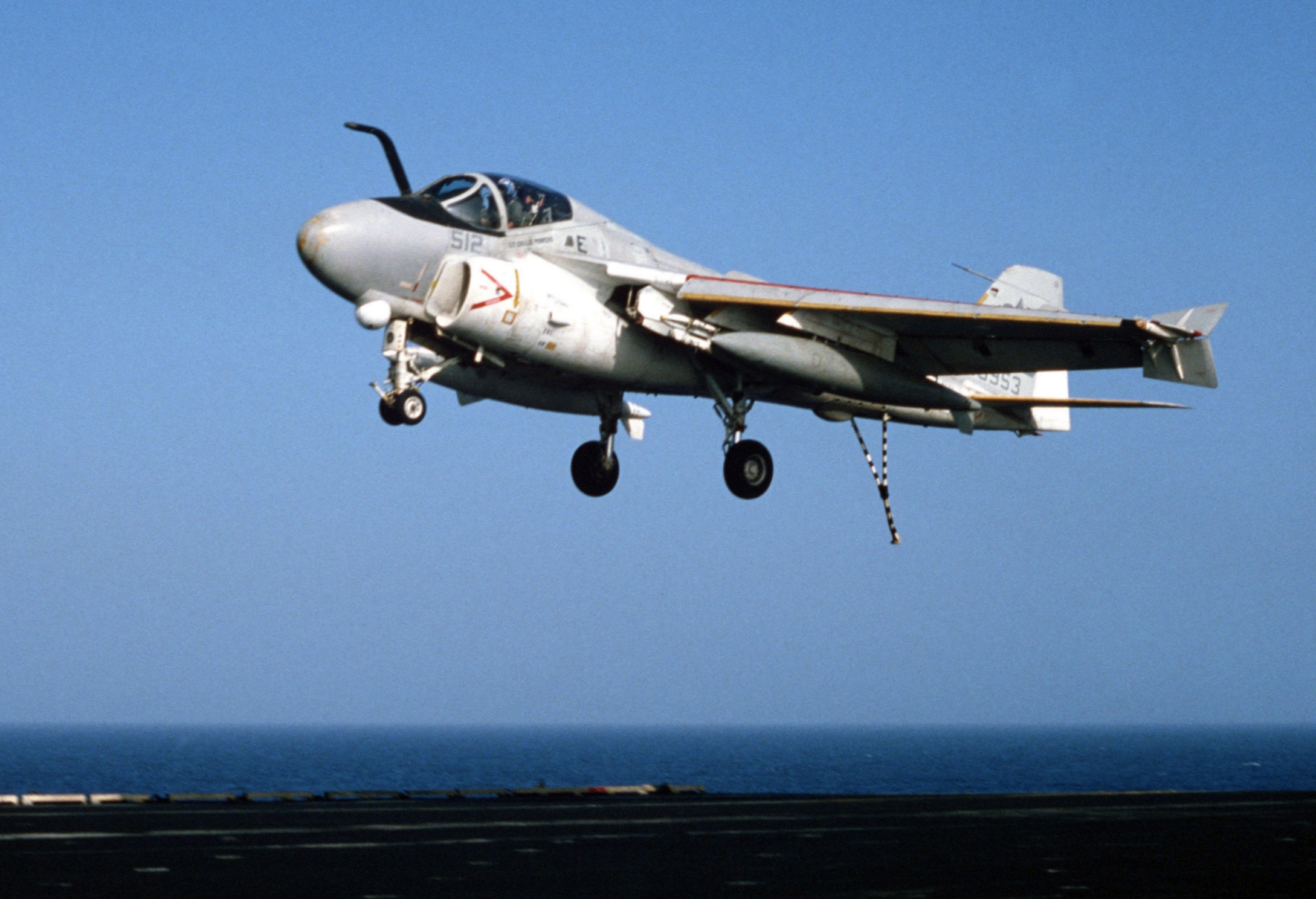
An A-6E landing on the aircraft carrier USS America (CV-66), showing the split airbrakes on the tips of its left wing

The Grumman A-6 Intruder is a two-seat twin-engined monoplane, equipped to perform carrier-based attack missions regardless of prevailing weather or light conditions. The cockpit used an unusual double pane windscreen and side-by-side seating arrangement in which the pilot sat in the left seat, while the bombardier/navigator (BN) sat to the right and slightly below to give the pilot an adequate view on that side. In addition to a radar display for the BN, a unique instrumentation feature for the pilot was a cathode ray tube screen that was known as the Vertical Display Indicator (VDI). This display provided a synthetic representation of the world in front of the aircraft, along with steering cues provided by the BN, enabling head-down navigation and attack at night and in all weather conditions.

The A-6's wing was relatively efficient at subsonic speeds, particularly when compared to supersonic fighters such as the McDonnell Douglas F-4 Phantom II, which are also limited to subsonic speeds when carrying a payload of bombs. The wing was also designed to provide a favorable level of maneuverability even while carrying a sizable bomb load. A very similar wing would be put on pivots on Grumman's later supersonic swing-wing Grumman F-14 Tomcat, as well as similar landing gear.

For its day, the Intruder had sophisticated avionics, with a high degree of integration. To aid in identifying and isolating equipment malfunctions, the aircraft was provided with automatic diagnostic systems, some of the earliest computer-based analytic equipment developed for aircraft. These were known as Basic Automated Checkout Equipment, or BACE (pronounced "base"). There were two levels, known as "Line BACE" to identify specific malfunctioning systems in the aircraft, while in the hangar or on the flight line; and "Shop BACE", to exercise and analyze individual malfunctioning systems in the maintenance shop. This equipment was manufactured by Litton Industries. Together, the BACE systems greatly reduced the Maintenance Man-Hours per Flight Hour, a key index of the cost and effort needed to keep military aircraft operating.

The Intruder was equipped to carry nuclear weapons (B43, B57, B61) which would have been delivered using semi-automated toss bombing.

== Operational history ==
=== Entering service and Vietnam War ===
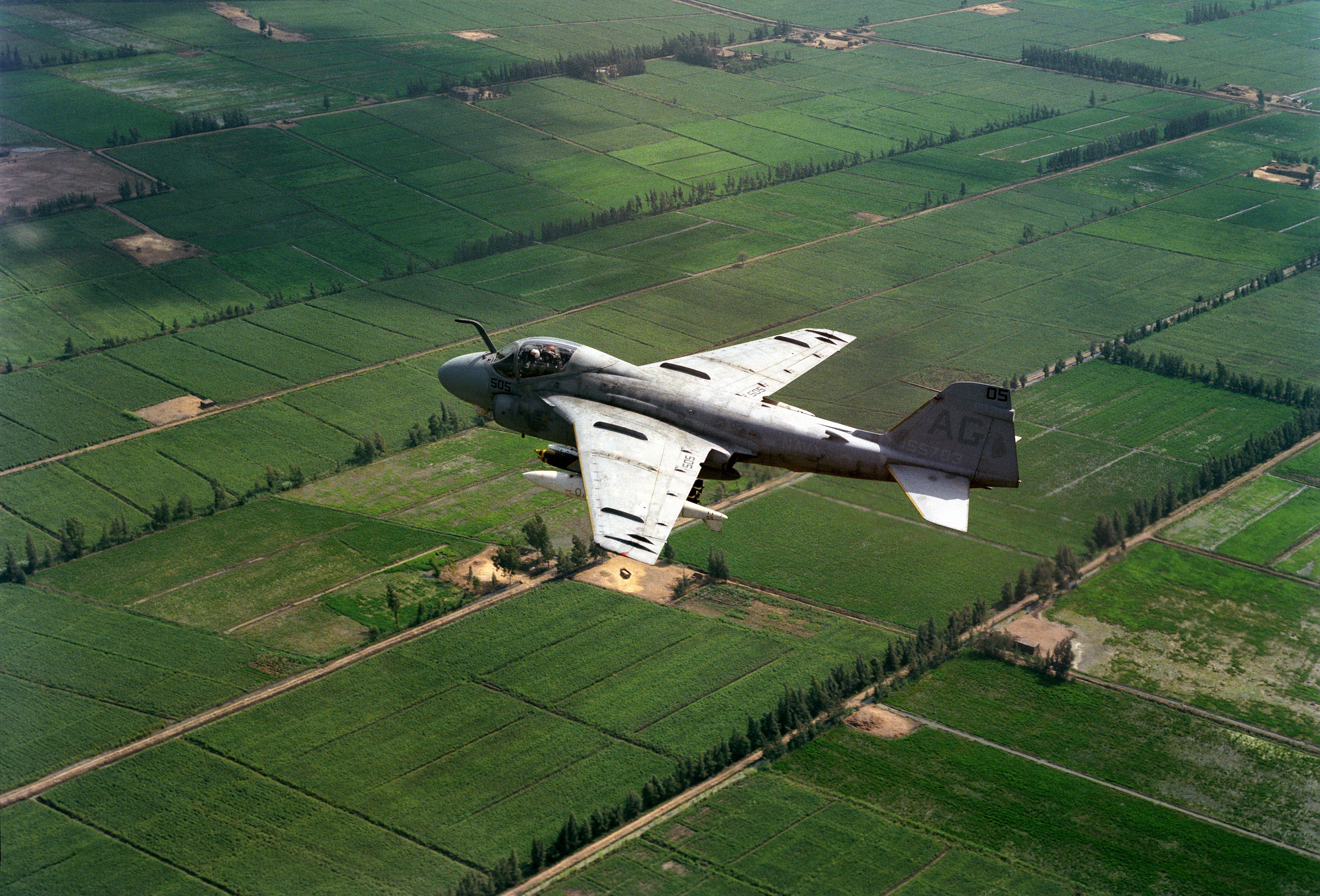
An A-6E Intruder aircraft assigned to USS Dwight D. Eisenhower.

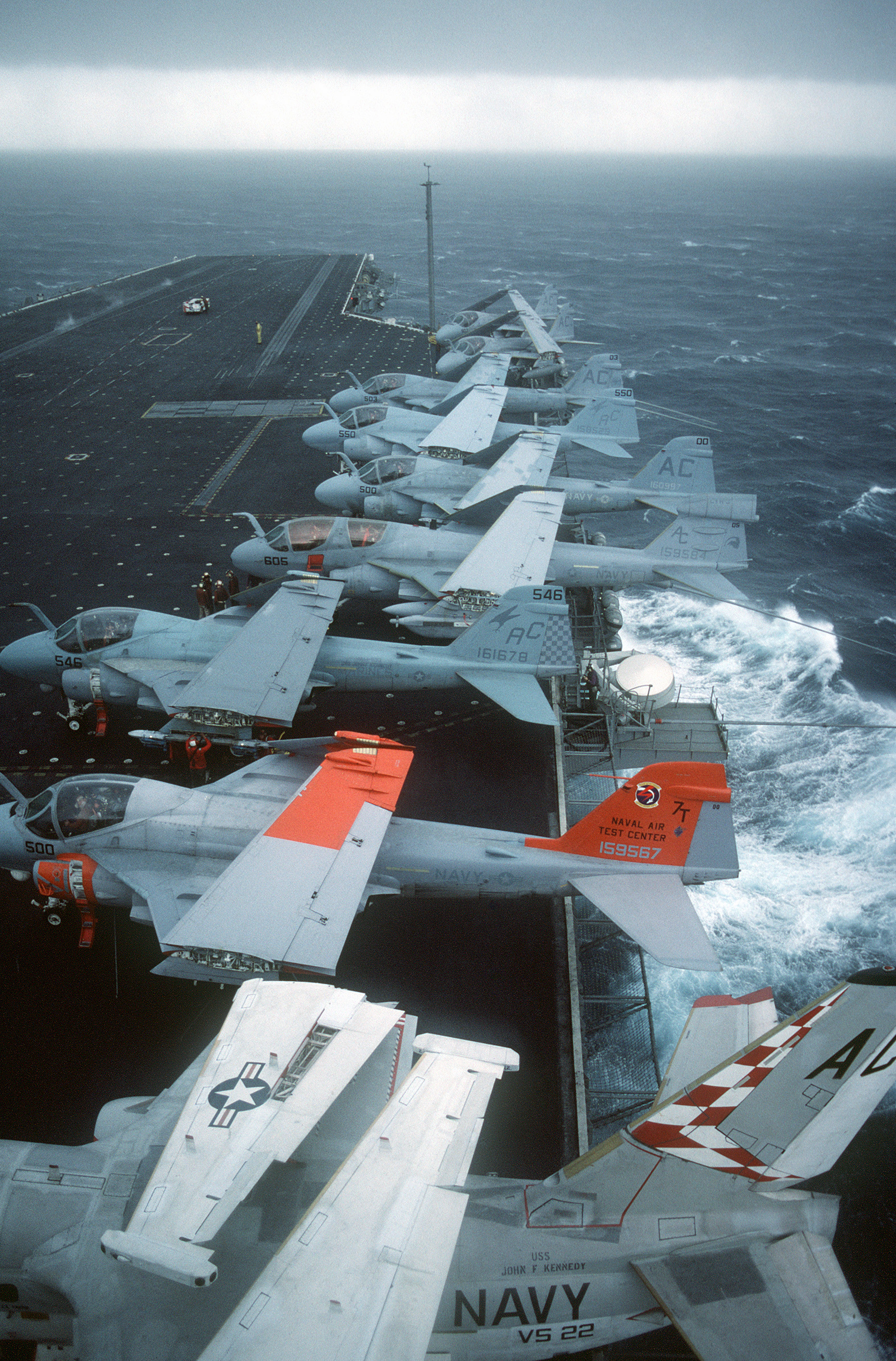
S-3A Viking, A-6E Intruder, and an EA-6B Prowler aircraft are parked on the flight deck of aircraft carrier USS John F. Kennedy during a storm.

The Intruder received a new standardized US DoD designation of A-6A on 18 September 1962, with deliveries to VA-42, the medium attack training squadron, in February 1963. The first operational fleet squadron, VA-75 re-equipped with A-6s from October 1963. The A-6 became both the U.S. Navy's and U.S. Marine Corps's principal medium and all-weather/night attack aircraft from the mid-1960s through the 1990s and as an aerial tanker either in the dedicated KA-6D version or by use of a buddy store (D-704). Whereas the A-6 fulfilled the USN and USMC all-weather ground-attack/strike mission role, this mission in the USAF was served by the Republic F-105 Thunderchief and later the F-111, the latter which also saw its earlier F-111A variants converted to a radar jammer as the EF-111 Raven, analogous to the USN and USMC EA-6B Prowler.

A-6 Intruders first saw action during the Vietnam War, where the craft were used extensively against targets in Vietnam. The aircraft's long range and heavy payload (18,000 pounds or 8,200 kilograms) coupled with its ability to fly in all weather made it invaluable during the war. However, its typical mission profile of flying low to deliver its payload made it especially vulnerable to anti-aircraft fire, and in the eight years the Intruder was used during the Vietnam War, the U.S. Navy and U.S. Marine Corps lost a total of 84 A-6 aircraft of various series. The first loss occurred on 14 July 1965 when an Intruder from VA-75 operating from USS Independence, flown by LT Donald Boecker and LT Donald Eaton, commenced a dive on a target near Laos. An explosion under the starboard wing damaged the starboard engine, causing the aircraft to catch fire and the hydraulics to fail. Seconds later the port engine failed, the controls froze, and the two crewmen ejected. Both crewmen survived.

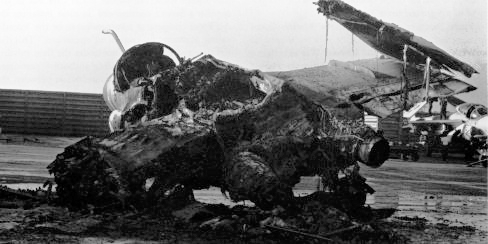
A U.S. Marine Corps A-6 Intruder destroyed by a rocket and mortar bombardment on Da Nang Air Base in 1968 during the Vietnam War

Of the 84 Intruders lost to all causes during the war, 10 were shot down by surface-to-air missiles (SAMs), 2 were shot down by MiGs, 16 were lost to operational causes, and 56 were lost to conventional ground fire and AAA. The last Intruder to be lost during the war was from VA-35, flown by LT C. M. Graf and LT S. H. Hatfield, operating from USS America; they were shot down by ground fire on 24 January 1973 while providing close air support. The airmen ejected and were rescued by a Navy helicopter. Twenty U.S. Navy aircraft carriers rotated through the waters of Southeast Asia, providing air strikes, from the early 1960s through the early 1970s. Nine of those carriers lost A-6 Intruders: USS Constellation lost 11, USS Ranger lost 8, USS Coral Sea lost 6, USS Midway lost 2, USS Independence lost 4, USS Kitty Hawk lost 14, USS Saratoga lost 3, USS Enterprise lost 8, and USS America lost 2. Although capable of embarking aboard aircraft carriers, most U.S. Marine Corps A-6 Intruders were shore based in South Vietnam at Chu Lai and Da Nang and in Nam Phong, Thailand.

=== Lebanon, Libya and Persian Gulf ===
A-6 Intruders were later used in support of other operations, such as the Multinational Force in Lebanon in 1983. On 4 December, one LTV A-7 Corsair II and one Intruder were downed by Syrian missiles. The Intruder's pilot, Lieutenant Mark Lange, and bombardier/navigator Lieutenant Robert "Bobby" Goodman ejected immediately before the crash; Lange died of his injuries while Goodman was captured and taken by the Syrians to Damascus where he was released on 3 January 1984. Later in the 1980s, two Naval Reserve A-7 Corsair II light attack squadrons, VA-205 and VA-304, were reconstituted as medium attack squadrons with the A-6E at NAS Atlanta, Georgia and NAS Alameda, California, respectively.

Intruders also saw action in April 1986 operating from the aircraft carriers USS America and Coral Sea during the bombing of Libya (Operation El Dorado Canyon). The squadrons involved were VA-34 "Blue Blasters" (from USS America) and VA-55 "Warhorses" (from USS Coral Sea).

On 19 October 1987, Intruders of VA-145 operating from USS Ranger attacked Iranian oil platforms during Operation Nimble Archer. On 19 April 1988, VA-95 Intruders operating from USS Enterprise sank the Iranian frigate, Sahand and severely damaged the Iranian frigate, Sabalan during Operation Praying Mantis.

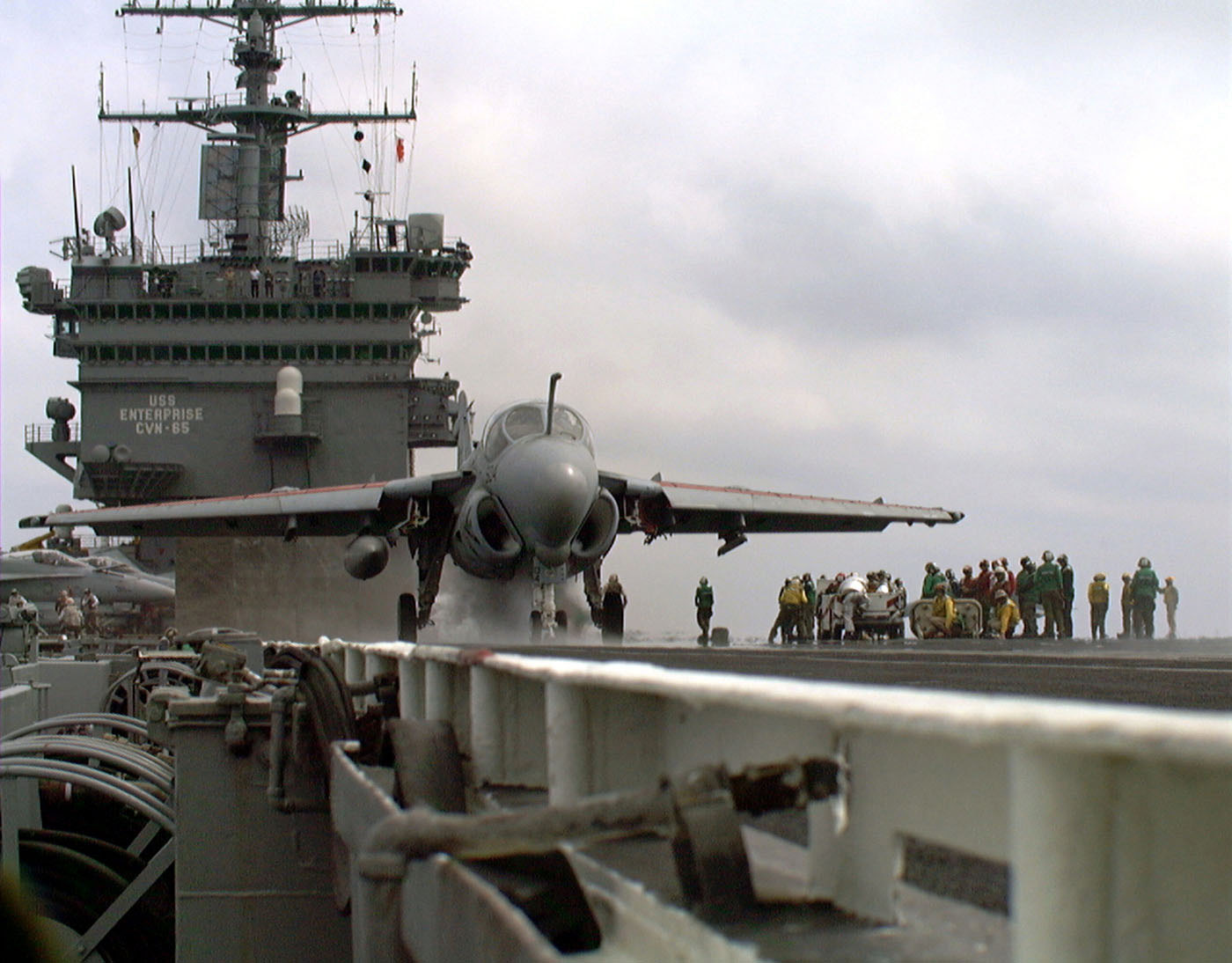
An A-6E Intruder prepares for launch aboard USS Enterprise

=== Gulf War and later action ===
During the Gulf War in 1991, U.S. Navy and U.S. Marine Corps A-6s flew more than 4,700 combat sorties, providing close air support, destroying enemy air defenses, attacking Iraqi naval units, and hitting strategic targets. They were also the U.S. Navy's primary strike platform for delivering laser-guided bombs. The U.S. Navy operated them from the aircraft carriers USS Saratoga, USS John F. Kennedy, USS Midway, USS Ranger, USS America and USS Theodore Roosevelt, while U.S. Marine Corps A-6s operated ashore, primarily from Shaikh Isa Air Base in Bahrain. Three A-6s were shot down in combat by SAMs and AAA.

The Intruder's large blunt nose and slender tail inspired a number of nicknames, including "Double Ugly", "The Mighty Alpha Six", "Iron Tadpole" and also "Drumstick".

Following the Gulf War, Intruders were used to patrol the no-fly zone in Iraq and provided air support for U.S. Marines during Operation Restore Hope in Somalia. The last A-6E Intruder left U.S. Marine Corps service on 28 April 1993. Navy A-6s saw further duty over Bosnia in 1994.

On 4 June 1996, during RIMPAC a US Navy A-6E performing the unusual target towing task to train Japanese Navy air defense crews was mistakenly engaged and shot down by the Japanese destroyer JS Yūgiri with its Phalanx CIWS gun. Both the pilot and BN ejected and were recovered by a motor launch from the destroyer.

=== Retirement ===
Despite the production of new airframes in the 164XXX Bureau Number (BuNo) series just before and after the Gulf War, augmented by a rewinging program of older airframes, the A-6E and KA-6D were quickly phased out of service in the mid-1990s in a U.S. Navy cost-cutting move driven by the Office of the Secretary of Defense to reduce the number of different type/model/series (T/M/S) of aircraft in carrier air wings and U.S. Marine aircraft groups.

The A-6 was intended to be replaced by the McDonnell Douglas A-12 Avenger II, but that program was canceled due to cost overruns. After the A-12's cancellation, the Navy initiated a new attack aircraft program, the Advanced Attack (A-X), to replace the Intruder; A-X would shortly become the Advanced Attack/Fighter (A/F-X) due to added fighter capabilities to eventually replace the F-14 Tomcat as well, but the program would be canceled in the 1993 Bottom Up Review due to post-Cold War budget pressures. The Intruder remained in service for a few more years before being retired in favor of the LANTIRN-equipped F-14D Tomcat, which was in turn replaced by the F/A-18E/F Super Hornet in the U.S. Navy and the twin-seat F/A-18D Hornet in the U.S. Marine Corps. During the 2010s, the Unmanned Carrier-Launched Airborne Surveillance and Strike program was at one point intended to produce an unmanned aerial vehicle (UAV) successor to the Intruder's long-distance strike role, but the initiative has since changed priorities towards the tanker mission instead. The last Intruders were retired on 28 February 1997.

Many in the US defense establishment in general, and Naval Aviation in particular, questioned the wisdom of a shift to a shorter range carrier-based strike force, as represented by the Hornet and Super Hornet, compared to the older generation aircraft such as the Intruder and Tomcat. However, the availability of USAF Boeing KC-135 Stratotanker and McDonnell Douglas KC-10 Extender tankers modified to accommodate USN, USMC and NATO tactical aircraft in all recent conflicts was considered by certain senior decision makers in the Department of Defense to put a lesser premium on organic aerial refueling capability in the U.S. Navy's carrier air wings and self-contained range among carrier-based strike aircraft. Although the Intruder could not match the F-14's or the F/A-18's speed or air-combat capability, the A-6's range and load-carrying ability are still unmatched by newer aircraft in the fleet.

At the time of retirement, several retired A-6 airframes were awaiting rewinging at the Northrop Grumman facility at St. Augustine Airport, Florida; these were later sunk off the coast of St. Johns County, Florida to form a fish haven named "Intruder Reef". Surviving aircraft fitted with the new wings, and later production aircraft (i.e., BuNo 164XXX series) not earmarked for museum or non-flying static display were stored at the AMARG storage center at Davis-Monthan Air Force Base, Arizona.

=== Potential operators ===
In 1966, Israel made a request to purchase A-6 Intruders as part of an effort to modernize its combat aircraft fleet. A recommendation to provide the Israelis up to 24 stripped-down versions of the Intruder, at a total cost of US$62 million, with the option to purchase 24 more aircraft the year after, was then drawn up by the Deputy Special Assistant for National Security Affairs, Robert Komer, to President Lyndon Johnson. The conditions of the purchase were that the Israelis were to continue using Europe as the primary source of their weaponry, quietly support US arms sales to Jordan, allow the United States to announce the deal when convenient to them, and not use the A-6 Intruder as a delivery platform for Israel's suspected stockpile of nuclear weapons.

== Variants ==
=== YA-6A and A-6A ===
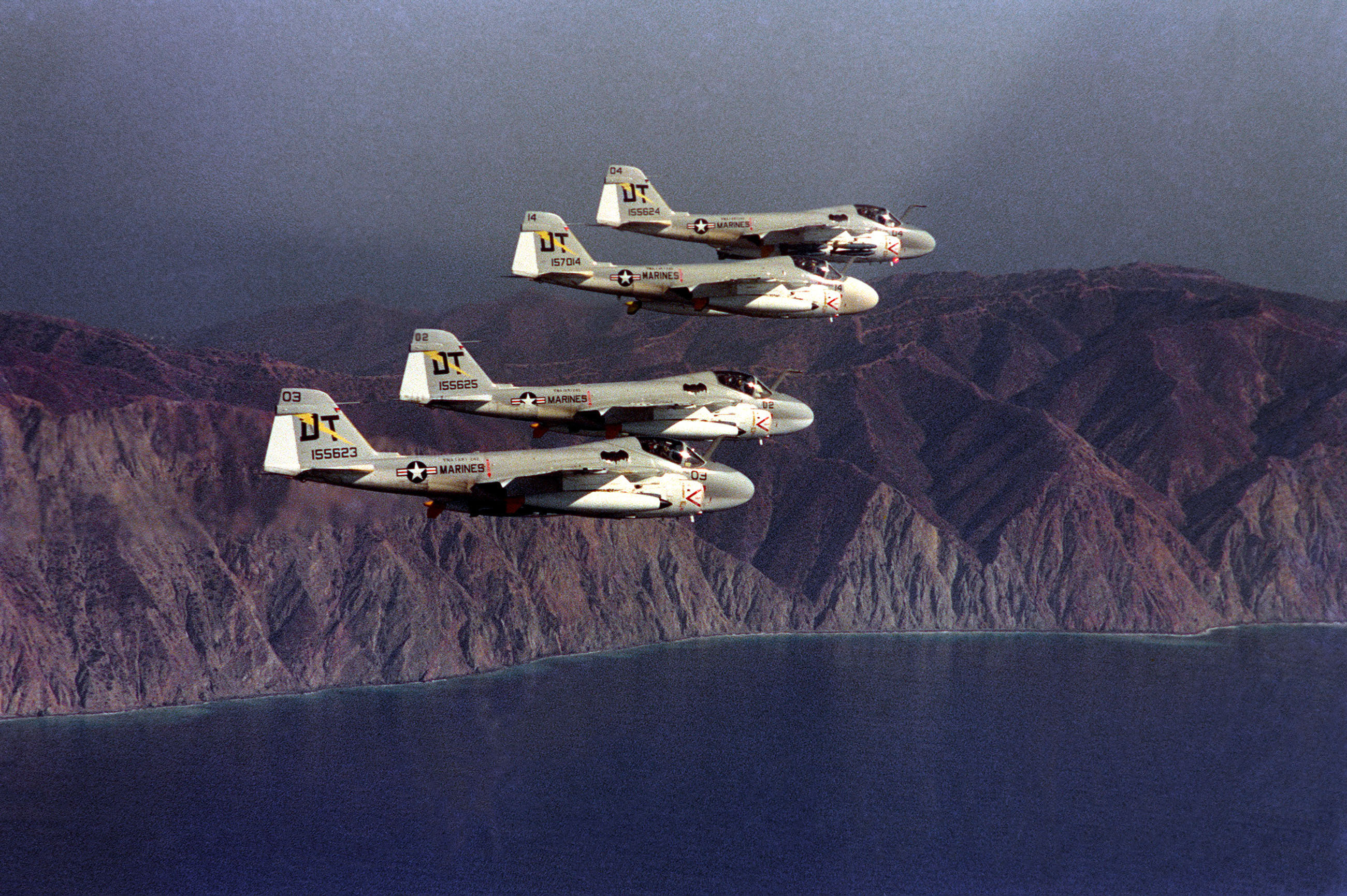
A-6A of VMA (AW)-242 in 1975

The eight prototypes and pre-production Intruder aircraft were sometimes referred to with the YA-6A designation. These were used in the development and testing of the A-6A Intruder.

The initial version of the Intruder was built around the complex and advanced DIANE (Digital Integrated Attack/Navigation Equipment) suite, intended to provide a high degree of bombing accuracy even at night and in poor weather. DIANE consisted of multiple radar systems: the Norden Systems AN/APQ-92 search radar replacing the YA-6A's AN/APQ-88, and a separate AN/APG-46 for tracking, the AN/APN-141 radar altimeter, and an AN/APN-122 Doppler navigational radar to provide position updates to the Litton AN/ASN-31 inertial navigation system. An air-data computer and the AN/ASQ-61 ballistics computer integrated the radar information for the bombardier/navigator in the right-hand seat. TACAN and ADF systems were also provided for navigation. When it worked, DIANE was perhaps the most capable navigation/attack system of its era, giving the Intruder the ability to fly and fight in even very poor conditions (particularly important over Vietnam and Thailand during the Vietnam War). It suffered numerous teething problems, and it was several years before its reliability was established.

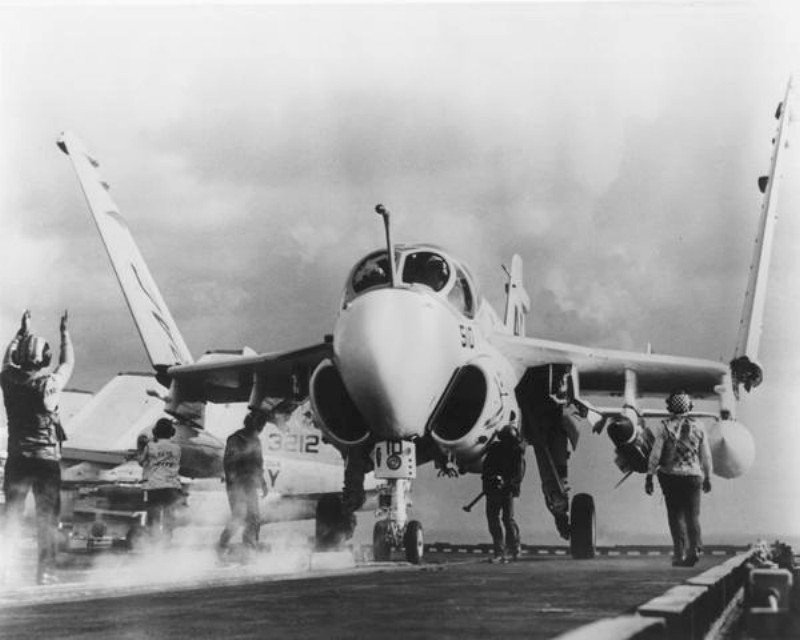
A-6B on the USS Saratoga in 1971

Total A-6A production was 480, excluding the prototype and pre-production aircraft. A total of 47 A-6As were converted to other variants.

=== A-6B ===
To provide U.S. Navy squadrons with a defense suppression aircraft to attack enemy anti-aircraft defense and SAM systems, a mission dubbed "Iron Hand" by the U.S. Navy, 19 A-6As were converted to A-6B version during 1967 to 1970. The A-6B had many of its standard attack systems removed in favor of specialized equipment to detect and track enemy radar sites and to guide AGM-45 Shrike and AGM-78 Standard anti-radiation missiles, with AN/APQ-103 radar replacing earlier AN/APQ-92 used in the A-6A, plus AN/APN-153 navigational radar replacing earlier AN/APN-122, again used in the A-6A.

Between 1968 and 1977, several Intruder squadrons operated A-6Bs alongside their regular A-6As. Five were lost to all causes, and the surviving aircraft were later converted to A-6E standard in the late 1970s.

=== A-6C ===
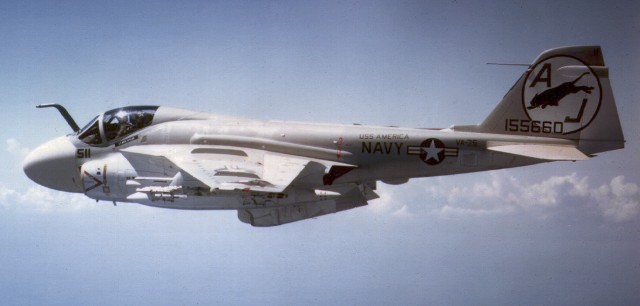
A-6C of VA-35 Black Panthers

12 A-6As were converted in 1970 to A-6C standard for night attack missions against the Ho Chi Minh trail in Vietnam. They were fitted with a "Trails/Roads Interdiction Multi-sensor" (TRIM) pod in the fuselage for FLIR and low-light TV cameras, as well as a "Black Crow" engine ignition detection system. Radars were also upgraded, with the AN/APQ-112 replacing the earlier AN/APQ-103, and an AN/APN-186 navigational radar replacing the earlier AN/APN-153. A vastly improved Sperry Corporation AN/APQ-127 radar replaced the AN/APG-46 fire control radar. One of these aircraft was lost in an accident; the others were later refitted to A-6E standard after the war.

=== KA-6D ===
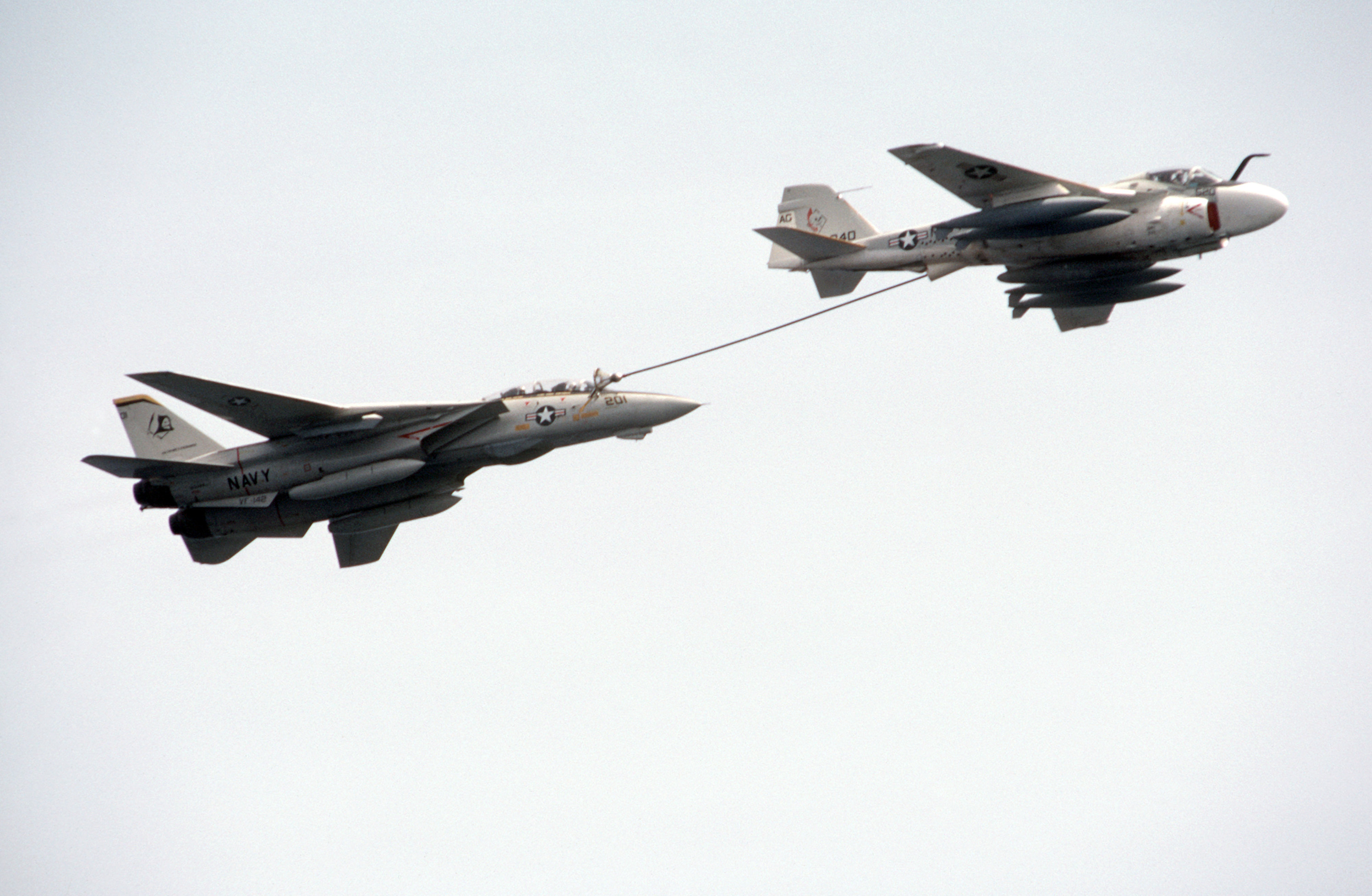
A KA-6D refueling an F-14A in 1987

To replace both the KA-3B and EA-3B Skywarrior during the early 1970s, 78 A-6As and 12 A-6Es were converted for use as tanker aircraft, providing aerial refueling support to other strike aircraft. The DIANE system was removed and an internal refueling system was added, sometimes supplemented by a D-704 refueling pod on the centerline pylon. The KA-6D theoretically could be used in the day/visual bombing role, but it apparently never was, with the standard load-out being four fuel tanks. Because it was based on a tactical aircraft platform, the KA-6D provided a capability for mission tanking, the ability to keep up with strike aircraft and refuel them in the course of a mission. A few KA-6Ds went to sea with each Intruder squadron. Their operation was integrated into the Intruder squadrons, as A-6 crew were trained to operate both aircraft and the NATOPS covered both the A6 and KA-6D. These aircraft were always in short supply, and frequently were "cross decked" from a returning carrier to an outgoing one. Many KA-6 airframes had severe G restrictions, as well as fuselage stretching due to almost continual use and high number of catapults and traps. The retirement of the aircraft left a gap in US Navy and Marine Corps refueling tanker capability. At least 16 KA-6Ds served in the Gulf War. The Navy Lockheed S-3 Viking filled that gap until the new F/A-18E/F Super Hornet became operational.

=== A-6E ===
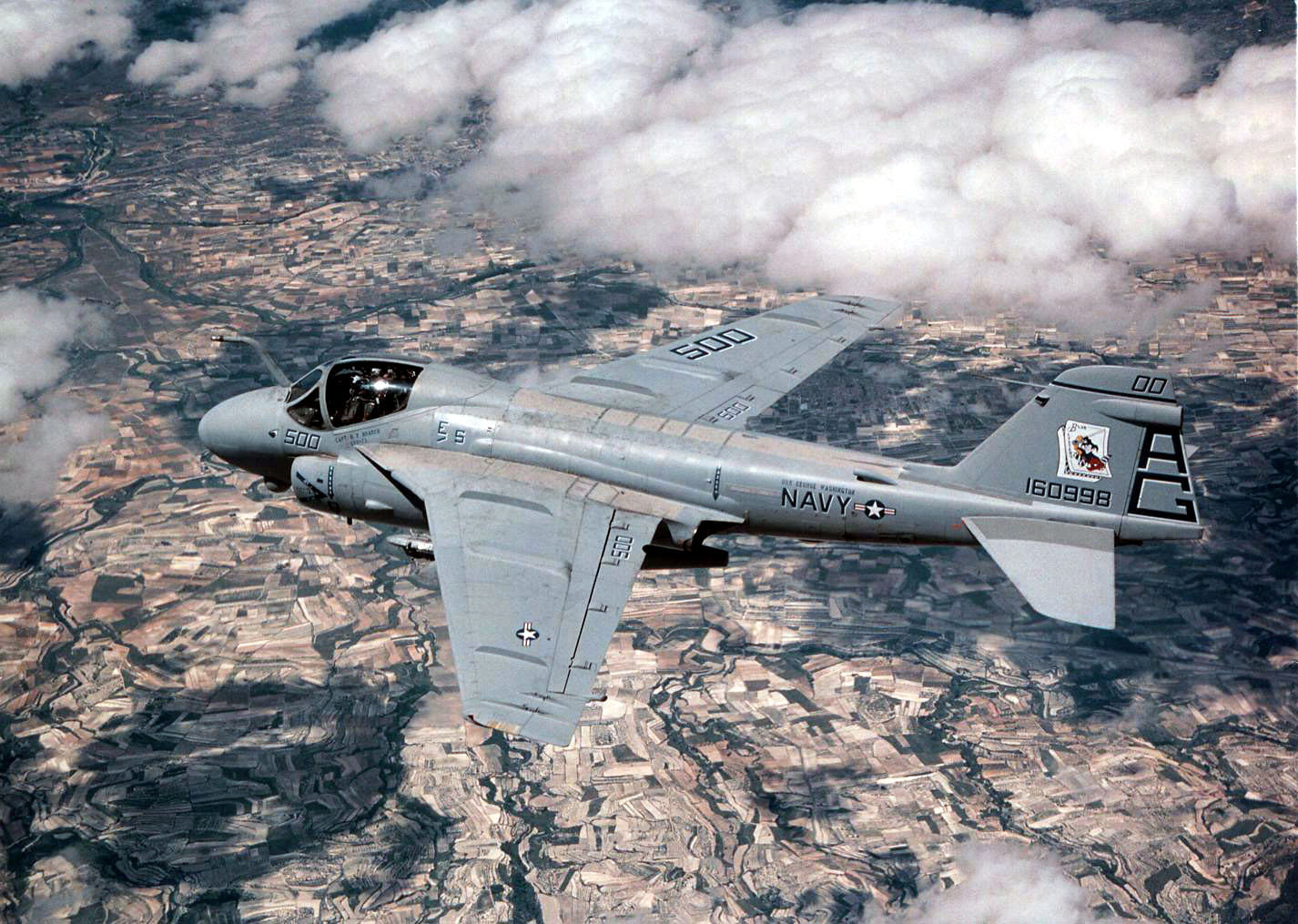
An A-6E 'SWIP' Intruder of VA-34 flying over Spain during Exercise Matador.

The definitive attack version of the Intruder with vastly upgraded navigation and attack systems, introduced in 1970 and first deployed on 9 December 1971. The earlier separate search and track (fire control) radars of the A-6A/B/C were replaced by a single Norden AN/APQ-148 multi-mode radar, and onboard computers with a more sophisticated (and generally more reliable) IC based system, as opposed to the A-6A's DIANE discrete transistor-based technology. A new AN/ASN-92 inertial navigation system was added, along with the CAINS (Carrier Aircraft Inertial Navigation System), for greater navigation accuracy.

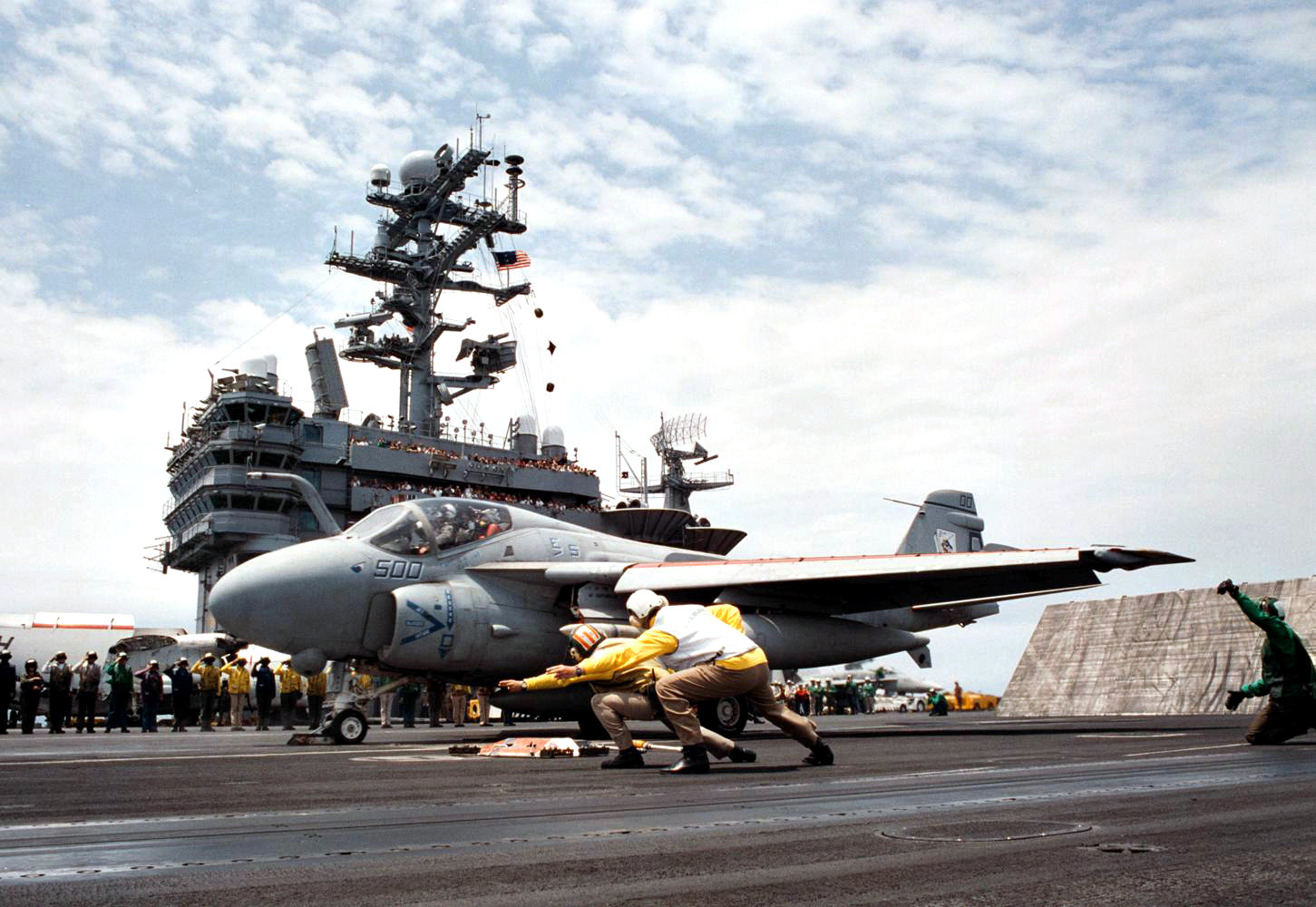
Final VA-34 A-6E SWIP Intruder launch from the flight deck of USS George Washington, 1996.

Beginning in 1979, all A-6Es were fitted with the AN/AAS-33 DRS (Detecting and Ranging Set), part of the 'Target Recognition and Attack Multi-Sensor' (TRAM) system, a small, gyroscopically stabilized turret, mounted under the nose of the aircraft, containing a forward-looking infra-red (FLIR) boresighted with a laser spot-tracker/designator and IBM AN/ASQ-155 computer. TRAM was matched with a new Norden AN/APQ-156 radar. The BN could use both TRAM imagery and radar data for extremely accurate attacks, or use the TRAM sensors alone to attack without using the Intruder's radar (which might warn the target). TRAM also allowed the Intruder to autonomously designate and drop laser-guided bombs. In addition, the Intruder used an Airborne Moving Target Indicator (AMTI), which allowed the aircraft to track a moving target (such as a tank or truck) and drop ordnance on it even though the target was moving. Also, the computer system allowed the use of Offset Aim Point (OAP), giving the crew the ability to drop on a target unseen on radar by noting coordinates of a known target nearby and entering the offset range and bearing to the unseen target.

In the 1980s, the A-6E TRAM aircraft were converted to the A-6E 'Weapons Control System Improvement' (WCSI) version to extend weapons capability. This added the ability to carry and target some of the first generation precision guided weapons, like the AGM-84 Harpoon missile, and AGM-123 Skipper. WCSI equipped aircraft were eventually modified to have a limited capability to use the AGM-84E SLAM standoff land attack missile. Since the Harpoon and SLAM missiles had common communication interfaces, WCSI aircraft could carry and fire SLAM missiles, but needed a nearby A-6E SWIP to guide them to target.

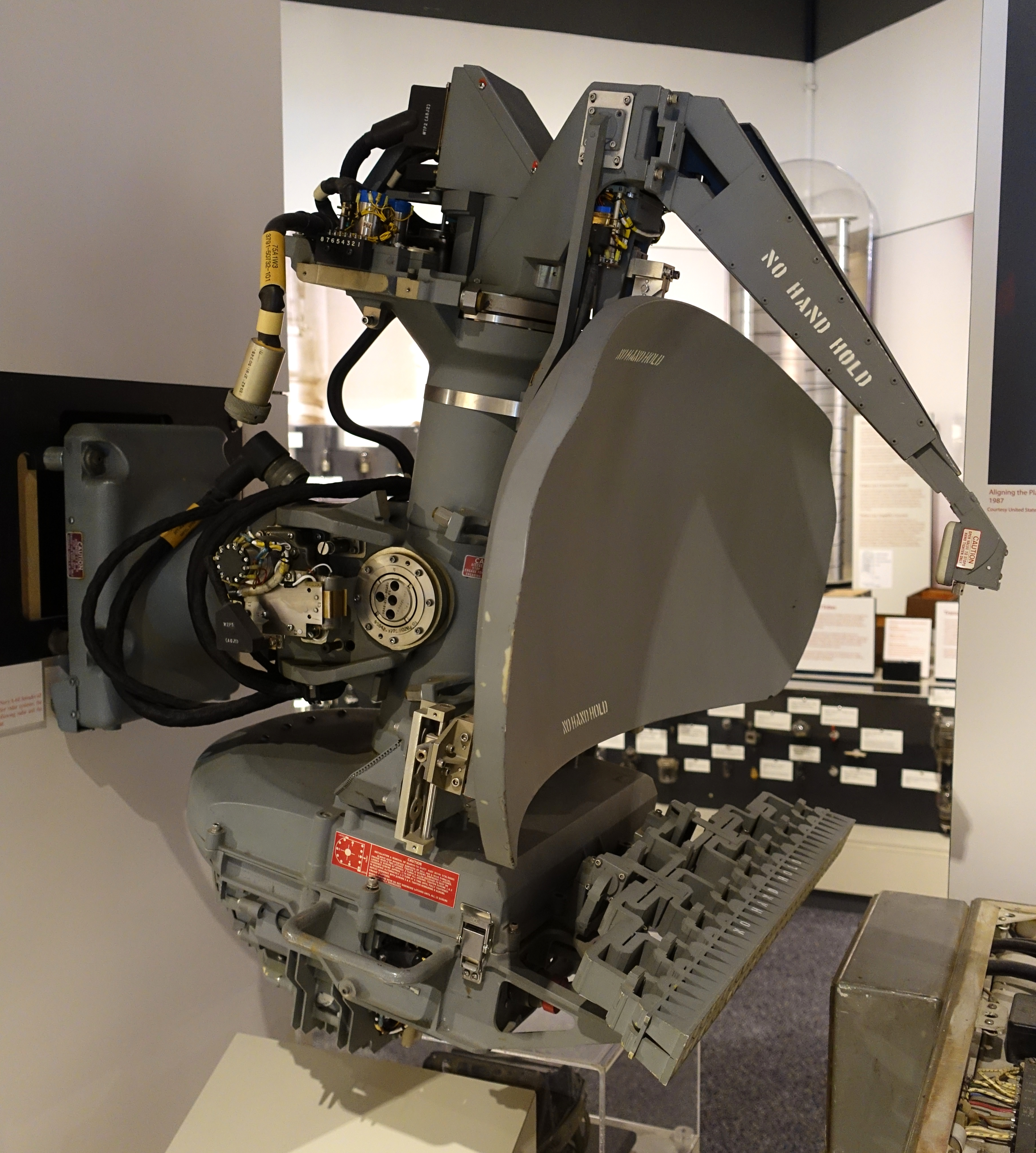
Norden AN/APQ-148 Radar

In the early 1990s, some surviving A-6Es were upgraded under SWIP (Systems/Weapons Improvement Program) to enable them to use the latest precision-guided munitions, including AGM-65 Mavericks, AGM-84E SLAMs, AGM-62 Walleyes and the AGM-88 HARM anti-radiation missile as well as additional capability with the AGM-84 Harpoon. A co-processor was added to the AN/ASQ-155 computer system to implement the needed MIL-STD-1553 digital interfaces to the pylons, as well as an additional control panel. After a series of wing-fatigue problems, about 85% of the fleet was fitted with new graphite/epoxy/titanium/aluminum composite wings. The new wings proved to be a mixed blessing, as a composite wing is stiffer and transmits more force to the fuselage, accelerating fatigue in the fuselage. In 1990, the decision was made to terminate production of the A-6. Through the 1970s and 1980s, the A-6 had been in low-rate production of four or five new aircraft a year, enough to replace mostly accidental losses. The final production order was for 20 aircraft of the SWIP configuration with composite wings, delivered in 1993.

A-6E models totaled 445 aircraft, about 240 of which were converted from earlier A-6A/B/C models.

=== A-6F and A-6G ===
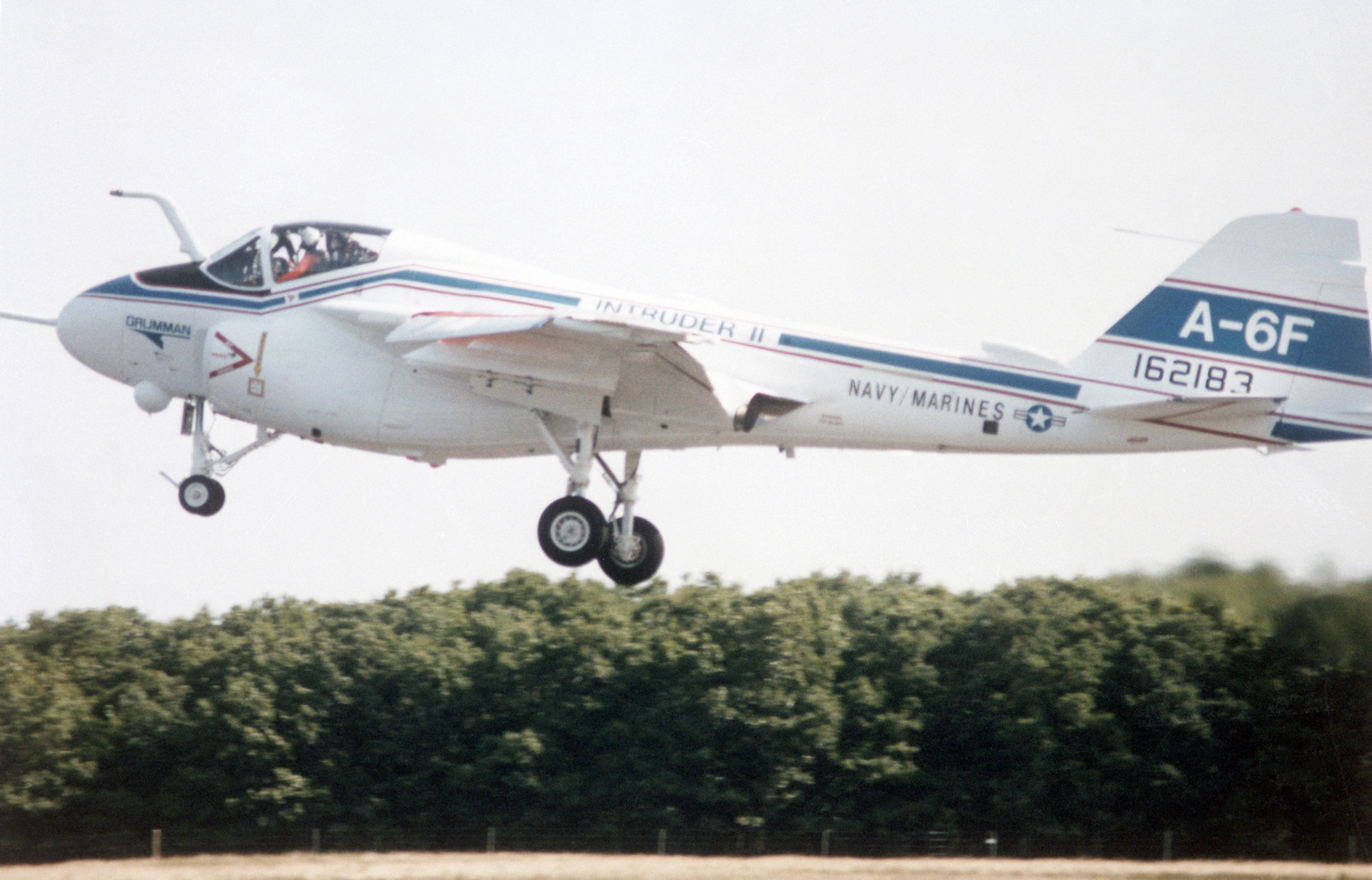
A-6F prototype in 1987

An advanced A-6F Intruder II was proposed in the mid-1980s that would have replaced the Intruder's elderly Pratt & Whitney J52 turbojets with non-afterburning versions of the General Electric F404 turbofan used in the F/A-18 Hornet, providing substantial improvements in both power and fuel economy. The A-6F would have had totally new avionics, including a Norden AN/APQ-173 synthetic aperture radar and multi-function cockpit displays – the APQ-173 would have given the Intruder air-to-air capacity with provision for the AIM-120 AMRAAM. Two additional wing pylons were added, for a total of seven stations.

Although five development aircraft were built, the U.S. Navy ultimately chose not to authorize the A-6F, preferring to concentrate on the A-12 Avenger II. This left the service in a quandary when the A-12 was canceled in 1991.

Grumman proposed a cheaper alternative in the A-6G, which had most of the A-6F's advanced electronics, but retained the existing engines. This, too, was canceled.

=== Electronic warfare versions ===
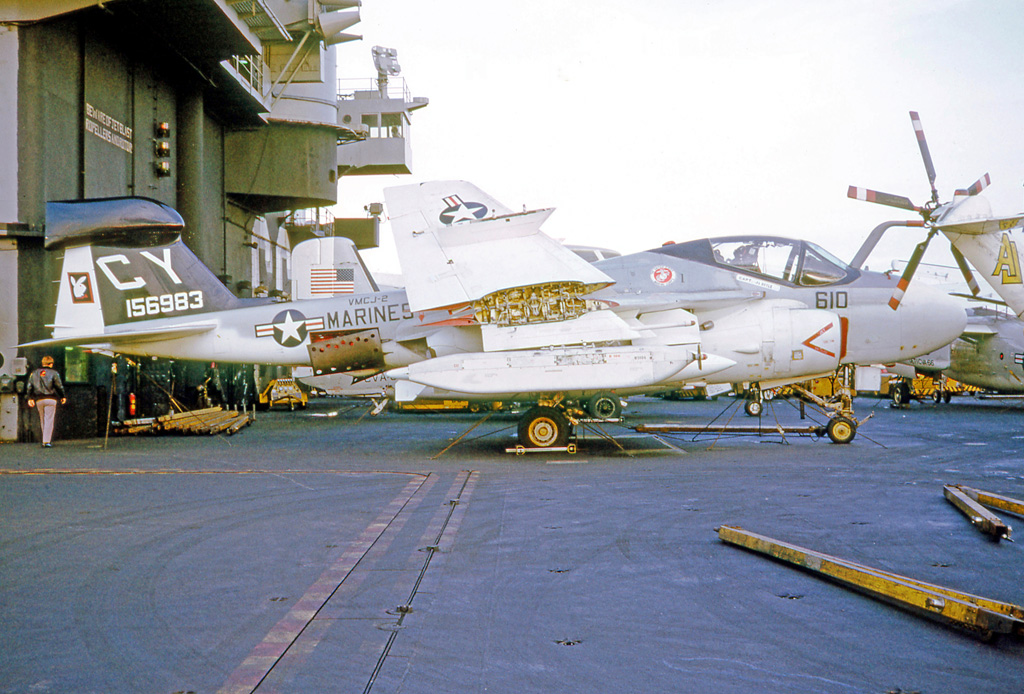
US Marine Corps EA-6A Intruder electronics aircraft of VMCJ-2 Playboys aboard USS America in 1974 during a visit to Scotland.

An electronic warfare (EW)/Electronic countermeasures (ECW) version of the Intruder was developed early in the aircraft's life for the USMC, which needed a new ECM platform to replace its elderly F3D-2Q Skyknights. An EW version of the Intruder, initially designated A2F-1H (rather than A2F-1Q, as "Q" was being split to relegate it to passive electronic warfare and "H" to active) and subsequently redesignated EA-6A, first flew on 26 April 1963. It had a Bunker-Ramo AN/ALQ-86 ECM suite, with most electronics contained on the walnut-shaped pod atop the vertical fin. They were equipped with AN/APQ-129 fire control radar, and theoretically capable of firing the AGM-45 Shrike anti-radiation missile, although they were apparently not used in that role. The navigational radar is AN/APN-153.

Only 28 EA-6As were built (2 prototypes, 15 new-build, and 11 conversions from A-6As), serving with U.S. Marine Corps squadrons in Vietnam. It was phased out of front line service in the mid-1970s, remaining in use in reserve VMCJ units with the USMC and then the United States Navy in specialized VAQ units, primarily for training purposes. The last EA-6A had been retired by 1993.

A much more highly specialized derivative of the Intruder was the EA-6B Prowler, having a "stretched" airframe with two additional systems operators, and more comprehensive systems for the electronic warfare and SEAD roles. A derivative of AN/APQ-156, AN/APS-130 was installed as the main radar for EA-6B. The navigational radar was upgraded to AN/APS-133 from the AN/APN-153 on EA-6A. In total, 170 were produced. The EA-6B took on the duties of the U.S. Air Force EF-111 Raven when the DoD decided to let the U.S. Navy handle all electronic warfare missions. The Prowler has been replaced by the EA-18G Growler in the U.S. Navy and was retired from USMC service in 2019.

=== Variant list ===
YA2F-1
Pre-production aircraft, eight built with the first four with rotating jet exhaust pipes, redesignated YA-6A in 1962.
A2F-1
First production variant with fixed tailpipe, 484 built, redesignated A-6A in 1962.
YA2F-1H
Prototype electronic warfare variant, one modified from A2F-1, redesignated YEA-6A in 1962.
A2F-1H
Electronic warfare variant of the A2F-1 redesignated EA-6A in 1962
YA-6A
Pre-production aircraft redesignated from YA2F-1 in 1962.
A-6A
First production variant redesignated from A2F-1 in 1962.
YEA-6A
One YA2F-1H electronic warfare variant prototype redesignated in 1962.
EA-6A
Electronic warfare variant redesignated from A2F-1H, had a redesigned fin and rudder and addition of an ECM radome, able to carry underwing ECM pods, three YA-6A and four A-6As converted and 21 built.
NA-6A
The redesignation of three YA-6As and three A-6As. The six aircraft were modified for special tests.
NEA-6A
One EA-6A aircraft was modified for special test purposes.
TA-6A
Proposed trainer variant with three-seat, not built.
A-6B
Variant fitted with avionics for the suppression of enemy air defenses (SEAD), 19 conversions from A-6A.
EA-6B Prowler
Electronic warfare variant of the A-6A with longer fuselage for four crew.
YEA-6B
The designation of two EA-6B prototypes, which were modified for special test purposes.
A-6C
A-6A conversion for low-level attack role with electro-optical sensors, twelve converted.
KA-6D
A-6A conversion for in–flight refueling, 58 converted.

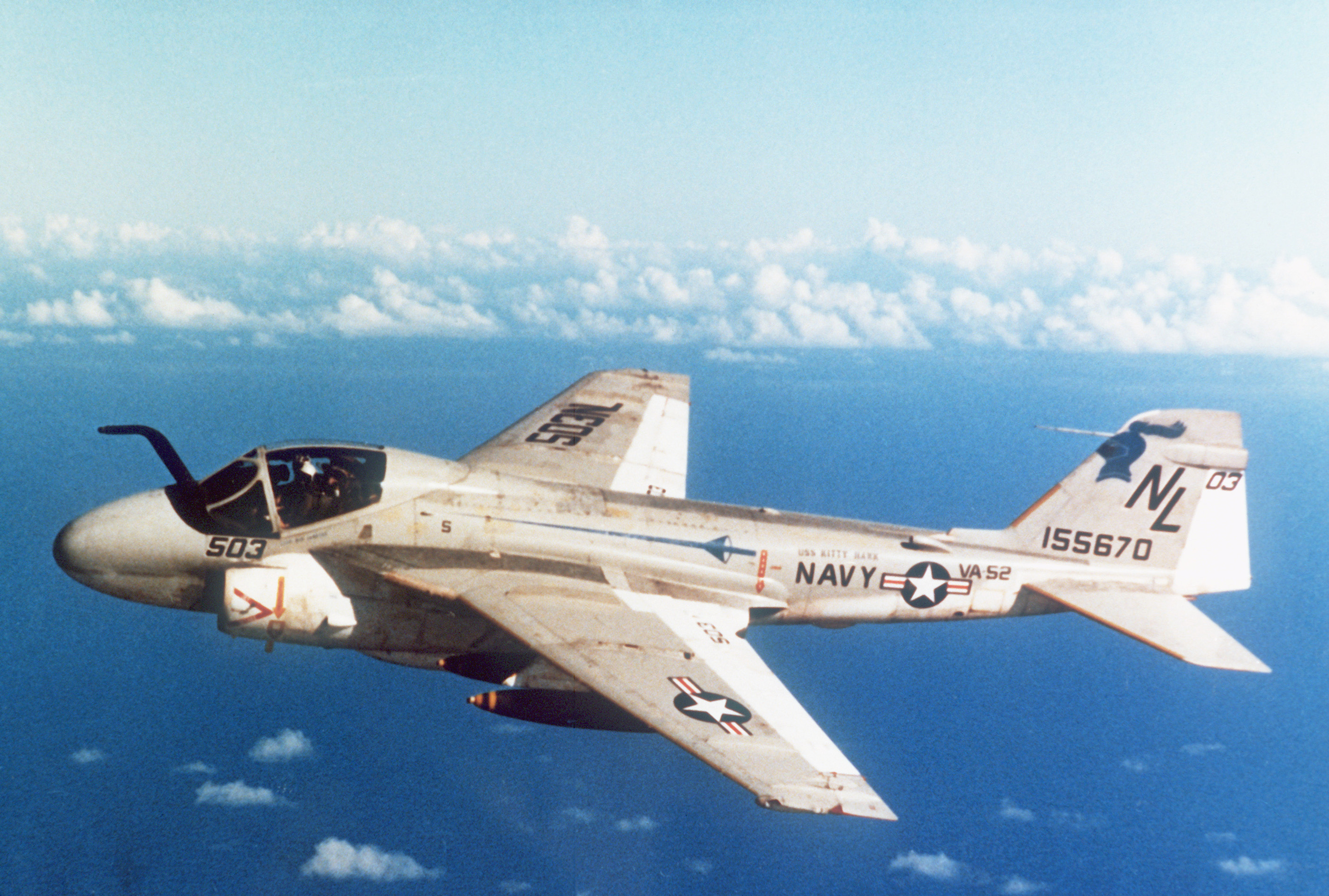
A-6E Intruder of VA-52, 1981

A-6E
A-6A with improved electronics.
A-6E TRAM
A-6E upgraded with the AN/AAS-33 Target Recognition Attack Multi-Sensor or "TRAM" pod. Capable of dropping laser guided bombs without a targeting pod. Can also carry the AGM-84 Harpoon.
A-6E SWIP
A-6E TRAM upgraded with the AN/ALR-67 RWR and ability to carry the AGM-88 HARM, AGM-62 Walleye, AGM-84E SLAM and AGM-65 Maverick. Several versions had new composite wings.
A-6F Intruder II
Advanced version with updated electronics and General Electric F404 turbofans; only 5 built.
A-6G
Proposed cheaper alternative to the A-6F, with its advanced electronics, but existing J52 turbojets.
G-128-12
Unbuilt single-seat A-6 based design proposal for the VA(L) competition for A-4 Skyhawk replacement based on existing design. Contract ultimately awarded to the LTV A-7 Corsair II.

== Operators ==
United States

- United States Navy (1963–1997)
- United States Marine Corps (1963–1993)

== Aircraft on display ==
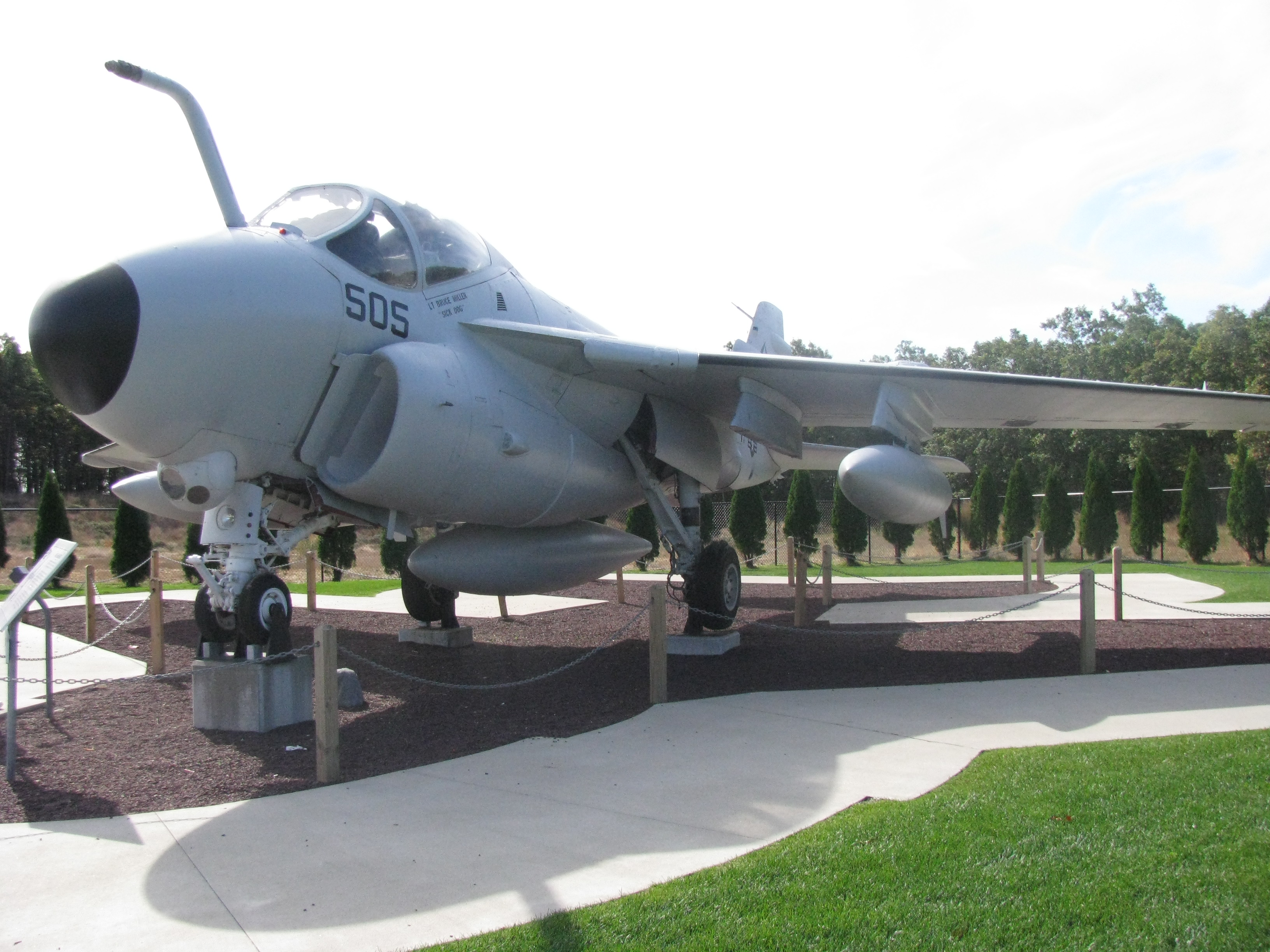
A Grumman A-6 Intruder on display at Grumman Memorial Park

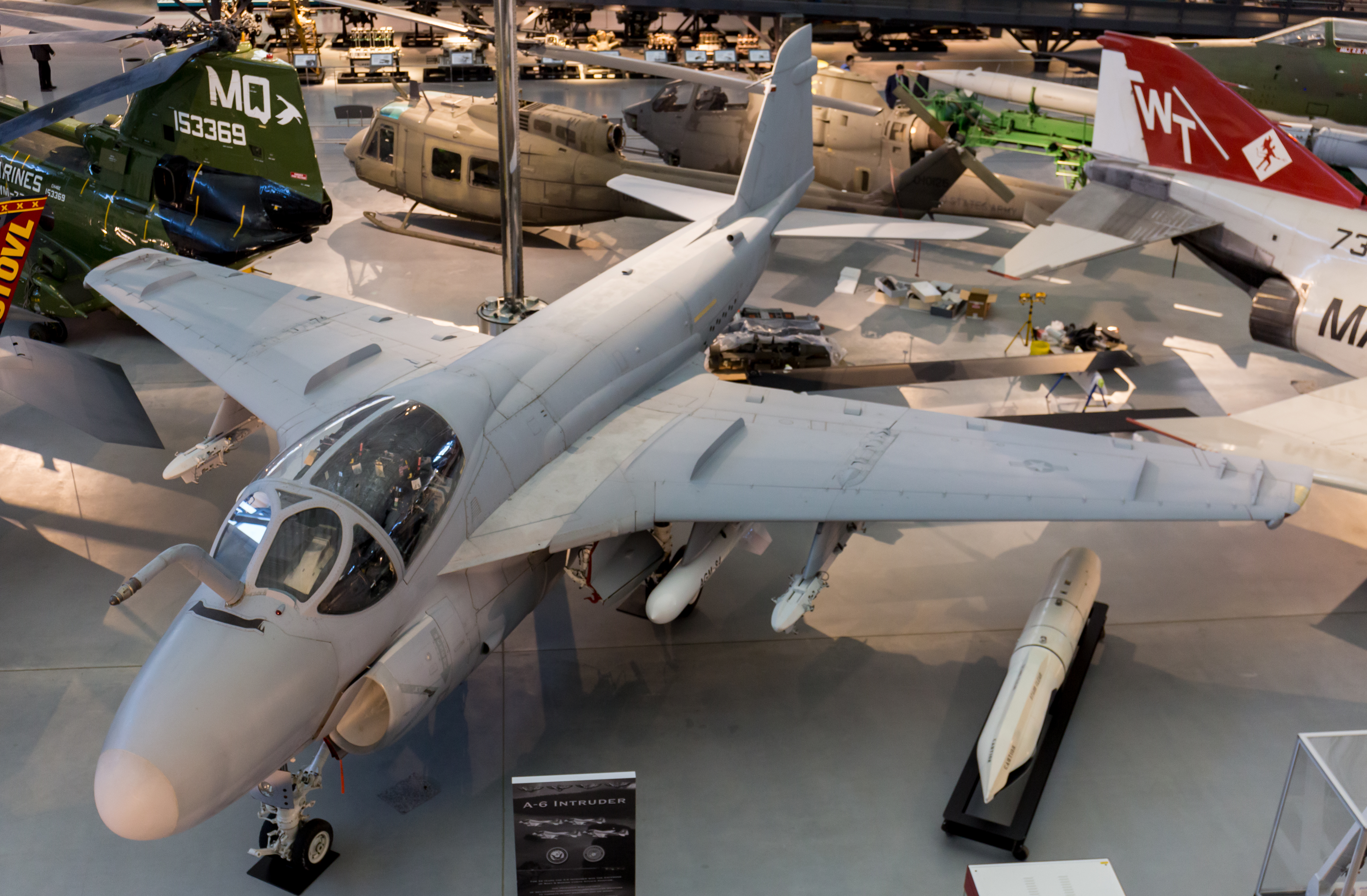
An A-6 Intruder on display at the Udvar-Hazy Center.

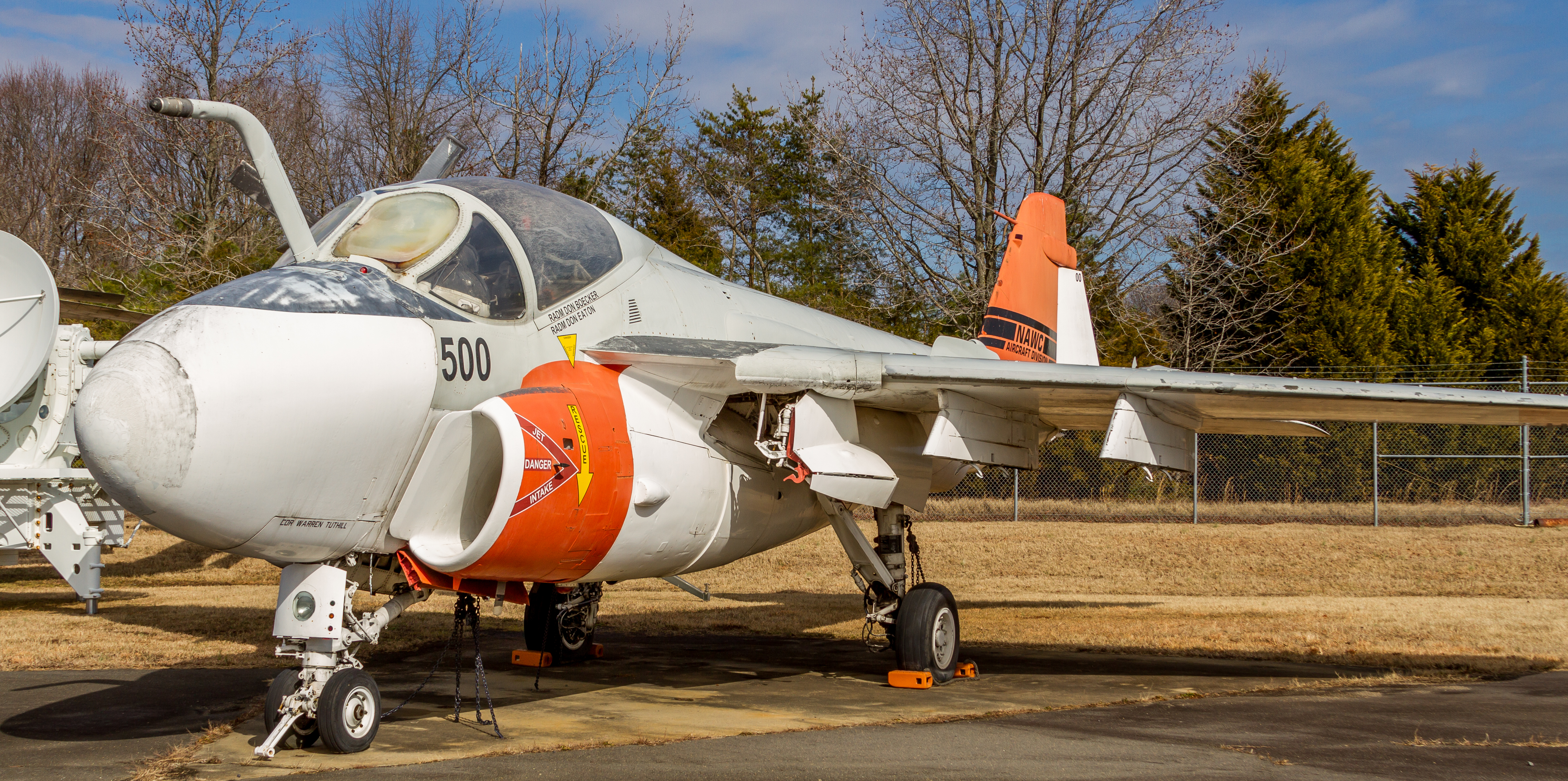
An A-6E Intruder on display at Patuxent River Naval Air Museum

YA-6A

- 147865 – Cherry Point Historical Aircraft Park, Havelock, North Carolina; displayed as an EA-6A.
- 147867 – Alleghany Arms & Armory Museum, Smethport, Pennsylvania

KA-6D

- 149482 – NAS Whidbey, Oak Harbor, Washington displayed as an A-6E.
- 151626 – Battleship Memorial Park, Mobile, Alabama
- 152910 – Oakland Aviation Museum, Oakland, California

A-6E

- 151782 – USS Midway Museum, San Diego, California
- 152599 – Patriots Point Naval & Maritime Museum, Mount Pleasant, South Carolina
- 152603 – Richmond Municipal Airport, Richmond, Indiana.
- 152907 – NAS Whidbey, Oak Harbor, Washington.
- 152923 – Norfolk Naval Station/Chambers Field (former NAS Norfolk), Norfolk, Virginia.
- 152935 – Empire State Aerosciences Museum, Glenville, New York
- 152936 – United States Naval Museum of Armament and Technology, NCC China Lake (North), Ridgecrest, California.
- 154131 – Walker Field Colorado Park, Grand Junction, Colorado.
- 154162 – Palm Springs Air Museum, Palm Springs, California
- 154167 – Steven F. Udvar-Hazy Center, NASM, Washington, D.C.
- 154170 – Flying Leatherneck Aviation Museum, MCAS Miramar, San Diego, California
- 154171 – Estrella Warbird Museum, Paso Robles, California
- 155595 – Pacific Coast Air Museum, Santa Rosa, California
- 155610 – National Naval Aviation Museum, NAS Pensacola, Pensacola, Florida
- 155627 – NAS Fallon, Fallon, Nevada.
- 155629 – Hickory Aviation Museum, Hickory NC
- 155644 – Yanks Air Museum, Chino, California
- 155648 – Aviation History & Technology Center, Dobbins ARB (formerly Atlanta NAS), Atlanta, Georgia.
- 155661 – Camp Blanding Museum and Memorial Park, Camp Blanding, Florida.
- 155713 – Pima Air & Space Museum (adjacent to Davis-Monthan AFB), Tucson, Arizona
- 156997 – Patuxent River Naval Air Museum, NAS Patuxent River, Lexington Park, Maryland.
- 157001 – Naval Inventory Control Point, Philadelphia, Pennsylvania.
- 157024 – Defense General Supply Center, Richmond, Virginia.
- 158532 – USS Lexington Museum, Corpus Christi, Texas
- 158794 – Museum of Flight, Seattle, Washington
- 159567 – Naval Surface Warfare Center Dahlgren Division, Dahlgren, Virginia.
- 159568 – Patuxent River NAS, Lexington Park, Maryland.
- 159579 – Castle Air Museum, Atwater, California
- 159901 – NAF El Centro, El Centro, California.
- 160995 – Yanks Air Museum, Chino, California
- 161676 – Lycoming County Veterans Memorial Park, Williamsport, Pennsylvania.
- 162182 – Valiant Air Command Warbird Museum, Space Coast Regional Airport, Titusville, Florida
- 162195 – San Diego Aerospace Museum, San Diego, California.
- 162206 – Oregon Air and Space Museum, Eugene, Oregon
- 164378 – Eastern Carolina Aviation Exhibit, Havelock, North Carolina.
- 164384 – Grumman Memorial Park, Long Island, New York.

A-6F

- 162184 – Cradle of Aviation Museum, Garden City, New York
- 162185 – Intrepid Sea-Air-Space Museum, New York City, New York

== Specifications (A-6E) ==
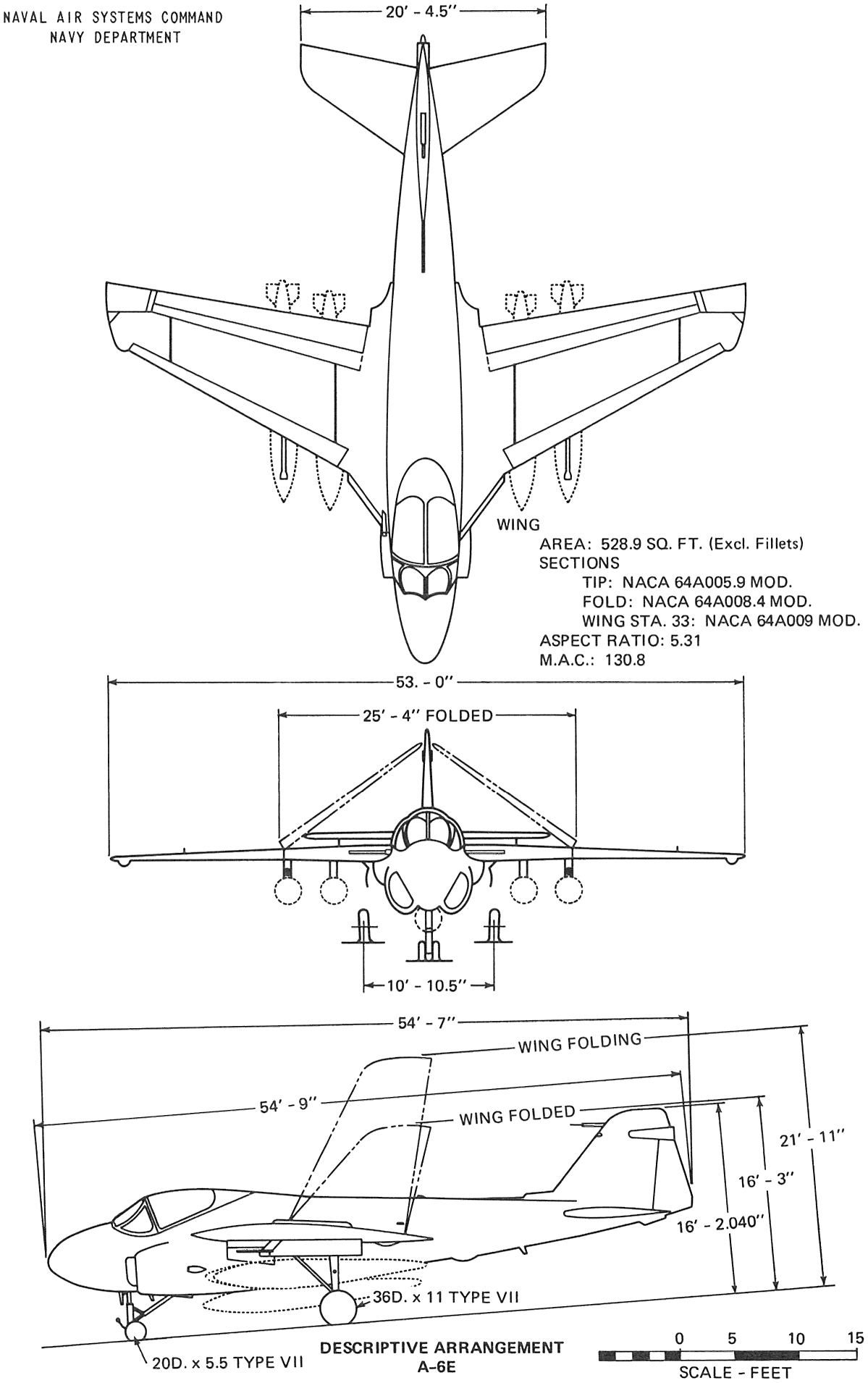
3-view line drawing of the Grumman A-6E Intruder

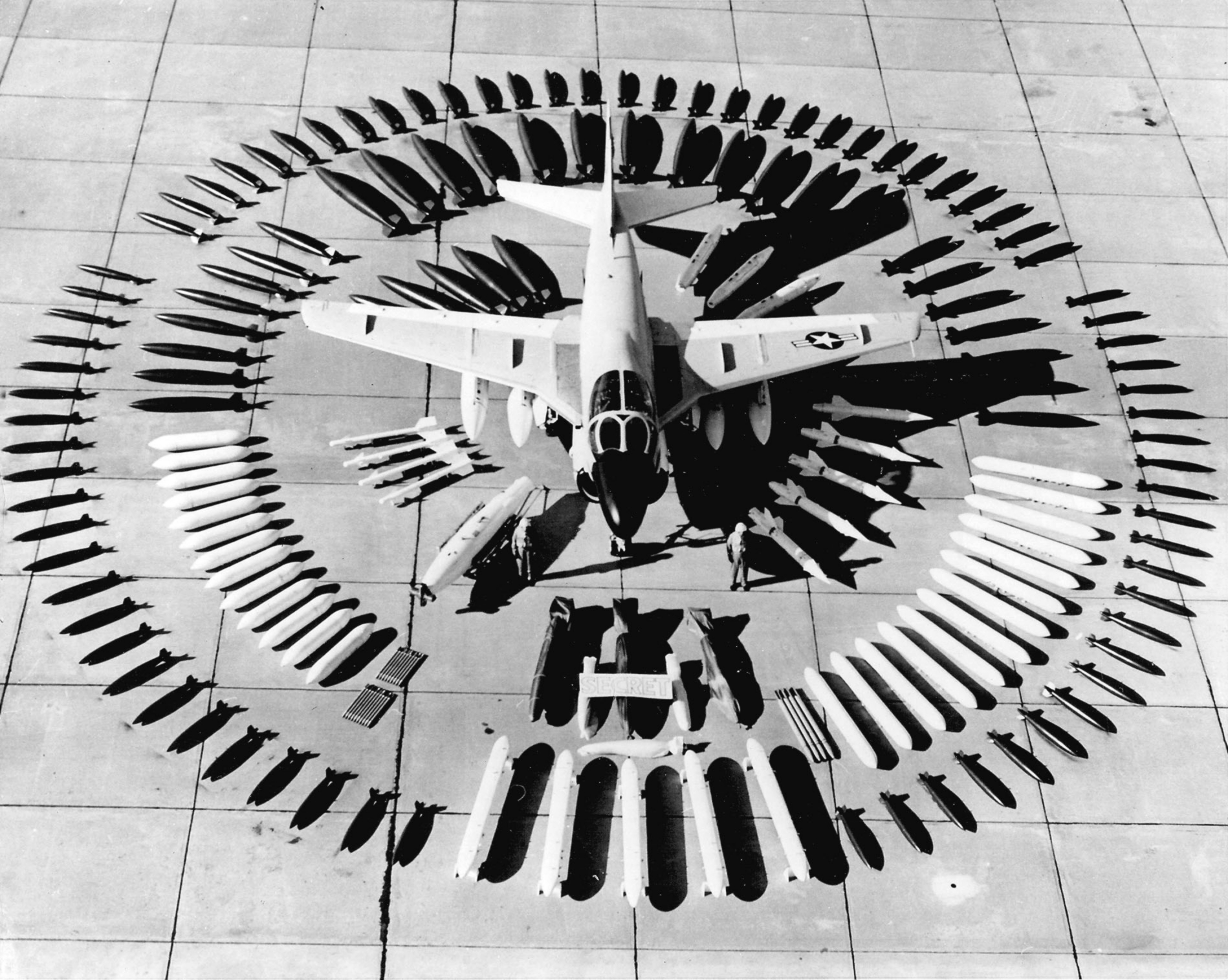
A-6 ordnance, 1962

Data from Jane's All The World's Aircraft 1982–83 Jet Bombers: From the Messerschmitt Me 262 to the Stealth B-2 A-6E Standard Aircraft Characteristics (SAC)

General characteristics

- Crew: 2 (pilot, bombardier/navigator)
- Length: 54 ft 9 in (16.69 m)
- Wingspan: 53 ft 0 in (16.15 m)
- Width: 25 ft 2 in (7.67 m) wing folded
- Height: 16 ft 2 in (4.93 m)
- Wing area: 528.9 sq ft (49.14 m^{2})
- Aspect ratio: 5.31:1
- Empty weight: 26,660 lb (12,093 kg)
- Max takeoff weight: 60,400 lb (27,397 kg) (shore-based operations)
- Fuel capacity: 2,385 US gal (1,986 imp gal; 9,030 L) (internal fuel)
- Zero-lift drag coefficient: 0.0144
- Powerplant: 2 × Pratt & Whitney J52-P8B turbojets, 9,300 lbf (41 kN) thrust each

Performance

- Maximum speed: 560 kn (640 mph, 1,040 km/h) at sea level
- Cruise speed: 412 kn (474 mph, 763 km/h)
- Stall speed: 98 kn (113 mph, 181 km/h) (flaps down)
- Never exceed speed: 700 kn (810 mph, 1,300 km/h)
- Combat range: 919 nmi (1,058 mi, 1,702 km) hi-lo-hi mission with 6× Mark 83 bombs and 3× drop tanks
  - 536 nmi (617 mi; 993 km) hi-lo-lo-hi interdiction mission (300 n.mi. ingress and egress runs at sea level) with 12× Mk 20 Rockeye II cluster bombs and 3× drop tanks
  - 556 nmi (640 mi; 1,030 km) close air support (1 hour loiter at 5000 ft over target) with 18× Mark 82 bombs and 2× drop tanks (Note: All figures assume tanks jettisoned when empty and include reserve fuel for 20 minute sea level loiter)
- Ferry range: 2,818 nmi (3,243 mi, 5,219 km)
- Service ceiling: 42,400 ft (12,900 m)
- g limits: -2.4 to 6.5
- Rate of climb: 7,620 ft/min (38.7 m/s)
- Lift-to-drag: 15.2
- Take-off run to 50 ft (15 m): 4,530 ft (1,380 m)
- Landing run from 50 ft (15 m): 2,540 ft (770 m)

Armament

- Hardpoints: Five hardpoints with a capacity of 3,600 lb (1,600 kg) each (4 under wings, 1 under fuselage), 18,000 lb (8,200 kg) total, with provisions to carry combinations of:
  - Rockets:
    - 12× LAU-10 4-round 5 inch (127 mm) Zuni pods
    - 12× LAU-68 7-round 2.75 inch (70 mm) FFAR pods
    - 12× LAU-61/LAU-68 19-round 2.75 inch (70 mm) FFAR pods
  - Missiles:
    - AGM-45 Shrike anti-radar missile × 2
    - AGM-78 Standard ARM anti-radar missile × 2
    - AGM-62 Walleye TV-guided glide bomb
    - AGM-65 Maverick air-to-ground missile × 6
    - AGM-84 Harpoon anti-ship missile/AGM-84E Standoff Land Attack Missile × 4
    - AGM-88 HARM anti-radar missile
    - AGM-123 Skipper air-to-ground missile
    - AIM-9 Sidewinder air-to-air missile
    - ADM-141 TALD decoy missiles
  - Bombs:
    - 28× Mk 82 500 lb (227 kg) GP bombs or Mk 20 Rockeye II cluster bomb (Note: Which technically capable of carrying 30 bombs, the rear inboard position of the Multiple Ejector Racks on hardpoints 2 and 4 (internal wing) had to be left clear to allow the landing gear to retract freely.)
    - 13× Mk 83 1,000 lb (454 kg) GP bombs
    - 5× Mk 84 2,000 lb (907 kg) GP bombs
    - 5× GBU-12/16/10 laser-guided bombs
    - 5× CBU-72 Fuel-Air Explosives
    - Up to three B43, B57 or B61 nuclear weapons
  - Other:
    - Mk 60 Captor Mine
    - Up to 5× 300 US gal (250 imp gal; 1,100 L) drop tanks
    - Various practice stores, chaff launchers, baggage pods, flares

== See also ==
Related development

- Northrop Grumman EA-6B Prowler

Aircraft of comparable role, configuration, and era

- Blackburn Buccaneer
- Dassault-Breguet Super Étendard
- Sukhoi Su-17

Related lists

- List of accidents and incidents involving the Grumman A-6 Intruder
- List of attack aircraft
- List of military aircraft of the United States
- List of United States military aerial refueling aircraft
- List of military electronics of the United States
