= List of accidents and incidents involving the Grumman A-6 Intruder =

Aviation accident list

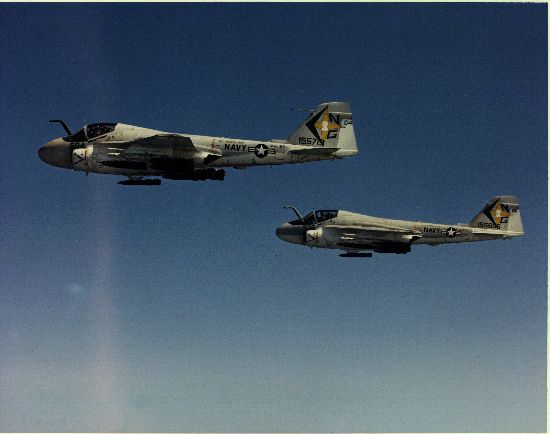
Two Grumman A-6A Intruders of Attack Squadron 165 in flight, 1973.

This list is of accidents and incidents involving the Grumman A-6 Intruder, in service with the U.S. Navy and Air Force from 1963-1997, that resulted in ejection, loss of life, severe injuries, or irreparable damage to the aircraft.

== 1966 ==
=== 20 June ===
A-6A Intruder BuNo 152605 was destroyed on June 20, 1966, when it collided with A-6A Intruder BuNo 152602, also of VMA(AW)-242, US Marine Corps. The two planes were on a bombing practice on the Tangier Target Range. After the last practice run, during the join-up, aircraft BuNo 152605 struck BuNo 152602 in its wing root area. One aircraft crashed into Chesapeake Bay, Virginia; the other caught fire and crashed into a housing area of Buckroe Beach, Virginia, killing a mother and her baby on the ground as well as injuring over 40 people on the ground.

From an Associated Press article, dated 21 June 1966:

Hampton, Va., (AP) — Officials said today they were convinced there were no more dead or injured in the rubble of a suburban neighborhood devastated by the flaming crash of a Marine Corps attack bomber hurtling from an in-flight collision. Police said two persons—a 30 year old mother, MARY GALLANT and her 19-month-old son DONALD - died. Forty-four persons were treated for injuries, mainly burns. Ten remained hospitalized. Sixty persons were left homeless in the total destruction of 10 houses and damage to 17 others. None Reported Missing. Hampton Police Chief L. H. Nicholson said, "We have gone through all the destroyed and damaged houses and found no additional bodies. I don't believe we will find any more. We have no reports of missing persons." Nicholson and Fire Marshall F. F. Hopkins both used the same terms to describe their feelings about the light loss of life in such a densely populated area - "miraculous." The two-seater A6 Intruder light bomber plowed into the development at 8:57 p.m. Monday night. Seconds earlier, it had collided at 400 miles an hour with another Intruder at 2,000 feet. The other plane fell into Chesapeake Bay. Path Clearly Marked. The evidence of the plane's path was clearly marked. The jet swept in on a northeast heading, clipped a 50-foot oak tree at midpoint and sheared off a side of the GALLANT'S shingle cottage. The bodies of MRS. GALLANT and her son were found in the kitchen. All of the four Marines aboard the two aircraft ejected safely and landed near the second bomber in Chesapeake Bay off Norfolk. Three were picked up by a Coast Guard helicopter, the fourth by a private boat. The crash occurred not far from the sprawling Fordham shopping center and the homes of many Air Force and Army men from nearby Langley Air Force Base and Ft. Monroe. Engine Buried In Crater. Witnesses said the aircraft came down at a 45-degree angle just off Sergeant Street, where its engine buried itself in a deep crater. The wings and portions of the flaming fuselage continued on, with parts of the fuel tanks, for two blocks, mowing down homes as they went and setting some of them on fire. Bits of the plane were found 5 blocks away at the shopping center, where a wheel plunged through the roof of a bowling alley and injured three persons. MRS. GALLANT'S husband was on his way home when the house in which his wife and infant son awaited his arrival was destroyed. Two other Gallant children were visiting neighbors and escaped. The marine bombers, out of Cherry Point, N.C., were en route to Patuxent River, Md., and had left their base at 6:30 p.m. The Fleet Marine Force Atlantic said it had no immediate explanation for the collision and that the planes were on a routine weather mission. Moments after the pilotless bomber crashed in flames, ambulances were speeding to the area from Hampton, Newport News, Buckroe Beach, Langley AFB, Phoebus, and the counties of Northampton and York. Rescue squadmen, doctors, detachments from Langley and Ft. Monroe, and firemen hurried in. By the time they arrived, hundreds of persons had gathered to watch the holocaust. Police sealed off the area to prevent possible looting and servicemen from nearby military bases patrolled the area. Power company workers labored throughout the night to restore electricity in an estimated 500 homes. Wearing helmets, they bobbed up and down to the tops of utility poles in aerial lifts under the big floodlights. The burned-out hulks of half a dozen automobiles, plus clothing, bedsheets, dishes, pots and pans and every conceivable type of house furniture were scattered around.

== 1967 ==
=== 23 March ===
The worst ground aviation accident of the Vietnam War occurred at Da Nang Air Base, South Vietnam, when a traffic controller cleared a USMC Grumman A-6A Intruder, BuNo 152608, of VMA(AW)-242, MAG-11, for takeoff but also cleared a USAF Lockheed C-141A-LM Starlifter, 65-9407, of the 62nd Military Airlift Wing, McChord AFB, Washington, to cross the runway. The A-6 crew saw Starlifter at the last moment and veered off the runway to try to avoid it, but the port wing sliced through the C-141's nose, which immediately caught fire. A load of 72 acetylene gas cylinders ignited and caused a tremendous explosion, with only the loadmaster escaping through the rear hatch. The Intruder overturned and skidded down the runway on its back, but both crewmembers, Capt. Frederick Cone and Capt. Doug Wilson, survived and crawled out of the smashed canopy after the jet stopped. Some of the ordnance load of 16 X 500 lb. bombs and six rocket packs went off in the ensuing fire. The Military Airlift Command crew killed are Capt. Harold Leland Hale, Capt. Leroy Edward Leonard, Capt. Max Paul Starkel, S/Sgt. Alanson Garland Bynum, and S/Sgt. Alfred Funck. This is the first of two C-141s lost during the conflict, and one of only three strategic airlifters written off during the Vietnam War.

== 1971 ==
=== 15 November ===
A U.S. Navy Grumman A-6A Intruder, BuNo. 151563, of VA-42, on a maintenance test flight out of NAS Oceana, Virginia, suffered a failure of the drogue chute gun in the pilot's ejection seat, pulling the two ejection seat cables and ejecting Lt. Dalton C. Wright. The bombardier-navigator, Lt. John W. Adair, with no pilot in the aircraft, was forced to eject. The jet came down 15 miles from Oceana. The Navy investigation later determined that five or six flight accidents and one hangar accident may have been caused by the same problem.

== 1973 ==
=== 19 September ===
A U.S. Navy Grumman A-6A Intruder, BuNo 155721, 'NJ,' of VA-128, out of NAS Whidbey Island, Washington, crashed in the Oregon desert, approximately 25 miles SE of Christmas Valley, Oregon, during a low-level night training mission. The pilot Lt. Alan G. Koehler, 27, and navigator Lt. Cdr. Philip D. du Hamel, 33, were killed while flying. On 14 June 2007, the Bureau of Land Management (BLM) officially declared the crash scene a historic federal government site at a Flag Day ceremony. An interpretive plaque was unveiled during this event, reflecting this designation and depicting the historical significance of the location.

== 1991 ==
=== 10 October ===
A U.S. Navy A-6E Intruder BuNo. 152620/NE-407 of VA-155, US Navy, based at Whidbey Island NAS, crashed into the Columbia River, 12 miles southeast of Wenatchee, Chelan County, Washington. Both cremembers—Lt.t Commander Dan David "Dewey" DeWispelaere (pilot) and L.t (JG) Grady Hackwith (bombardier/navigator— were killed.

"Lt. Cmdr. Dan David "Dewey" DeWispelaere, 32, a Navy pilot who flew more than 40 missions from the aircraft carrier Ranger in the Persian Gulf War, was killed Oct. 10 in the crash of his A-6E Intruder near Wenatchee, Wash.

His navigator-bombardier, Lt. (j.g.) Grady Hackwith, was also killed. The plane was based at the Naval Air Station at Whidbey Island, Wash., and was on a low-level training flight when it crashed into a cliff and fell into the Columbia River about 12 miles southeast of Wenatchee. Navy officials said the cause of the crash was under investigation."

== 1994 ==
=== 5 April ===
A U.S. Navy A-6E Intruder out of Alameda Naval Air Station crashed in San Francisco Bay. 33-year-old reservist pilot Lt. Cmdr. Rand McNally and his navigator Lt. Cmdr. Brian McMahon were killed in the crash. The pair perished while making a turn to land at the base. An investigation later found that the aircraft suffered from numerous mechanical problems, which likely contributed to the incident.

== 1998 ==
=== 3 February ===
An EA-6B cut the cable car support of an aerial lift, leaving 20 dead in the Cavalese cable car disaster (1998)

== See also ==
- List of accidents and incidents involving military aircraft (1960–74)
- List of accidents and incidents involving military aircraft (1990–1999)
