= 1949 Queensland Airlines Lockheed Lodestar crash =

Air disaster in Queensland, Australia

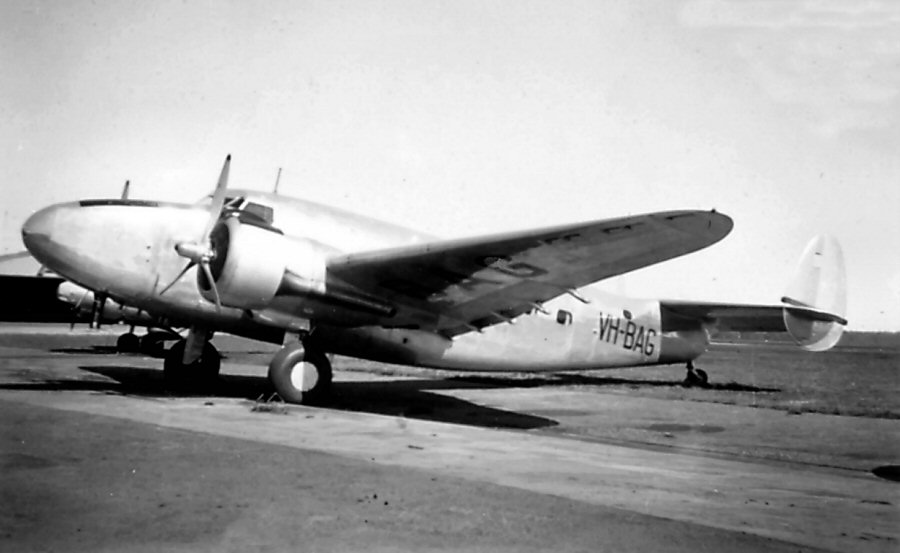
- VH-BAG, the aircraft involved in the accident

Accident
- Date: 10 March 1949
- Summary: Impact with the ground after takeoff
- Site: Bilinga Queensland, Australia; 28.1638°S 153.5113°E
- Registration: VH-BAG
- Passengers: 18
- Crew: 3
- Fatalities: 21
- Survivors: 0

External image
- Newspaper cover page

On 10 March 1949 a Lockheed Lodestar aircraft became airborne at Coolangatta, Queensland, Australia for a flight to Brisbane. Before reaching a height of 300 feet (90 m) it suddenly pitched nose-up, stalled and crashed onto its belly beyond the end of the airstrip.

Fuel from the aircraft's tanks caught fire and the aircraft burned fiercely. All 21 people on board died, either of injuries during the crash or in the ensuing conflagration. It was the worst civil aviation accident in Queensland at the time, (Note: It remained the worst civil aviation accident in Queensland until 1960 when Trans Australia Airlines Flight 538, a Fokker F27 Friendship, crashed into the sea at night while preparing to land at Mackay, killing all 29 people on board.) and the second-worst accident in Australia. It occurred exactly three years after the worst, the ANA DC-3 crash near Hobart on 10 March 1946. (Note: On 10 March 1949 a Douglas DC-3 crashed into the sea shortly after take-off from Hobart, killing all 25 people on board.)

Investigation of the crash uncovered some errors in the information used to determine the position of the aircraft's centre of gravity. It became clear that the aircraft had taken off with its centre of gravity slightly outside the approved limits. Investigators also found evidence that the takeoff may have been performed with the elevator trim tab still set for landing. If the elevator trim tab had not been set for takeoff this would have been exacerbated by the incorrect position of the centre of gravity and the aircraft would have been uncontrollable.

== The flight ==
Queensland Airlines used Lockheed Lodestar VH-BAG to conduct a regular passenger service between Brisbane, Casino, Coffs Harbour, Coolangatta and Brisbane. VH-BAG arrived at Bilinga airstrip, on the outskirts of Coolangatta, from Coffs Harbour with 11 of its 16 passenger seats occupied. Some passengers left the aircraft at Bilinga and others boarded for the flight of 45 nautical miles (83 km) to Archerfield Airport in Brisbane. (Note: The day after the accident, newspapers stated that two passengers left the aircraft at Bilinga and eight boarded but later this was increased to nine. Air Crash, published in 1992, states that four passengers left the aircraft at Bilinga and eleven boarded.)

The aircraft was parked at the Queensland Airlines terminal for about a quarter of an hour before departing at 11:15 am local time. On board were 16 adult passengers and 2 infants, 2 pilots and an air hostess. All passenger seats were occupied. (Note: VH-BAG was configured with seating for 16 passengers. There were 18 passengers on board – 12 men, 4 women, and 2 infants travelling with their parents. The infants were aged 2½ years and 1 year, and were seated on their parents' laps. It was permissible for an infant under 3 years of age to be seated with an adult.) Observers saw the aircraft taxi to the end of the strip, turn around and promptly commence its take-off run. (Note: In 1949 Bilinga airstrip comprised three unpaved strips. Two of the strips have since been developed into the two runways of the present-day Gold Coast Airport. The original east-west strip no longer exists as a runway but part of it has been developed into a taxiway. Sources differ as to which strip was used for take-off by VH-BAG on its final flight. The day after the accident, newspapers stated the aircraft took off into the south-east towards Kirra Hill. Air Crash, published in 1992, states that take-off occurred into the east towards the beach.)

== The crash ==
The take-off appeared to be normal until the undercarriage was retracted. The aircraft quickly pitched nose-up into an almost vertical attitude. First the aircraft rolled to the right until the wing was almost vertical, then it rolled to the left. The aircraft reached a height estimated to be between 200 and 300 feet (60 and 90 m) and then began descending and curving to the left. It continued to descend until it crashed onto its belly, tree stumps tearing open the underside of the left wing and the fuselage beneath the cabin door. The aircraft slid for only about 20 yards (18 m) before stopping about 100 yards (91 m) beyond the end of the strip. (Note: The day after the accident, newspapers stated the aircraft reached a height between 100 and 500 feet (30 and 152 m); and the location of the crash was 200 yards (180 m) beyond the end of the strip from which it had taken off.) It came to rest in the shallow waters of a swamp at the edge of the airstrip. Within seconds of the crash, flame and black smoke erupted from the wreckage.

Only a small number of people were at the airstrip and saw the crash. The airport groundsman and an airline staff member grabbed portable fire extinguishers, jumped into a car and raced across the airstrip. Others at the airstrip and nearby beaches ran towards the burning aircraft. The aircraft's cabin door had been torn away by a tree stump and lay about 30 feet (10 m) behind the aircraft but despite the open doorway no-one inside the passenger cabin attempted to escape. Fuel floating on the surface of the water was burning fiercely, making it dangerous to approach the wreckage. One of the first witnesses to reach the scene believed he saw two people at the front of the passenger cabin who were alive but before he could get close enough to investigate he was driven back by flames. (Note: The witness was Mr M. Robinson who was holidaying at Coolangatta and made his way across the swampy ground to get to the crash.)

A fire engine from Coolangatta arrived within minutes of the crash. The boggy swamp made it difficult to manoeuvre the vehicle close to the wreckage. Firemen initially attacked the fire with portable fire extinguishers and then used the fire engine to pump water from the swamp onto the blazing wreckage. Two firemen found a way around the burning fuel on the surface of the water and climbed onto the wing with their hose. (Note: The two firemen were Chief Officer J.H. Windle and volunteer fireman B. Skelton.) The fire burned fiercely for 30 minutes but was not completely extinguished for another hour. (Note: One source states the fire burned for 1½ hours before being extinguished. Another source states the fire burned fiercely for 30 minutes and was finally extinguished 15 minutes later.) Apart from the outer wings and the tail section, little of the aircraft was recognisable. Both halves of the tailplane were visibly bent downwards. The wreckage of the wings and engine mounts also showed they had suffered severe downward bending indicating the severity of the impact. The charred body of one of the pilots was half-way out a cockpit window, suggesting he survived the crash and attempted to escape from the wreckage.

At 3:15 pm police, ambulance and volunteers began to remove the bodies of victims from the wreckage. By 4:30 pm 20 bodies had been recovered. All were burned beyond recognition. Searching for the body of the final victim, a rope was attached to the row of burned seats and a truck was used to move the seat row. Underneath the seats was the body of a man, almost submerged under the water, his face protected by the swamp water and still recognisable.

== Investigation ==
The Director-General of Civil Aviation (Note: From 1946 until 1955 the Director-General of Civil Aviation was Air Marshal Richard Williams (RAAF retired.) He was knighted in 1954.) immediately appointed an investigation panel comprising specialists from the Department of Civil Aviation. Evidence from eyewitnesses led the panel to conclude that the aircraft climbed to a height of less than 500 feet (150 m) and then stalled. (Note: Estimates of the maximum height reached by the aircraft ranged from 100 to 300 feet (30 to 90 m), up to 500 feet (150 m).) An initial investigation of the aircraft showed no evidence of any failure in the control system. The throttles were fully open, the magneto switches on, and the propellers in fine pitch. The undercarriage was retracted, but the flaps were extended 15°. The disposition of the cables on the trim tab mechanism showed a setting typical of a landing.

In its report the panel stated the accident was caused by the aircraft being loaded so its centre of gravity was behind the rear limit. (Note: All aircraft have a forward limit and a rear limit to the position of the aircraft's centre of gravity. For adequate controllability of the aircraft it is important that the centre of gravity lies between the forward and rear limits prior to take-off and throughout the flight.) The report also stated that incorrect setting of the elevator trim tab may have been a contributory cause.

The rear limit for the centre of gravity was 39% of Mean Aerodynamic Chord. The load sheet prepared for the fatal flight indicated the centre of gravity of VH-BAG was at 39.2% of Mean Aerodynamic Chord. The load sheet was based on a load chart prepared by the Department of Civil Aviation and based on information supplied by the RAAF. During the investigation, inquiries were made with the US Civil Aeronautics Administration and this revealed an error in the load chart. The main undercarriage of the Lockheed Lodestar retracted to the rear so that retraction caused the centre of gravity to move rearwards but this was not taken into account in the design of the load chart. Other errors also came to light. The passenger seats were 1 inch (25 mm) further apart than shown on the load chart, causing the centre of gravity to be further to the rear than calculated, especially when the aircraft was fully loaded. Up to 18 kilograms (40 lb) of food and beverages for the passengers were stored at the rear of the passenger cabin but were not taken into account on the load chart. Investigation of the accident concluded that after the aircraft's undercarriage retracted, the centre of gravity would have been at about 43.4% of Mean Aerodynamic Chord. (Note: The exact position of the aircraft's centre of gravity could not be determined with accuracy but after the main undercarriage was retracted it was likely to have been between 43.4% and 43.9% of Mean Aerodynamic Chord.) With the centre of gravity 4% of MAC behind the rear limit the aircraft would have been tail-heavy and longitudinally unstable.

The aircraft had been in daily civil operations in Australia since November 1946 so the investigators assumed there must have been numerous flights with the centre of gravity significantly more than 39% of Mean Aerodynamic Chord. (Note: Takeoff in the Lodestar was normally made with the elevator trim set to 10 divisions nose-down. Some Queensland Airlines pilots had experienced takeoff with less than 10 divisions of nose-down trim and they reported that the aircraft pitched nose-up and climbed too steeply until more nose-down trim was applied. Pilots with Queensland Airlines used standardised verbal checks prior to takeoff and landing. Queensland Airlines did not have check lists.) It was necessary for the investigators to find something unique about the fatal flight of VH-BAG that would explain its sudden climb immediately after take-off and the pilot's inability to regain control and prevent the aircraft crashing. The aircraft's tailplane was one of the few parts of the aircraft not destroyed by fire. The position of the elevator trim tab spool appeared to be in the normal position for landing rather than a typical position for take-off. (Note: After the crash the elevator trim tab spool appeared to be in the position associated with 3 divisions nose-up, a typical setting for landing, instead of 10 divisions nose-down which was used for take-off with flaps set at 15°.) The investigators concluded that on the final takeoff it was likely that the elevator trim tab was still set for landing. This, coupled with the aircraft being tail-heavy and longitudinally unstable after undercarriage retraction, caused the aircraft to pitch nose-up so strongly that the pilot was unable to retain control or prevent the aircraft stalling.

Minister for Civil Aviation Arthur Drakeford made a public announcement that the accident had occurred because the aircraft was tail-heavy and unstable as the result of incorrect loading. The Minister said the operator had not taken adequate steps to ensure safe loading of its aircraft and he hinted that stricter regulation of the loading of aircraft was being considered.

The Minister announced that a public inquiry into the accident was unnecessary because the exact cause had been determined by his Department's investigation. He also refused to make public the investigation panel's report. This secrecy attracted criticism.

== Inquest ==
Post-mortem examinations were performed on the bodies. In addition to varying degrees of incineration, fractures of the skull, legs, arms and wrists were found. Even if the aircraft had not caught fire, a number of the occupants would have died from injuries they received in the crash. (Note: Post-mortem examinations of the bodies were performed by Dr Merrick John Justyn O'Reilly. It was O'Reilly's opinion that at least some of the occupants received fatal injuries in the impact. Air Crash, published in 1992, states that all the victims died instantly in the impact with the ground.)

An inquest into the deaths of the 21 occupants was conducted by the Southport District Coroner Mr P.W. Shepherd. The inquest was conducted over a period of 16 days, making it Queensland's longest-running coronial inquest. The inquest heard from 22 witnesses.

Counsel representing the aircraft operator, Queensland Airlines, asked that the report of the investigation panel be made available to him. (Note: At the Coroner's inquest, Queensland Airlines was represented by Mr W.G. Mack and Mr M. Hanger.) He complained that the report was critical of Queensland Airlines and yet he did not have the opportunity to read it, test its validity or cross-examine members of the investigation panel. He also complained about the implication that Queensland Airlines was guilty of causing the crash and said legal counsel for some of the parties were using the Coroner's inquest to prepare for legal action against Queensland Airlines. He interrupted evidence being presented by a member of the Department's investigation panel to ask that the panel's report be made available. Counsel representing the Department of Civil Aviation (Note: At the Coroner's inquest, the Department of Civil Aviation was represented by Mr M.V. Fogarty.) passed this request to the Director-General of Civil Aviation but the Director-General's response was that the report was not to be made available to legal representatives or the public.

The Queensland Attorney-General, Mr Devries, announced that Coroners' reports were confidential and for the benefit of the Attorney-General. He said the report by Mr Shepherd into the deaths of 21 people at Bilinga airstrip on 10 March would not be made public. This decision attracted criticism.

=== Aircraft loading ===
Queensland Airlines and its agents did not have weighing scales for use with passengers and luggage. The Traffic Manager for Queensland Airlines (Note: The Traffic Manager for Queensland Airlines was Mr Desmond William Leigh.) advised that sets of weighing scales had been purchased but were not in use because they had not been approved by the Department of Weights and Measures. He said that at every port other than Bilinga passengers could use some other company's weighing scales, and passengers intending to board at Bilinga could use the weighing scales at the nearby railway station. Staff of Queensland Airlines at Bilinga asked passengers to estimate their weight. The company allotted particular seats to its passengers but passengers did not always occupy the seats allotted to them.

The weight of the aircraft at the time of take-off was within the maximum limit specified in its certificate of airworthiness. (Note: The maximum weight specified on the certificate of airworthiness was 16,800 pounds (7,620 kg). The loaded weight of VH-BAG was determined to have been approximately 16,810 pounds (7,625 kg) but up to 50 pounds (23 kg) of fuel would have been consumed during engine running and taxying.) After the undercarriage retracted, the aircraft's centre of gravity was behind the rear limit by between 4.3% and 4.9% of Mean Aerodynamic Chord.

The Chief Pilot of Queensland Airlines (Note: After the death of Captain Keegan, Captain Maurice Bevan Mitchell became the Chief Pilot of Queensland Airlines.) told the inquest he did not believe the accident was caused by incorrect loading of the aircraft. He said the load sheet showed the aircraft's centre of gravity was at 39.2% of Mean Aerodynamic Chord and therefore only slightly outside the approved limit. He said if the aircraft's centre of gravity was significantly behind its rear limit the pilot would become aware of it before the aircraft left the ground. It was his opinion that some other mechanical problem must have occurred to cause the accident.

=== Air hostess ===
The body of the air hostess was found in the cockpit rather than near the hostess's seat at the rear of the passenger cabin. The Chief Pilot of Queensland Airlines suggested the pilot would have examined the waybill and would have been aware the aircraft was tail-heavy. It was likely he asked the air hostess to sit in the cockpit during the take-off to eliminate the tail-heaviness. The Chief Pilot told the inquest the loading chart indicated that if the air hostess had been sitting in the cockpit the aircraft's centre of gravity would have been within the approved limits.

=== Pilot competency ===
The pilot and co-pilot on the fatal flight both had substantial experience with the armed services before joining Queensland Airlines. (Note: The pilot was Captain Ronald Cook. The co-pilot was Captain James Murtha.) Since joining the company the pilot had accumulated about another 2300 hours, and the co-pilot about another 1700 hours. The Chief Pilot of Queensland Airlines told the inquest that both were excellent aviators.

=== The Keegan family ===
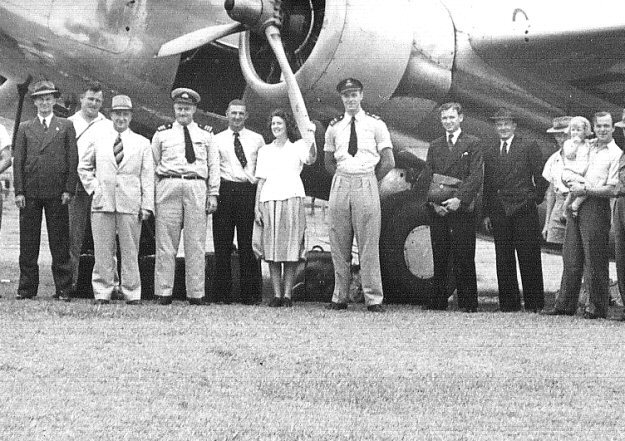
Photo taken just before the accident, the tall pilot in the middle is Captain Harry Keegan.

Four of the passengers on the fatal flight were from one family. Captain Harold Keegan, his wife and their two infant sons aged 2½ years and 1 year boarded the aircraft at Bilinga to return to Archerfield. They had been holidaying at nearby Coolangatta. Captain Keegan was the Chief Pilot for Queensland Airlines.

The Traffic Manager for Queensland Airlines, Mr Desmond Leigh, had flown from Brisbane to Bilinga airstrip earlier in the day and wanted to fly back to Brisbane. All seats were reserved so he decided to off-load Captain Keegan. There were allegations that Mr Leigh may have argued with the pilot about being allowed to board the flight in place of Captain Keegan. There was also an allegation that Mr Leigh boarded the Lodestar and only left when chased off by the pilot. This may have been significant to the investigation of the crash if an argument so distracted the pilots that they omitted to properly set the elevator trim prior to take-off. Mr Leigh told the inquest that when he learned Captain Keegan was travelling with his wife and two children he changed his decision and allowed Captain Keegan to accompany his family. He said he decided to return to Brisbane by train. Another witness also denied there had been an argument between Mr Leigh and the pilot. (Note: The witness was Donald Coutts Piddington.)

Captain Keegan and his wife boarded the plane and each placed one of their sons on their lap. The inquest was concerned that as the Keegan family boarded the flight at Bilinga airstrip their weights, and particularly the weight of Captain Keegan, (Note: Prior to loading of VH-BAG, staff of Queensland Airlines at Bilinga allowed a weight of 12 stone (168 lb 76 kg) for Captain Keegan and one child. The inquest heard that Captain Keegan weighed 14 stone (196 lb 89 kg). The weight of the Keegan infants was unknown.) may not have been properly taken into account in determining the position of the centre of gravity.

== Allegations of secrecy ==
The apparent secrecy surrounding the report written by the investigation panel from the Department of Civil Aviation attracted strong criticism. After the Minister, Mr Drakeford, announced to the House of Representatives that there was no need for a public inquiry into the disaster because he and his Department already knew the cause, he was attacked for presuming to know all the reasons when the Coroner's inquest was still in progress. An editorial in the Brisbane Courier-Mail claimed the Minister was trying to avoid public inquiries into aviation accidents. The Attorney-General's decision to withhold the Coroner's report also attracted strong criticism.

In the report of the Air Court of Inquiry into the 1948 crash of the DC-3 Lutana, Mr Justice William Simpson was strongly critical of the Department of Civil Aviation's air navigation policy. The Minister, Mr Drakeford, vigorously defended his Department against Justice Simpson's criticism. Justice Simpson was attacked in the Senate. An editorial in the Courier-Mail attacked the secrecy surrounding the Queensland Airlines accident and claimed that by not publishing his Department's report the Minister, Mr Drakeford, showed he had learned nothing from Justice Simpson's inquiry into the crash of the Lutana.

== Aircraft ==
External image
- Photograph of VH-BAG at Archerfield Airport in 1947

The aircraft was manufactured in 1942 as a model C-60 for the RAF and assigned constructor's serial number 2194. The RAF order was cancelled so it was delivered to the USAAF and assigned military serial number 42-32174. In September 1942 it arrived in Brisbane and saw military service with the USAAF and RAAF. In June 1945 it was withdrawn from service at Parafield Airport, South Australia. In February 1946 it was sold to a Brisbane company, Aircrafts [sic] Pty Ltd, and converted to civil configuration by installation of 8 passenger seats either side of a central aisle, and a seat at the rear for an air hostess. In November 1946 it was registered VH-BAG. In October 1948 Aircrafts Pty Ltd began trading under the name Queensland Airlines and used VH-BAG on regular airline services. It was the only Lockheed Lodestar in regular airline services in Australia.

== See also ==
- List of disasters in Australia by death toll
- List of accidents and incidents involving commercial aircraft
- List of accidents and incidents involving airliners by location

== Bibliography ==
- Job, Macarthur (1992). Air Crash Vol. 2, Chapter 7. Aerospace Publications Pty. Ltd. Fyshwick, Australia. pp. 200. ISBN 1-875671-01-3
