= George Pape =

Australian lawyer and judge

Sir George Augustus Pape (29 January 1903 – 15 June 1987) was an Australian lawyer and judge. He became a Queen's Counsel in 1955 and a judge in the Supreme Court of Victoria in 1957. He was knighted in 1968 and retired from the Supreme Court in 1975.

== Biography ==
Pape was educated at All Saints Grammar School, St Kilda; (Note: All Saints Grammar School was established in 1871 by All Saints Anglican Church, corner of Dandenong Road and Chapel St, East St Kilda. It ceased to operate as a secondary school in 1928, and as a primary school in 1937.) and the University of Melbourne. From 1940 to 1946 he served in the Royal Australian Air Force and was discharged with the rank of Squadron Leader.

=== Legal cases ===
Pape participated in four inquiries into major aircraft accidents in Australia:

- In the inquiry into the 1946 Australian National Airways DC-3 crash, Pape juniored to Dr E.G. Coppel KC who represented Australian National Airways, the aircraft operator.
- In the inquiry into the 1948 Australian National Airways DC-3 crash, Pape represented Australian National Airways, the aircraft operator.
- In the inquiry into the 1949 MacRobertson Miller Aviation DC-3 crash, Pape represented MacRobertson Miller Aviation, the aircraft operator.
- In the inquiry into the 1950 Australian National Airways Douglas DC-4 crash, Pape represented Australian National Airways, the aircraft operator.

In 1952 the state of Victoria challenged the power of the Commonwealth of Australia to impose uniform taxation law. The state government retained four counsel – Henry Winneke, (Note: At the time, Winneke was Solicitor-General of Victoria.) Garfield Barwick, Douglas Menzies and George Pape.

In the aftermath of the Petrov Affair in 1954, Prime Minister Robert Menzies established the Royal Commission on espionage. Pape was one of two counsel retained to assist the Chief Counsel for the Commonwealth. (Note: Chief Counsel for the Commonwealth was Victor Windeyer, QC. His junior counsel were Pape and Mr B.B. Riley of Sydney.)

== See also ==
- List of Judges of the Supreme Court of Victoria

== Bibliography ==
- Job, Macarthur (1992). Air Crash Vol. 2. Aerospace Publications Pty. Ltd. Fyshwick, Australia. pp. 200. ISBN 1-875671-01-3
