= 1950 Australian National Airways Douglas DC-4 crash =

Accident in Western Australia

Douglas DC-4 Amana crash
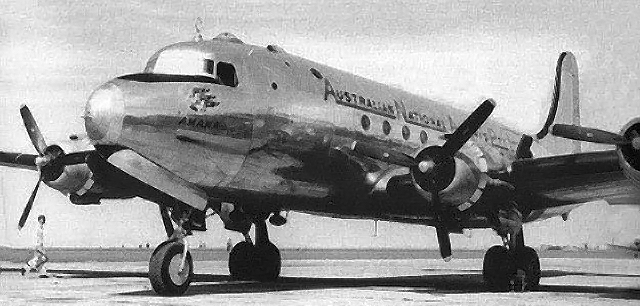
- The Douglas DC-4 Amana, the aircraft destroyed in the accident.

Accident
- Date: 26 June 1950
- Summary: Multiple engine failure
- Site: 19 km north-west of York, Western Australia; 31.821°S 116.581°E

Aircraft
- Aircraft type: Douglas DC-4
- Aircraft name: Amana
- Operator: Australian National Airways
- Registration: VH-ANA
- Flight origin: Perth Airport
- Destination: Adelaide Airport
- Occupants: 29
- Passengers: 24
- Crew: 5
- Fatalities: 29
- Survivors: 0

On 26 June 1950, a Douglas DC-4 Skymaster (Note: Although the DC-4 model was not named by its manufacturer, it is often referred to as the Skymaster, a name given to it by the United States armed forces.) aircraft departed from Perth, Western Australia, for an eight-hour flight to Adelaide, South Australia. It crashed 22 minutes after take-off, 35 miles (56 km) east of Perth Airport. All 29 occupants were killed in the accident; one initially survived but died five days later. As of 2025, it remains tied with the 1960 crash of Trans Australia Airlines Flight 538 as the worst aviation accident in Australia's peacetime history, at 29 fatalities each. By death toll, they are only beaten by the 40-fatality Bakers Creek air crash which occurred during World War II.

As the aircraft flew eastwards over the outer suburbs of Perth numerous witnesses observed that it was flying at a lower altitude than usual for the daily Skymaster services, and at least one of the engines was running roughly and backfiring at regular intervals. In the minutes before it crashed, witnesses heard a variety of engine noises – sometimes operating normally, sometimes all engine noise ceased, only to be replaced by what was described as a very loud, high-pitched "scream". When the wrecked engines were examined many weeks after the accident a significant amount of corrosion product was found in the fuel system within two of the engines. After a preliminary investigation, Investigators from the Department of Civil Aviation believed the water responsible for the corrosion was also responsible for rough running of at least one engine, and ultimately temporary loss of power from all engines on at least one occasion. The investigators did not find a likely source for the water.

All but one of the 29 occupants on board the aircraft died at the scene, either from multiple injuries and burns, or from incineration. One elderly male passenger initially survived the crash. The first rescuers at the crash site found him wandering about, dazed and distressed. He suffered serious burns and was admitted to hospital where he died five days later.

The accident became the subject of an Inquiry chaired by a Supreme Court judge. In the absence of evidence indicating the source of any water in the fuel, the Inquiry dismissed the submission that water was responsible for the accident. The Inquiry did not determine the cause of the accident but it made recommendations to enhance the safety of aircraft operations.

== The flight ==
The aircraft was the Amana, (Note: Australian National Airways made a practice of naming its aircraft with names ending in ana.) a Douglas DC-4-1009 registered VH-ANA and the flagship of the Australian National Airways fleet. It flew for the first time on 28 January 1946 and was flown to Australia on 9 February 1946.

The Amana departed from Perth Airport (Note: In 1950, the airport was commonly known as Guildford aerodrome.) at 9:55 pm for the 8-hour flight to Adelaide. On board were 24 passengers, 3 pilots and two air hostesses. (Note: The Amana was equipped with 44 passenger seats. On the fatal flight only 22 of these seats were occupied. The passenger load consisted of 22 adult passengers and 2 infants.)

A radio report was received from the Amana at 10:00 pm advising it was on course and climbing to 9,000 feet. Nothing more was heard from the aircraft. As it flew east over the outer suburbs of Perth numerous people on the ground observed that it was flying unusually low, and heard at least one of its engines running roughly and backfiring repeatedly. (Note: Accident investigators received reports of rough running and backfiring heard by witnesses Mr J Goodchild of Bellevue, Mrs N Ley and Mrs M Smith of Greenmount, Mr P Johns of Boya and Mr P Bunney of Darlington. Witnesses further east – Flight Sergeant Batchelor in Glen Forrest and Mrs Arkell in Mundaring reported that the aircraft was flying unusually low but they reported nothing unusual about the engine noise.) Amana crashed at about 10:13 pm.

== Crash ==
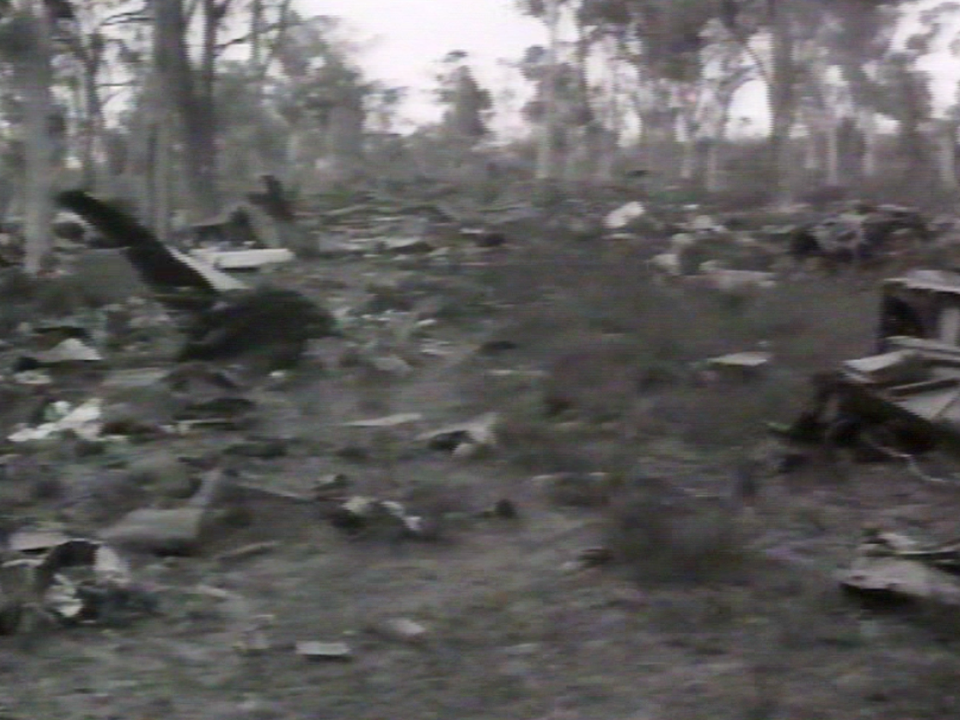
The debris field

External image
- "Photographs of Tragic Skymaster Crash"

External image
- "More Pictures Of WA's Worst Air Disaster"

Residents on farming properties to the west of York heard a large aircraft flying low over the area. The aircraft seemed to be in trouble because the noise from the engines was changing significantly. At times the engines seemed to be operating normally but on at least one occasion all engine noise ceased for a brief time and then returned as a very loud, high-pitched noise. One resident reported that when all engine noise ceased he could hear a rushing sound until the scream from the engines returned. Several residents reported seeing a bright flash of white light in the distance, followed by a loud crashing and scraping noise. Those closest to the crash could then see the yellow glow of a major fire.

Ten minutes after the Amana set course for Adelaide, a Douglas DC-4 operated by Trans Australia Airlines took off from Perth, also heading for Adelaide. (Note: The TAA DC-4 was VH-TAD, the John McDouall Stuart. Under Australia's Two Airlines Policy the two major domestic airlines, ANA and TAA, operated similar aircraft on the same routes with matching departure times.) As the TAA aircraft set course for Adelaide, the captain, Douglas MacDonald, (Note: On 31 October 1954 Captain Douglas Keith MacDonald was killed in an aircraft accident at Mangalore Airport in Victoria. He was the commander of a training flight in VH-TVA, TAA's first Vickers Viscount aircraft. The crew were attempting a take-off with one engine shut down. The Viscount crashed seconds after lifting off. MacDonald and two other captains were killed. Four other people on board survived.) saw a vivid white flash on the horizon in the direction in which he was heading. It lasted about six seconds, long enough for him to draw it to the attention of the two other crew members. Eight minutes later, the TAA aircraft passed over a band of fire on the ground. MacDonald estimated the fire was 28 nautical miles (52 km) east of Perth Airport. As MacDonald approached Cunderdin, he was aware the Amana, flying about ten minutes ahead of him, had not yet radioed its position report at Cunderdin. He became concerned that the vivid white flash and the ground fire might indicate some tragedy had befallen the Amana so he contacted Air Traffic Control. Air Traffic Control was also concerned about the Amana's failure to report at Cunderdin so on hearing MacDonald's observations of the vivid white flash and the ground fire they activated emergency procedures. They asked MacDonald to fly back to the fire and determine its position. MacDonald did so and advised Air Traffic Control of bearings from the fire to York and Northam, the towns nearest the crash site.

== Search and rescue ==
Frank McNamara (62), a beekeeper, and Geoff Inkpen (25), a young farmer, heard the sound of a big aircraft in serious trouble, flying low nearby. McNamara described the noise from the engines as "terrifying". They investigated and saw the bright light of a flash fire. (Note: Frank McNamara and his two teenage sons were living in a cottage near the homestead of the Inkpen family property, Berry Brow.) McNamara sent his two teenage sons in his utility truck to York to alert the police. McNamara and Inkpen then set out on foot in the direction of the fire. As there was bright moonlight, they were able to hurry through the bush. After about half an hour, they came upon a scene of devastation. They were astonished to find an elderly man in a dazed state wandering around the burning wreckage. He gave his name and explained that he had been a passenger on a large aircraft. He had initially survived the crash despite being badly burned, but died five days later from his injuries. Everyone else died at the scene of the crash.

In response to notification from Air Traffic Control, three ambulances from Perth were despatched in the direction of the crash site, known to be somewhere between Chidlow and York. The crash site was several miles from the road so the ambulance crews travelled eastwards all the way to York without sighting a fire. The crews were eventually guided back along the main road and then along a dirt road that enabled them to drive to within three or four miles of the crash site. The crews then took their first-aid boxes and set out on foot.

Frank McNamara made a bed of leaves for the initial survivor and built a fire to help keep him as warm and comfortable as possible. McNamara stayed with the initial survivor while Inkpen went to summon help. After several hours, ambulance crews arrived and administered first-aid and morphia. Rescue workers constructed a stretcher using saplings, bandages and overcoats. They covered the initial survivor with an overcoat and carried him for two hours to cover about two miles through thickly wooded country to McNamara's utility truck, which then carried him and his rescuers to a waiting ambulance.

Frank McNamara and Geoff Inkpen were publicly thanked by the Minister for Civil Aviation for the great assistance they rendered to the rescue effort throughout the night. In a public letter to Frank McNamara, the minister acknowledged the unrelenting effort of McNamara and his sons under extremely difficult conditions. He also acknowledged McNamara's care of the survivor and regretted that McNamara was not rewarded by seeing the survivor recover. In a public letter to Geoff Inkpen, the Minister expressed his deep appreciation for Inkpen's actions on the night of the crash. During World War II, Inkpen had served in the Royal Australian Air Force (RAAF) as a navigator and the minister acknowledged that, in peacetime, Inkpen had continued to uphold "the fine traditions" of the RAAF.

== Fate of those on board ==
Initially, one passenger survived the crash. He was identified as the 67-year-old managing director of Forwood Down, a South Australian engineering company. He was the oldest person on board the flight, and probably the most experienced air traveller. He was interviewed by police in hospital in Perth, but was not aware of much detail about the final minutes of the flight. He said there was no sign of fire prior to the crash and no announcement to passengers to fasten their seat belts. He died five days after the crash and was buried at the North Road cemetery in Adelaide, his home town.

Investigators believed the aircraft captain survived for a short time after the crash. His body was a short distance away from his seat and both were a few metres ahead of the wreckage where they had been thrown after the nose of the aircraft was split open in the impact with a large tree. The seat belt had not broken, but it had been undone. The captain's tunic was pulled up over his head as though to protect his face from the heat of the nearby inferno. Investigators believed he initially survived the crash and undid his seat belt to drag himself away from the fire. His body was not burnt, but the autopsy showed both his legs were broken and he died from a fractured skull.

Postmortem examinations were performed on the victims of the crash. The two co-pilots died from multiple injuries. Twenty-four passengers and the two flight attendants were found to have died from multiple injuries and burns, or incineration. Only 13 of the 29 victims could be formally identified. The remaining 16 victims were either unrecognisable or unable to be identified and were buried in a mass grave at Perth's Karrakatta cemetery.

== Passengers ==
On its fatal flight the Amana was carrying 24 passengers, including 2 infants. Of them, 23 died in the initial crash or the ensuing fire, while the 24th died five days later from his injuries.

Among the passengers of the flight were Charles Murray, the bishop of the Anglican Diocese of Riverina, and Norman Blow, the dean of the Christ Church Cathedral in Newcastle.

One passenger, Stan Baker, had narrowly avoided taking the flight of the Southern Cloud that crashed on 21 March 1931, and had a lifelong fear of flying.

== Investigation ==
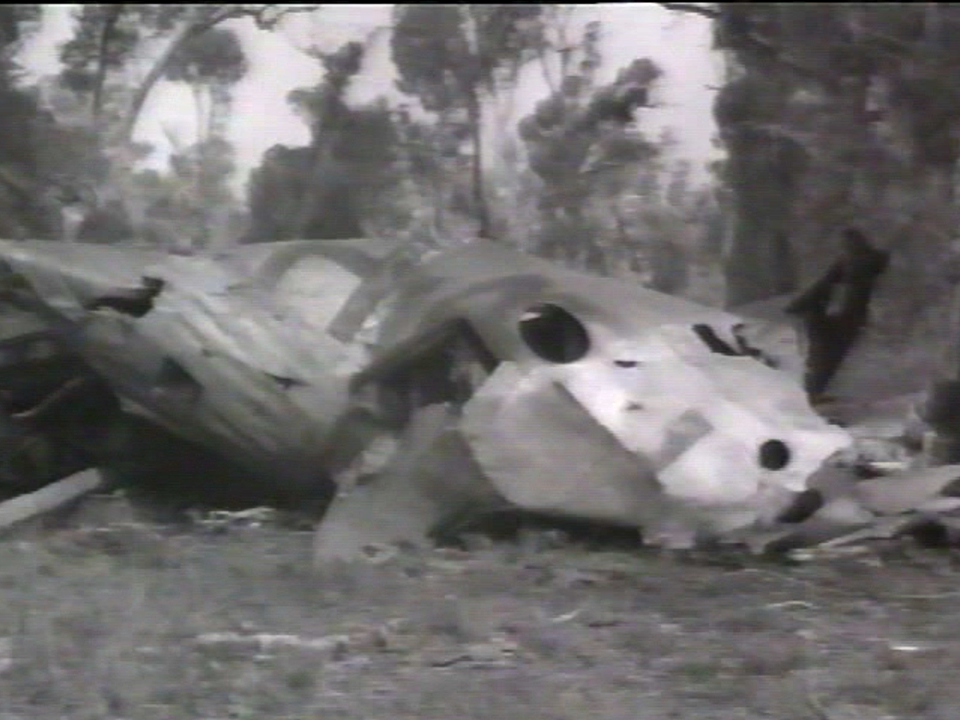
Part of the Amana's fuselage

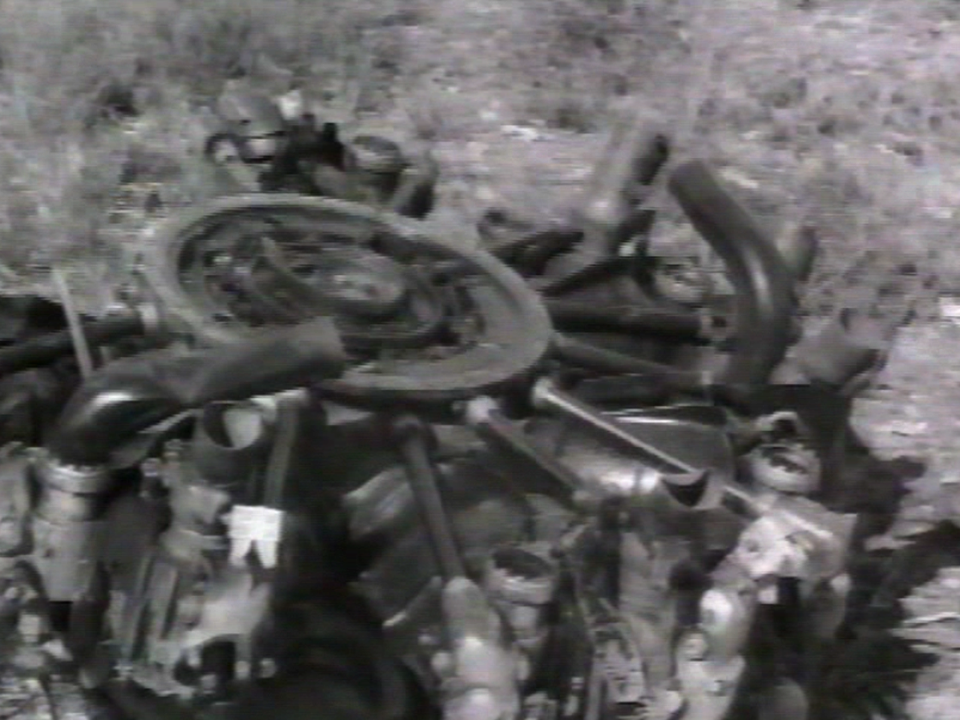
One of the Amana's engines

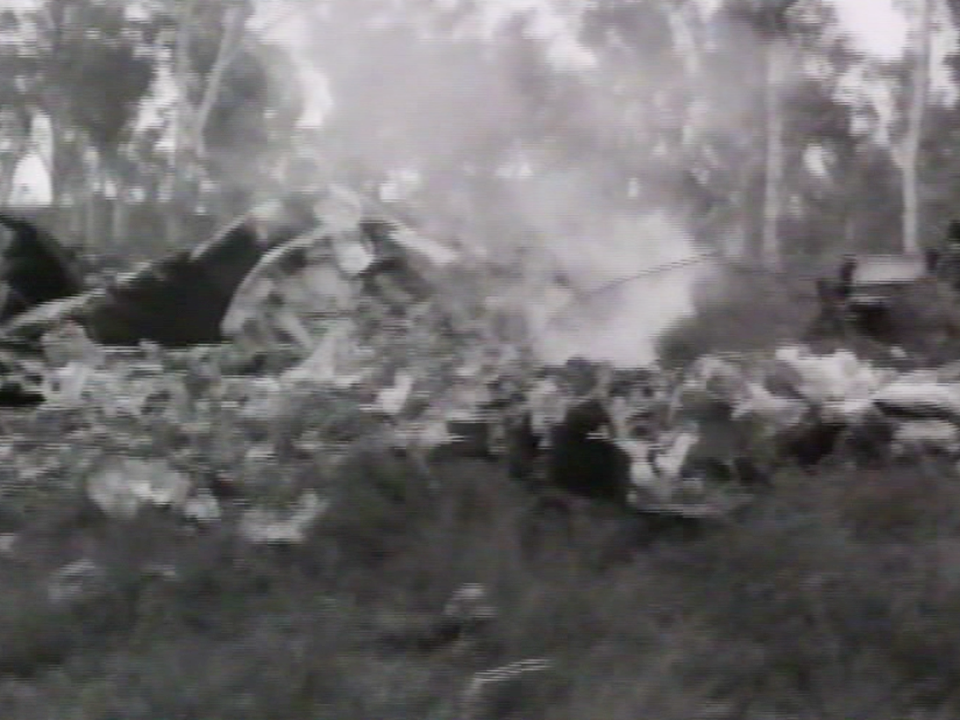
The wreckage burned for several hours

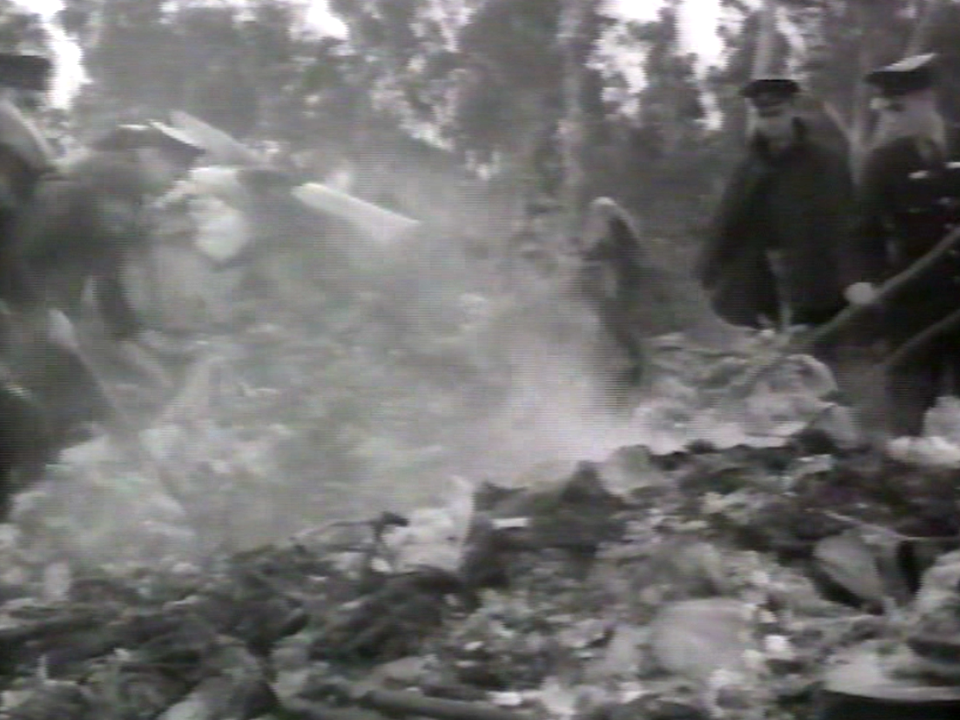
Western Australian police examining the still-burning wreckage

Three investigators from the Department of Civil Aviation began work at the crash scene the day after the accident. They found the Amana had crashed in a heavily timbered area on the Inkpen family property Berry Brow, on the easterly track between Perth airport and Kalgoorlie, at a point where the elevation was about 1,100 feet (340 m) above sea level. The aircraft struck the tops of tall gum trees while descending at an angle of about 15°. Its speed at impact was estimated at 250 miles per hour (400 km/h). It crashed through large trees, breaking them off, before impacting the ground violently and gouging a long, wide furrow. The left wing was torn away from the fuselage and then the aircraft broke up and burst into flames. Only the rear fuselage with the fin and rudder were not affected by fire. The wreckage trail was about 280 yards (260 m) long and 35 yards (32 m) wide. At the time of impact the Amana's left wing was lower than its right, suggesting it may have been turning left. It was heading north, not east towards Cunderdin. Investigators speculated that the crew may have been turning with the intention of returning to Perth airport; or they may have been preparing for a crash-landing in a large clear area to the north of the crash site.

Possibly as a result of rough-running of one or more of its engines, the Amana was observed flying over Perth's outer-eastern suburbs at an unusually low altitude. No witness report was received from anyone along the next 16 nautical miles (30 km) of the Amana's track from Perth's outer suburbs to within 5 nautical miles (9 km) of the crash site. In the minute before it crashed, eight witnesses (Note: Frank McNamara and Geoff Inkpen, Mr G Ackland, Mrs M Reimers, Mr R Quarmby and his daughter Judith, Mr J Stratton and Mr D Hill.) heard a large aeroplane in distress and reported unusual engine noise, including engine noise ceasing on at least one occasion, followed by the sudden return of loud engine noise. This suggested that, on at least one occasion, none of the engines were producing power, followed by a resumption of power on some of the engines. The investigation team concluded that the Amana failed to reach its assigned altitude of 9,000 feet, and that it experienced intermittent engine problems of such severity that all engine power was lost on at least one occasion. Without power and with only one of its propellers feathered, a Douglas DC-4 loses altitude at a great rate, possibly as fast as 100 feet per second (6,000 feet per minute).

Engines and propellers numbers 1 to 3 suffered substantial damage in the crash, but engine and propeller number 4 suffered much less damage. The investigators determined that at the time of impact, propellers 1, 2 and 3 were turning normally and their engines were producing power but propeller number 4 was feathered and its engine was not operating. There was also some evidence that action was taken by the crew to unfeather propeller number 4 in the moments before impact. (Note: The configuration of the distributor valve assembly led investigators to conclude that unfeathering action had been taken by the crew immediately prior to impact.) None of the engines contained evidence of any internal failure prior to impact. All the magnetos were tested and the results indicated normal ignition was available to all engines up to the time of impact.

Engine number 4 suffered only minor, external damage. It was dismantled by the investigation team in an attempt to determine why it might have been shut down by the crew. A corrosion product was found in the passages of the fuel flow meter on engine number 4. Western Australia's Deputy Mineralogist identified it as magnesium hydroxide. (Note: The magnesium hydroxide was identified by Western Australia's Deputy Mineralogist, George Le Mesurier.) This is formed by reaction of magnesium and water, suggesting the fuel passages had been filled with water in the months between the crash and the detailed examination of the engine. Charles Gibbs, an engine specialist employed by the Department of Civil Aviation, estimated at least 45 cubic centimetres of water must have been involved. Rain falling on the crash site before engine number 4 was removed could not account for this much water in the fuel passages. Gibbs first examined the fuel system of engine number 4 and discovered the corrosion about two months after the accident. He conducted a test on an identical flow meter and found that after he left water in the fuel flow passages for approximately 8 weeks a similar amount of corrosion product developed. This suggested the rough running heard by witnesses on the ground may have been caused by water in the fuel reaching engine number 4. The steel rotor in the fuel pump of engine number 1 was slightly corroded but the fuel systems of engines 2 and 3 showed no evidence of corrosion. Investigators formed the opinion that the rough running heard by witnesses on the ground, and the crew's decision to shut down engine number 4 and feather its propeller, may have been related to water in the fuel reaching that engine. The intermittent loss of power on all engines in the final minutes of the flight may indicate that all engines were receiving fuel contaminated with water.

The only abnormality found in all four engines was the vapour vent float in the fuel strainer chamber of the carburettors. The floats had been crushed by extreme fuel pressure. Inquiries were made to the engine manufacturer and other civil aviation authorities but none had prior experience of vapour vent floats collapsing. Tests on carburettors were also carried out in Australia by the Aeronautical Research Laboratories but without finding any suitable explanation. Whether the floats were crushed in flight or in the crash could not be determined, but even if it had occurred in flight it would not have affected operation of the engines.

The earliest reports from the crash site speculated that the Amana was already on fire when it struck the tops of trees because those trees, and pieces of the aircraft's left wing torn off in the impact with them, showed signs of scorching. Several eyewitnesses reported seeing flames in the sky before the aircraft struck the ground. Department of Civil Aviation investigators discounted this speculation because only one of the Amana's push-button engine fire extinguishers had activated and this had most likely occurred during the crash or the fire.

Australian National Airways (ANA) ground staff in Sydney checked the Amana's fuel tanks for the presence of water prior to its first departure on 26 June. They found none. The Amana was subsequently re-fuelled in Melbourne and Adelaide but no check of the fuel tanks was made on these occasions. After being re-fuelled in Perth immediately prior to the fatal flight, the fuel filters in all 4 engines and the fuel drain serving the cross-feed pipe in the wing centre-section were all checked for the presence of water. The fuel tanks themselves were not checked, partly because, on the night of 26 June, the ground staff were "pressed for time" because one despatch engineer was absent due to illness.

ANA was of the opinion that if a small amount of water entered a fuel tank during refuelling it would only reach the drain cocks when the aircraft was in level flight so it could not be detected immediately after re-fuelling. For 15 years ANA had operated in the knowledge that the only satisfactory time to check fuel tanks for the presence of water was prior to the first flight of the day, after the aircraft had been stationary overnight. Throughout this time ANA checked fuel tanks for the presence of water prior to the first flight of the day.

Prior to its final flight, the Amana received 1,756 US gallons (6,650 L) of fuel from a tanker operated by the Vacuum Oil Company. (Note: After refuelling, total fuel on board was 2,400 US gallons (9,100 L).) The tanker had been checked for the presence of water in the morning and again at 6:30 pm, about 2 hours prior to refuelling the Amana. It had also supplied fuel to 3 de Havilland Dove aircraft, none of which suffered any engine problems or were found to have water in the fuel.

The Department of Civil Aviation performed tests on parts of the DC-4 fuel system. Tests on the engine fuel system showed that when the engine boost pump was operating, a vortex formed in the engine fuel tank. If a small amount of water was present, this vortex held the water in suspension and prevented it from entering the engine. The tests also showed that when the boost pump was turned off, the vortex dissipated and any water would soon find its way into the engine. Investigators believed this might explain why all engines were operating normally during the takeoff but at least one engine began to run roughly around the time the engine boost pumps would be turned off.

== Inquiry ==
The Minister for Civil Aviation, Thomas White, appointed Justice William Simpson of the ACT Supreme Court to conduct an Air Court of Inquiry into the crash of the Amana. (Note: Initially it was announced that Justice Albert Wolff of the Supreme Court of Western Australian would preside over the Inquiry. A year earlier, Wolff had presided over an Inquiry into the 1949 MacRobertson Miller Aviation DC-3 crash at Perth airport. However, prolonged illness prevented Justice Wolff from commencing the Amana Inquiry and eventually the Minister appointed Justice Simpson to preside.) The Inquiry opened in Perth on 7 February 1951. Justice Simpson was assisted by two assessors – Captain J.W. Bennett, a pilot with British Commonwealth Pacific Airlines; and Mr D.B. Hudson, an aeronautical engineer with Qantas Empire Airways. The Commonwealth Crown Solicitor was represented by L.D. Seaton and B. Simpson. Australian National Airways was represented by George Pape. (Note: George Augustus Pape, later Sir George, became a Justice in the Supreme Court of Victoria in 1957 and served until 1975.) The Department of Civil Aviation was represented by Henry Winneke. (Note: Sir Henry Arthur Winneke was knighted in 1957 and later became Chief Justice of the Supreme Court of Victoria (1964) and Governor of Victoria (1974.)) The Air Pilots' Association was represented by Francis Burt. (Note: Sir Francis Burt was made a Justice of the Supreme Court of Western Australia in 1969 and Chief Justice in 1977. He was Governor of Western Australia from 1990 to 1993.) The Inquiry sat in Perth for 12 days; heard evidence from 67 witnesses and concluded on Tuesday 20 February.

Western Australia's Deputy Mineralogist gave evidence that he had identified magnesium hydroxide, a corrosion product, in fuel passages in one of Amana's engines. Counsel for the Department of Civil Aviation explained that evidence gathered during investigation of the crash indicated water in some of the fuel on board Amana was responsible for the corrosion products found in engines numbers 1 and 4; for the rough running of an engine heard by a number of witnesses; and for the intermittent failure of all engines, leading to the aircraft descending to ground level. The Inquiry heard evidence from the Department of Civil Aviation's Acting Chief Inspector of Air Accidents, C.A.J. Lum, a former RAAF Douglas Dakota pilot, who described his personal experience of a flight in 1946 in which all fuel tanks were checked for the presence of water prior to take-off and the flight proceeded normally for 20 minutes until both engines began running roughly. Lum returned to the aerodrome and checked again for water in the tanks, this time finding a significant amount of water. Counsel for the Vacuum Oil Co. explained that it was almost impossible for water to be introduced to an aircraft during refuelling, and vigorously rejected the theory that water in the fuel contributed to the crash.

Counsel for the Commonwealth Crown Solicitor presented evidence that the Amana was on fire before it first struck trees. Counsel for the widow of one of the victims suggested the crash may have been caused by the elevator trim tab jamming in the diving position.

In April 1951 Justice Simpson advised the Minister for Civil Aviation that new evidence had become available. The Minister gave permission for the Inquiry to be re-opened. The Inquiry re-opened in Melbourne on 4 June 1951. The Department of Civil Aviation had recently completed tests on the DC-4 fuel system. The tests showed that when an engine boost pump was operating, a vortex in the engine fuel tank prevented water from entering the engine. The tests also showed that when the boost pump was turned off, any water would soon find its way into the engine. The Department of Civil Aviation believed this might explain why all engines were operating normally during the takeoff but at least one engine began to run roughly around the time the engine boost pumps would be turned off. However, Justice Simpson stated that the re-opened Inquiry served only to confirm his view that the Amana's loss of power was not due to water in the fuel.

Justice Simpson's report was tabled in the House of Representatives on 28 June 1951 by the new Minister for Civil Aviation, Larry Anthony. (Note: Larry Anthony replaced Thomas White as Minister for Civil Aviation at the swearing-in of the Fifth Menzies Ministry on 11 May 1951.) The Inquiry found that the Amana suffered total loss of engine power on at least one occasion, followed by rapid loss of height until it struck the ground. However, the evidence did not allow the court to determine the cause of the total loss of engine power. Consequently, the court was unable to determine the cause of the accident. Simpson stated he was satisfied water had not been introduced into the Amana's fuel system in Sydney, Melbourne, Adelaide or Perth.

The Inquiry uncovered two deviations from the Air Navigation Regulations although it did not consider these deviations contributed to the accident:

1. ANA was not in the practice of performing a fuel-drain check immediately after each re-fuelling, as required by Air Navigation Orders.
2. On the fatal flight, 8,545 feet of photographic film were carried as cargo. Air Navigation Orders specified that a maximum of 3,000 feet of photographic film may be carried.

The Inquiry also uncovered three irregularities in the safety regulation of civil aviation in Australia although none of these irregularities contributed to the accident. Justice Simpson's report contained recommendations to deal with the irregularities:

1. fuel companies that supply fuel to aircraft should be required to check every compartment in a tanker wagon for the presence of water each time fuel in the tanker wagon is replenished.
2. when fuel was being drained from an aircraft's tanks to check for the presence of impurities, the sample should be collected in a transparent vessel to allow more reliable identification of any water that might be present.
3. when pilots who regularly fly four-engine aeroplanes perform 6-monthly checks for renewal of their commercial pilot licences, the check should be carried out in a four-engine aeroplane rather than in a two-engine aeroplane as was the common practice.

During the House of Representatives debate on the report, the Minister, Larry Anthony, stated that he had already asked fuel companies to check their tanker wagons for the presence of water after each replenishment, and the relevant Air Navigation Order would be amended to require fuel to be drained into transparent containers. He stated that his department did not intend to amend the relevant Air Navigation Order to require pilots of four-engine aeroplanes to perform the periodic checks in a four-engine aeroplane because it considered it was more challenging to fly with one engine inoperative in a two-engine aeroplane than in a four-engine aeroplane.

== Subsequent speculation about cause of the crash ==
Investigators from the Department of Civil Aviation believed water in some of the fuel tanks of VH-ANA was responsible for rough running of one or more of the engines; and this ultimately led to intermittent failure of all the engines. The Inquiry led by Mr Justice Simpson found no evidence that there was significant water in the fuel tanks. No radio call was received from Amana to indicate the nature of any problem, or even that the crew was aware of a problem. The Inquiry concluded without determining the cause of the crash.

In the weeks and months after conclusion of the Inquiry one possible explanation of the crash began to circulate among employees of ANA. This possibility began with one piece of evidence uncovered by the Inquiry during cross-examination of ANA's ground staff. It was reported that after sunrise the morning after the crash the one-gallon container used to check Amana's fuel filters was found empty and lying on its side on the apron a short distance from where Amana had been parked. The Inquiry attached no significance to this evidence and did not explore it further.

Employees of ANA believed the container had last been used to drain fuel from the cross-feed drain cock, the fuel cock that serves the pipe in the wing centre-section for cross-feeding of fuel from tanks in one wing to engines in the other wing. Moments after this procedure commenced, the staff member was advised of a telephone call from his wife and he went to answer the telephone. With the cross-feed selector valves closed, little fuel ran out when the drain cock was opened. Some employees believed that because no fuel was running out neither the staff member nor anyone else noticed the drain cock was still open. Due either to the wind or the slipstream from Amana's propellers as it began to taxi prior to take-off, the almost-empty container was blown over and rolled some distance along the apron where it was found the next morning.

Some employees of ANA speculated that approximately ten minutes after take-off the crew of Amana were aware of the seriousness of rough running on number 4 engine so decided to shut it down. (Note: Rough-running could have been due to water in the fuel or to ignition problems. ANA was experiencing trouble with some types of spark plug used on the Pratt & Whitney R2000 engine. Engine number 4 was still equipped with earlier, more troublesome plugs.) Company procedures specified that if an operational problem occurred prior to reaching Kalgoorlie, 290 nautical miles (540 km) east of Perth, the aircraft was to return to Perth; but if a problem occurred after reaching Kalgoorlie the flight could continue to Adelaide. The Douglas DC-4 was capable of flying from Perth to Adelaide with one engine inoperative. The crew of Amana on the fatal flight might have decided to wait until past Kalgoorlie before making a radio call to report one engine had been shut down, and then continue to Adelaide. To manage fuel usage and balance the weight of fuel across the wing, the crew might have selected some of the operating engines to draw fuel from number 4 tank. The DC-4 had a complex fuel selection system and, either deliberately or inadvertently, all operating engines might have been connected to number 4 tank. If the drain cock in the cross-feed pipe was still open to the atmosphere, air would be drawn into the pipe, causing an interruption of fuel supply to the engines, all engines to stop operating and their propellers to move to fine pitch. When the crew realised engines 1, 2 and 3 had all suddenly failed and that cross-feeding of fuel was the source of the problem they would have changed the fuel selections and restored fuel to the engines, causing the sudden screaming noise heard by witnesses as the engines burst back into life with their propellers in fine pitch. Amana had been flying at lower altitude than usual so there was inadequate height for the crew to arrest the high rate of descent before the aircraft struck high ground on the Inkpen family property. (At the Air Court of Inquiry, George Pape, representing ANA, described as "fantastic" any suggestion that the crew of the Amana would be cross-feeding fuel from one wing to the engines on the other wing at such an early stage of the flight.)

The Flight Superintendent and the Technical Superintendent of ANA simulated some of these events during a test flight in another DC-4. (Note: The Flight Superintendent of ANA was Captain P.T.L. Taylor; and the Technical Superintendent was Mr D.S. Stewart.) They were satisfied that the time intervals between events were compatible with the likely sequence of events leading to the crash of the Amana, and that it was a plausible explanation of the accident. However, on legal advice this possible explanation of the crash was not made public. Two accidents involving Douglas DC-4s, one approaching Dublin Airport, Ireland, in 1961 and another approaching Stockport Airport, Manchester, United Kingdom, in 1967 were attributed to interruption of fuel supply when engines were supplied from the cross-feed system which was open to an empty fuel tank, allowing air to be drawn into the cross-feed pipe.

== Recent archaeological finds and re-evaluation of Amana's final moments ==
Around 2002 further wreckage from Amana's port wing outboard of the engines was investigated about 1.5 miles from the crash site. This wreckage had not been located during the 1951 investigation, although it had subsequently been located during farming operations and shifted to a barren area where it avoided significant subsequent degradation by grass fires. It suggests that having attained substantially level flight, Amana hit one or more trees several seconds before reaching its final impact site, causing sufficient damage to result in the in-flight fire observed by witnesses at the time, and a deviation from its original flight path. Part of this wreckage is now on display at The Civil Aviation Historical Society & Airways Museum at Essendon Airport.

A high-speed impact on part of the wing and fuel system might explain a surge in fuel pressure sufficient to cause the crushed vapour vent float found in the carburettor of each of Amana’s engines.

== Memorials ==
After the accident, scavengers proved to be such a problem that the owners of Berry Brow kept all gates locked. Geoff Inkpen stated that after completion of an Inquiry a bulldozer would be used to dig a ditch at the crash site and what remained of the Amana would be buried.

A small memorial to the loss of the Amana, its passengers and crew, has been created in the aeronautical museum in the town of Beverley, 29 miles (47 km) south-east of the crash site. The memorial includes the starboard undercarriage from the Amana. A memorial plaque was erected in the main street of Beverley on 26 June 2001, the fifty-first anniversary of the crash.

== Aftermath ==
Australian National Airways (ANA) never fully recovered from the crash of the Amana. Since the beginning of 1945, 79 people had been killed in accidents in aircraft operated by ANA. (Note: From the beginning of 1945 until 27 June 1950, fatalities in aircraft operated by Australian National Airways were: 1945 Australian National Airways Stinson crash – 10 fatalities; 1946 Australian National Airways DC-3 crash – 25 fatalities; 1948 Australian National Airways DC-3 crash – 13 fatalities; 8 November 1948 crash of the Douglas DC-3 Kurana on Mount Macedon, Victoria – 2 fatalities; ANA Skymaster Amana crash – 29 fatalities.) In late 1948, ANA suffered 4 crashes in 4 months. (Note: The four crashes were the DC-3 Lutana (2 September 13 fatalities), DC-3 Kanana (4 October, no fatalities), DC-3 Kurana (8 November, 2 fatalities) and DC-3 Kyilla (29 December, no fatality).) The loss of ANA's reputation as a safe airline, together with the unblemished safety record and growing commercial success of its rival Trans Australia Airlines, sent ANA into decline. (Note: TAA was accident-free from its commencement in October 1946 until 8 August 1951 when Douglas DC-3 VH-TAT carrying cargo crashed after take-off from Cambridge Aerodrome, killing both pilots.) In 1957 ANA was taken over by Ansett Transport Industries Limited and merged with Ansett Airways to form the domestic airline Ansett-ANA.

== See also ==
- List of disasters in Australia by death toll
- List of accidents and incidents involving commercial aircraft in 1950
- List of accidents and incidents involving airliners in Australia
