= William Simpson (Australian judge) =

Australian soldier, Army officer, and judge

Mr Justice William Simpson

Justice, Supreme Court of the Australian Capital Territory
- In office 24 October 1945 – 30 April 1960

Personal details
- Born: 12 June 1894 Balmain, New South Wales
- Died: 24 November 1966 (aged 72) Marrickville, New South Wales
- Spouse: Dorothy Blackley
- Children: Two sons
- Education: Sydney University
- Occupation: Barrister

William Ballantyne Simpson (12 June 1894 – 24 November 1966) was an Australian soldier, barrister, Army officer, administrator and Supreme Court judge.

== Early life ==
Simpson was born in Balmain, a suburb of Sydney, New South Wales. He was educated at Fort Street Boys' High School. His father was a barrister and William enrolled in Law at Sydney University.

In December 1916 Simpson deferred his Law studies and enlisted in the Australian Imperial Force. In January 1918 he was sent to the Western Front where he served as a driver. (Note: Simpson served with the 11th Field Company, Engineers.) He returned to Australia in April 1919 and was discharged from the A.I.F.

== Civilian life ==
Simpson resumed his Law studies at Sydney University in 1919. He graduated with the degree of Bachelor of Laws and was admitted to the Bar in 1920. In his practice as a barrister he specialised in legal actions related to motor-vehicle accidents.

Simpson was a member of the Nationalist Party of Australia and in the period 1922 – 1925 he nominated for three elections – both State and Federal – but without success.

In 1925 he married Dorothy Margaret Peel Blackley with whom he had two sons.

== Second Australian Imperial Force ==
External image
- Photograph of William Simpson taken in 1942.

In 1922 Simpson joined the Militia as a legal officer. In 1941 he was attached to the Second Australian Imperial Force with the rank of temporary Brigadier. He was sent to the Middle East where he served as deputy judge advocate-general of the 2nd A.I.F. He returned to Australia in June 1942 and was appointed deputy judge advocate-general at Land Headquarters in Melbourne.

== National security ==
In September 1942 Simpson was appointed Director-General of Security in Australia. The director-general of security was Head of the Commonwealth Security Service and was based in Canberra. In this role Simpson reported to the Attorney-General, Herbert Evatt, who was his contemporary at Fort Street Boys’ High School and Sydney University.

The Commonwealth Security Service investigated organisations and individuals considered likely to be subversive or actively opposed to the nation's interests. It investigated espionage and sabotage. It vetted defence-force personnel and workers in defence-related industries. It controlled the issue of passports and visas. It was responsible for the security of airports and wharves, and factories engaged in manufacture of munitions and other items necessary for Australia's war effort. It was responsible for radio security. Simpson was also responsible for identification of enemy aliens, and for their internment and release.

In November 1944 Simpson was discharged from the Army and continued as a civilian in his role as director-general of security. In June 1945 he produced a report warning of the danger of the Communist Party of Australia.

== Supreme Court ==
In October 1945 Simpson resigned as director-general of security and was appointed the sole judge of the Supreme Court of the Australian Capital Territory. Concurrent with his role as Supreme Court judge, Simpson was also the judge advocate-general of the Australian Army and the Royal Australian Air Force.

Justice Simpson gave advice on the findings of war crimes tribunals in Australia.

In 1947-48 Justice Simpson chaired an inquiry into the cost of producing wheat in Australia.

== Air accidents ==
Justice Simpson chaired Air Courts of Inquiry into three major aviation accidents in Australia:

- 1946 Australian National Airways DC-3 crash – In March 1946 a Douglas DC-3 crashed immediately after take-off from Hobart, killing all 25 people on board. It was Australia's worst civil aviation accident.
- 1948 Australian National Airways DC-3 crash – In September 1948 a Douglas DC-3 named Lutana crashed en route from Brisbane to Sydney, killing all 13 people on board. Justice Simpson's report was critical of Australia's out-dated air navigation systems. As a result, he was subjected to strong criticism from members of the Government.
- 1950 Australian National Airways Douglas DC-4 crash – In June 1950 a Douglas DC-4 Skymaster named Amana crashed 22 minutes after take-off from Perth, killing all 29 people on board. (Note: One passenger survived the crash of the Amana but died in hospital six days later.) It was Australia's worst civil aviation accident. (Note: Australia's most deadly civil aviation accidents were the Amana in 1950 and Trans Australia Airlines Flight 538 in 1960. Both caused the death of all 29 people on board. Flight 538 was a Fokker F27 Friendship which crashed into the sea at night while preparing to land at Mackay, Queensland.)

== Shipping accident ==
In November 1947 Justice Simpson chaired the Commonwealth Court of Marine Inquiry into the stranding of the 9,786-ton motor vessel Reynella on a reef. On 18 August 1947, while sailing from Lae, Papua New Guinea to Sydney, the Reynella became stranded on a reef in the Jomard Passage in the Louisiade Archipelago. There was no injury or loss of life, and the Reynella was refloated on 12 September 1947.

Justice Simpson found the Reynella’s Captain was careless in his navigation and ordered his certificate of competency to be suspended for six months.

== Later life ==
Mr Justice Simpson retired from the Supreme Court in April 1960 suffering from Parkinson's disease. He died in Marrickville, a Sydney suburb, in November 1966.

== See also ==
- List of Judges of the Supreme Court of the Australian Capital Territory

== Bibliography ==
- Job, Macarthur (1992). Air Crash Vol. 2. Aerospace Publications Pty. Ltd. Fyshwick, Australia. pp. 200. ISBN 1-875671-01-3
