= 1949 MacRobertson Miller Aviation DC-3 crash =

Accident in Western Australia

MMA DC-3 crash
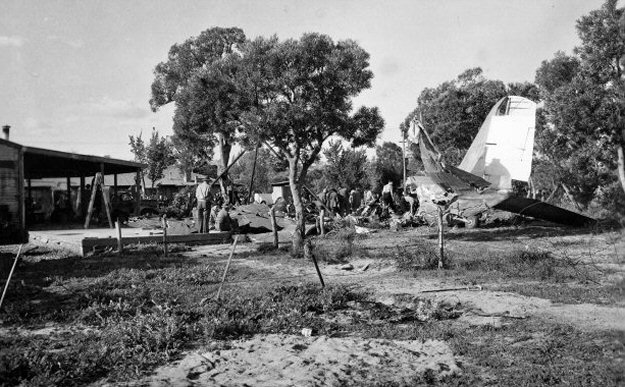
- crash site

Accident
- Date: 2 July 1949
- Summary: Loss of control after takeoff
- Site: Perth, Western Australia; 31.9216°S 115.9710°E

Aircraft
- Aircraft type: Douglas DC-3
- Registration: VH-MME
- Flight origin: Perth Airport
- Destination: Carnarvon Airport
- Occupants: 18
- Passengers: 14
- Crew: 4
- Fatalities: 18
- Survivors: 0

External image
- Newspaper cover page

External images
- Photograph 1 of crash site.
- Photograph 2 of crash site.
- Newspaper photographs of crash site.

On 2 July 1949 a Douglas DC-3 aircraft departed from Perth Airport for a night flight of 817 kilometres (507 mi) to Carnarvon. The aircraft climbed to a height of about 150 metres (500 ft) and then spiralled almost vertically to the ground, killing all 18 people on board. It crashed about 1.6 kilometres (1 mi) north of Perth Airport and burned for over one hour. At the time, it was the worst civil aviation accident in Western Australia. (Note: In July 1949 Australia's worst civil aviation accident was the 1946 Australian National Airways DC-3 crash in Hobart that killed all 25 occupants. The second-worst was a Lockheed 18 Lodestar that crashed at Coolangatta in March 1949, killing all 21 occupants. Third-worst was shared by two that caused the death of all 18 occupants – the 1938 Kyeema crash east of Melbourne, and the Fitzroy at Perth airport. The crash of the Fitzroy remained the worst in Western Australia until June 1950 when the DC-4 Amana crashed near York, killing all 29 occupants.)

== The flight ==
The aircraft was the airliner Fitzroy, registered VH-MME and operated by MacRobertson Miller Aviation. (Note: MacRobertson Miller Aviation merged with Airlines (WA) in late 1955 and was re-named MacRobertson Miller Airlines. MacRobertson Miller named its aircraft after West Australian rivers.) On 2 July 1949 it was about to conduct the regular passenger service from Perth to Darwin which departed about 2 am to allow passengers to connect with the twice-weekly Sydney to London flight operated by Qantas. The first stop was to be Carnarvon. (Note: The Perth to Darwin service made intermediate stops at Carnarvon, Port Hedland, Derby and Wyndham.) On board were three pilots, an air hostess and 14 passengers. (Note: The Douglas DC-3 is operated by two pilots. On this flight there were two pilots and a supernumerary pilot in the cockpit. The supernumerary, Captain Eric Charles Langford, was travelling as far as Derby to take command of another flight.) The aircraft took off at 2:14 am in driving rain. Visibility was about 16 kilometres (10 mi). The aircraft climbed unusually quickly after it left the runway. It was observed to climb to a height of about 150 metres (500 ft) and then roll and spiral vertically to the ground.

The aircraft crashed in a clear area between huts at the South Guildford housing camp, a former Army camp where 70 huts were being used to house civilians. (Note: Formerly Guildford Army Camp. Some sources named the housing camp as Camp No. 22.) As a result of the aircraft diving vertically to the ground, the wreckage was mostly confined within an area that was no larger than 18 by 18 metres (60 ft × 60 ft). (Note: One source stated the clear area was 30 by 30 metres (100 ft × 100 ft). Other sources stated the wreckage of the Fitzroy was mostly concentrated in an area 18 by 18 metres (20 yd × 20 yd).) The aircraft narrowly missed the surrounding huts with wreckage coming to within 4 metres (12 ft) of one hut, and within 5 paces of the front verandah of another. One propeller was found about 64 metres (210 ft) from the wreckage.

An intense fire erupted inside the fuselage. The first fire-fighting equipment to reach the site was the fire tender from the airport, crewed by one fireman only. The fireman (Note: Fireman Arthur David James Firth said that at least 3 fire tenders would have been necessary to extinguish the fire.) laid a foam blanket around the burning wreckage and sprayed foam on the fire. He used all the foam without extinguishing the flames. Two other fire tenders from neighbouring areas arrived to assist. It was 90 minutes before the fire was extinguished.

After sunrise, police, firemen and undertakers worked for an hour to remove the bodies of the 18 people killed in the accident. All the bodies were burned beyond recognition. Several of the bodies were still sitting in an upright position. The bodies of the three pilots in the cockpit were half-buried under a mass of charred newspaper. The aircraft was carrying the Perth daily newspaper to towns in the north-west of the state. Police and two officers from the Department of Civil Aviation sifted through the wreckage in the rain, searching for items to help identify the victims and for clues as to the likely cause of the tragedy. (Note: The officers from the Department of Civil Aviation's western region were Robert Walter Ridley and R. K. Pritchard.)

== Investigation ==
The Department of Civil Aviation immediately appointed a panel of two to investigate the accident. (Note: The panel consisted of Chief Inspector James Herbert Harper and Accident Investigator James Edward Schofield.) Examination of the wreckage showed that the flaps and undercarriage were retracted and both engines had been producing high power at the time of the crash. All trim tabs were in typical positions for takeoff and all control cable runs were intact. Nothing was found in the wreckage to indicate any prior defect or failure that might have caused the aircraft to crash or the pilot to lose control. The setting of the automatic pilot could not be determined due to destruction of the forward fuselage. The investigation initially focussed on possible failure to remove one of the flight control chocks, defective flight instruments, misuse of the wing flaps, structural failure of the tailplane, defective elevator control system, misuse of the automatic pilot, and incorrect loading.

Control chocks for the left aileron, one elevator and the rudder were found correctly stowed in the remains of the aircraft's rear fuselage compartment. Searchers were unable to find the chock for the other elevator or the right aileron, either at the crash site or on the ground between the runway and the crash site. On the morning after the accident an MMA apprentice found the missing elevator chock on the tarmac close to where VH-MME was positioned for an engine test run the previous afternoon. The investigators carried out a flight test on a DC-3 to determine what effect, if any, was caused by installing an aileron chock on the elevator. They found there was no effect and the presence of the chock did not prevent the pilot having full control of the elevator.

Staff of the Department of Civil Aviation calculated the most likely position of the centre of gravity on the fatal flight and found it was about 3.3% of Mean Aerodynamic Chord behind the rear limit. (Note: The position of passengers and cargo was not known precisely. The position of the centre of gravity was most likely to have been between 2.0% and 4.7% of MAC behind the rear limit.) They carried out some flight tests in a DC-3 with its centre of gravity 4.7% of MAC behind the rear limit and found there was a loss of longitudinal static stability that made it difficult to trim the aircraft for a constant airspeed but the low-speed flight handling qualities had not deteriorated seriously. They concluded that the incorrect position of the centre of gravity did not adequately explain the accident and there must have been some other cause, possibly highly unusual. The investigation ended without determining the cause.

== Inquest ==
In August 1949 the City Coroner, Pat Rodriguez, conducted an inquest into the deaths of the 18 people on board the aircraft.

A dispatch officer with MacRobertson Miller Aviation (Note: The dispatch officer was Vivian James Dandridge. Another source described him as a ground engineer.) observed the aircraft take off normally, then climb to an almost vertical position, roll over and dive vertically towards the ground, twisting as it did so. Written evidence from the aerodrome control officer (Note: The aerodrome control officer was Ronald David Dyson. Another source named him as Raymond David Dyson.) on duty in the control tower stated that he observed the aircraft turn through 180 degrees as though in a spiral turn or spin.

Some witnesses who lived at the South Guildford housing camp believed one of the aircraft's engines had failed by the time of the crash. The City Coroner was satisfied both engines were operating normally during the takeoff and up until the time of the impact.

A medical officer (Note: Alan T. Pearson, district medical officer) conducted post-mortem examinations of the bodies. He confirmed there was no indication of alcohol in the bodies of any of the pilots. All on board died of multiple injuries before being burned.

A resident of the housing camp who was one of the first witnesses to arrive at the crash scene told the City Coroner she saw the air hostess in the cockpit, standing beside the pilot. (Note: The witness was Gwendoline Gilbert. Her statement that she saw the air hostess standing in the cockpit beside the pilot was at odds with other evidence, including evidence from post-mortem examinations of the bodies.)

The City Coroner was satisfied that the aircraft was airworthy and neither MacRobertson Miller Aviation nor the pilot did anything negligent to cause the fatal crash.

== Inquiry ==
On 28 September 1949 the Minister for Civil Aviation, Arthur Drakeford, announced that a court of inquiry would be held to investigate the accident because the investigation by the Department of Civil Aviation had been unable to determine the exact cause. Justice Wolff (Note: Albert Wolff was appointed Chief Justice of Western Australia in February 1959. He was knighted in June 1959.) of the Supreme Court of Western Australia was appointed to chair the inquiry. The inquiry commenced on 12 December 1949.

=== Observations ===
The inquiry received evidence from the aerodrome control officer on duty in the control tower at the time of the takeoff. (Note: The aerodrome control officer was Raymond David Dyson. Another source named him as Ronald David Dyson.) He observed the aircraft climb at a steeper rate than any airline-operated aircraft he had seen previously. When the aircraft was at a height of about 150 metres (500 ft) the left wing dropped sharply, as if in a stall. The nose dipped and the aircraft seemed to rotate through 180 degrees before dropping vertically. A ground engineer (Note: The ground engineer was Vivian James Dandridge who tested the engines prior to the fatal flight and found them to be operating normally. Another source described him as a dispatch officer.) also saw the aircraft climb abruptly before it nosed over and twisted twice as it dived to the ground.

=== Aircraft loading ===
The inquiry heard that on 27 June 1949 the Department of Civil Aviation sent a letter to MacRobertson Miller Aviation advising that the methods used by its operational personnel to check the weight and balance of company aircraft did not conform to the appropriate requirements, and that approved methods must be used in the future. In response, the Operations Manager for MacRobertson Miller Aviation sent specific instructions to pilots on 30 June. On 1 July, the day before the accident, the Operations Manager discussed his instructions with the pilots of the accident flight. (Note: The Operations Manager was Kenneth Cohen.) Staff involved with the loading of aircraft were instructed to use the method of Index Units to check that the centre of gravity of an aircraft was within limits. The employee who loaded the freight and passengers' luggage on the accident flight told the inquiry that after the freight was loaded, a check of the aircraft weight and balance showed that about 36 kilograms (80 lb) of freight should be removed. Freight weighing 46 kilograms (102 lb) was then removed. However, this employee believed the Load Sheet column labelled Index Units was not completed. (Note: Colin Oliver Mason, senior despatch officer for MMA, gave evidence regarding the weighing of passengers and their luggage but said he did not believe it was his responsibility to complete the Load Sheet column labelled Index Units. The employees who loaded the freight and passengers' luggage were Robert Woods and Ronald Butler.)

There were suggestions the aircraft had been incorrectly loaded with 640 kilograms (1,400 lb) in the rear baggage locker when it was assumed only 500 kilograms (1,100 lb) would be carried there. The accuracy of statements regarding 640 kilograms (1,400 lb) was challenged.

=== Control chocks ===
The inquiry heard that the first officer had been unable to find all the control chocks normally used to lock the control surfaces on the aircraft while it was parked. There were concerns that one of the aircraft's control chocks might have been left in position instead of being removed before takeoff. The inquiry heard that all chocks were eventually accounted for. There was also a concern that one of the aileron chocks might have been inadvertently inserted in the elevator circuit. Chief Inspector James Harper told the inquiry that he made some test flights in a DC-3 aircraft in a similar configuration to the Fitzroy on the accident flight. One test showed that the DC-3 could be flown satisfactorily even with an aileron chock in the elevator circuit. Harper was satisfied the aircraft did not take off with the elevator locked.

=== Pilot competency ===
The pilot in command of the aircraft on the accident flight was Captain William Norman. (Note: Captain of the aircraft was William Graham Norman, unmarried, aged 27 years. He served in the RAAF until joining MMA in July 1947.) Captain Cyril Kleinig, an approved checking pilot with MacRobertson Miller Aviation, gave evidence to the inquiry. He had flown with Captain Norman on many occasions and described him as competent. (Note: The approved checking pilot was Cyril Nathaniel Kleinig, Assistant managing director of MMA.) A pilot who had flown the Fitzroy to Carnarvon and return the day before the accident told the inquiry the aircraft had behaved normally. He also said he had flown with Captain Norman many times and found him to be careful and competent, and more meticulous than most in performing his cockpit drills. (Note: The witness who had flown the Fitzroy the day before the accident was Arthur Edward Budd. Budd had flown as First Officer with Captain Norman on many occasions.)

=== Air hostess ===
Two residents of the housing camp who were among the first to arrive at the crash scene told the inquiry they could see two bodies in the wreckage of the cockpit – a male and a female, both wearing uniform, so they presumed the bodies were those of the pilot and air hostess. One described the female as having fairly long blonde hair. (Note: The witnesses were George Robert Forbes and Harry John Jones. Their evidence regarding the air hostess in the cockpit was at odds with other evidence presented at the inquiry, including evidence from post-mortem examinations of the bodies.) The superintendent of air navigation and safety in the western region of the Department of Civil Aviation (Note: Mr Eorl Huntley Fry.) said the bodies of the pilot and first officer were found in their correct seats in the cockpit. Particular attention was paid to the body found closest to the rear of the cabin, a few feet (a metre) forward of the hostess's seat. The body was that of a female. Another witness was an employee of MacRobertson Miller Aviation who raced from the airport to the scene of the crash. (Note: The witness was Colin Oliver Mason, senior despatch officer for MMA.) He contradicted the evidence that the body of a woman could be seen in the cockpit. He told the inquiry the air hostess had red hair.

=== Irregularities ===
The inquiry exposed certain irregularities in MacRobertson Miller Aviation's operations. These irregularities centred on the loading of aircraft, proper completion of Load Sheets, and administrative methods.

=== Counsels' summaries ===
The Department of Civil Aviation was represented by Henry Winneke. (Note: Sir Henry Arthur Winneke was knighted in 1957 and later became Chief Justice of the Supreme Court of Victoria (1964) and Governor of Victoria (1974.)) Mr Winneke suggested to the inquiry that the immediate cause of the accident was that the pilot lost flying control of the aircraft. He said the reason for this loss of control was unknown although incorrect loading of the aircraft may have contributed. He acknowledged the excellent work done by the Department's accident investigators in attempting to determine the cause. George Pape, (Note: George Augustus Pape, later Sir George, became a Justice in the Supreme Court of Victoria in 1957 and served until 1975.) counsel representing MacRobertson Miller Aviation, warned against speculating on what might have caused the crash and urged the court to make an explicit finding that loading of the aircraft was not a possible factor contributing to the cause of the crash.

The inquiry sat for seven days and adjourned on Wednesday 21 December 1949.

=== Report and findings ===
The report and findings of the inquiry were not released until 8 March 1950 when the new Minister for Civil Aviation, (Note: The Australian labour government, in which Arthur Drakeford was Minister for Civil Aviation, was defeated at the federal election on 10 December 1949. A coalition government of conservative parties was formed with former AFC pilot and RAAF officer Thomas White as the Minister for Civil Aviation. See Fourth Menzies Ministry.) Thomas White, tabled them in the House of Representatives. The report confirmed that the crash occurred because the aircraft stalled and the pilots were unable to regain control. However, the evidence was not sufficient to allow determination of what caused the stall. The report conceded that over-loading of the aircraft's rear baggage compartment may have contributed to the stall.

The inquiry acknowledged that the operator, MacRobertson Miller Aviation, had distributed instructions about aircraft loading to its pilots on 30 June but considered more should have been done. On the night of the accident the pilot in command had not checked the loading calculations performed by the two men responsible for loading the aircraft, as he was required to do, although the inquiry acknowledged there was insufficient evidence to conclude that the pilot in command was responsible for the accident. The inquiry considered the man responsible for loading the rear baggage compartment possessed inadequate knowledge of aircraft loading and had been untruthful. (Note: Ronald Frederick Butler) He had invented his story to hide his over-loading of the compartment.

The inquiry was critical of the operator and the Department of Civil Aviation. In particular, it was critical of the operator's poor standards of maintenance of aircraft instruments. For this reason, the inquiry recommended the operator's airline licence should be suspended or cancelled. It also considered the Department should have made more checks of the operator's methods and record keeping. The Minister declined to take action against the operator, saying its maintenance record keeping had improved significantly since the accident. He also cited the hardship that would be inflicted on many remote communities in Western Australia if the operator's airline licence were to be suspended or cancelled. The Minister said his Department would be extra vigilant towards the operator but conceded there were limits to what could be done without significant increases in staff numbers.

The inquiry was also critical of the lack of qualifications and experience of the pilot in command, the late Captain Norman. It said Norman should not have been promoted to captain, and evidence from Captain Kleinig in support of Captain Norman was worthless. It recommended that promotion of a pilot to Captain of an airliner should be at the discretion of the Department of Civil Aviation, and that the Department should take account of all records and reports of tests relating to the applicant.

The Managing-Director of MacRobertson Miller Aviation, Mr E.C. Gare, rejected claims of incorrect loading on the night of the accident. He also defended Captain Norman, saying he had 3,500 hours flying experience and an unblemished record.

== Aircraft ==
The aircraft was constructed as a Douglas C-47A-20-DL transport aircraft with a Douglas serial number 9350. It was completed in April 1943 and assigned the military serial number 42-23488. It was delivered to the United States Army Air Forces in Brisbane in May 1943.

In July 1946, it was acquired by MacRobertson Miller Aviation and ferried from the Philippines to Perth, where it was converted from a military C-47 to a civil DC-3 with seating for 21 passengers. It was registered by MacRobertson Miller Aviation in March 1947 (Note: The aircraft was registered VH-AXM in March 1947. ICAO subsequently prohibited use of registrations beginning AX so the aircraft was re-registered VH-BXM in November 1948. It was re-registered VH-MME in December 1948.) and named Fitzroy.

== See also ==
- 1946 Australian National Airways DC-3 crash – Accident in Hobart
- 1948 Australian National Airways DC-3 crash – Accident in New South Wales
- List of disasters in Australia by death toll
- List of accidents and incidents involving commercial aircraft
- List of accidents and incidents involving airliners by location
