= Trans Australia Airlines Flight 538 =

1960 aviation accident in Australia

Trans-Australia Airlines Flight 538
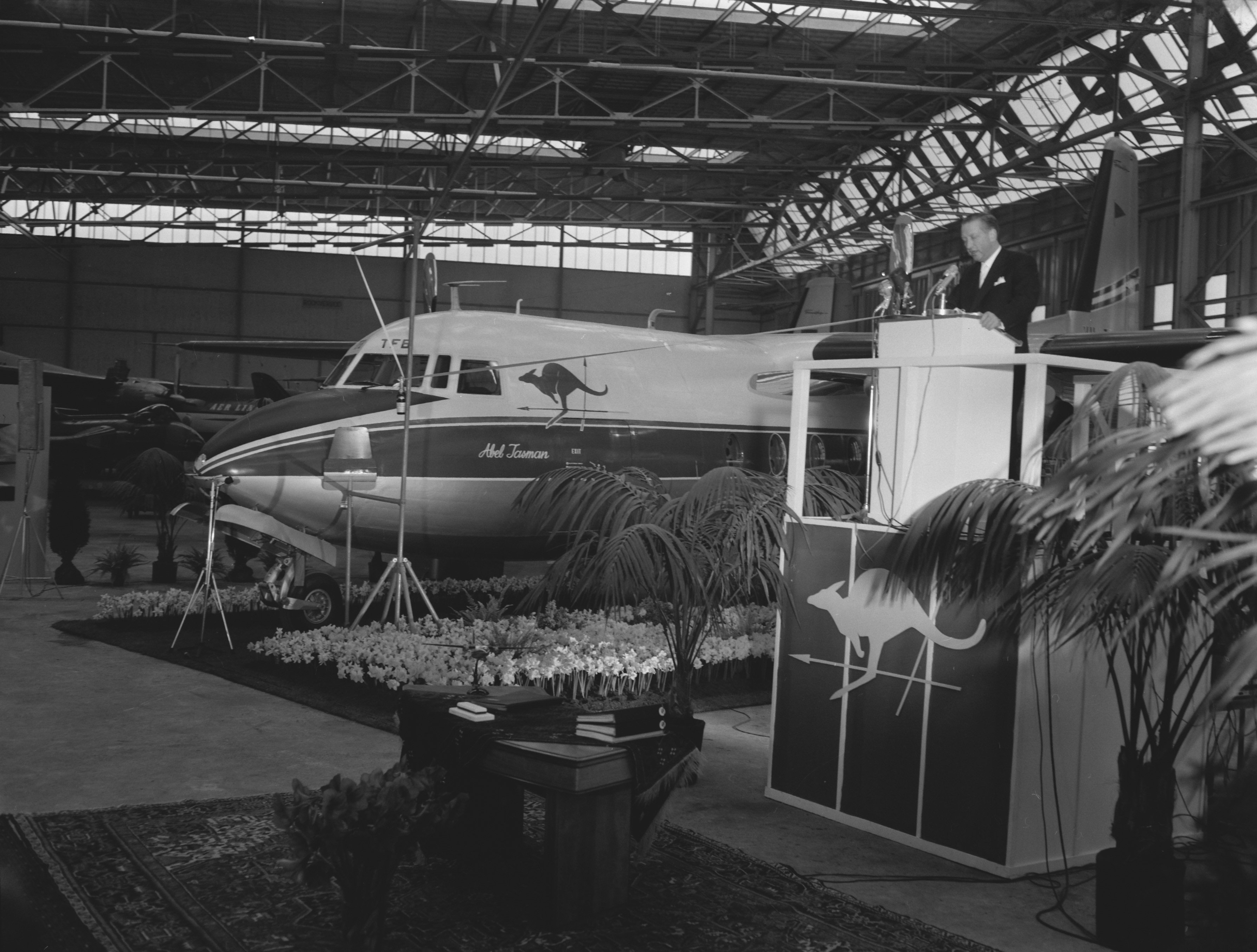
- VH-FTB, the aircraft involved in the accident, seen in 1959 with a previous livery

Accident
- Date: 10 June 1960
- Summary: Controlled flight into terrain for undetermined reasons
- Site: Mackay, Queensland, Australia

Aircraft
- Aircraft type: Fokker F-27 Friendship 100
- Aircraft name: Abel Tasman
- Operator: Trans Australia Airlines
- Registration: VH-TFB
- Flight origin: Brisbane Airport; Brisbane, Queensland
- 1st stopover: Maryborough Airport; Maryborough, Queensland
- 2nd stopover: Rockhampton Airport; Rockhampton, Queensland
- Destination: Mackay Airport; Mackay, Queensland
- Occupants: 29
- Passengers: 25
- Crew: 4
- Fatalities: 29
- Survivors: 0

On 10 June 1960, a Fokker Friendship passenger aircraft operated by Trans Australia Airlines (TAA) was on approach at night to land at Mackay, Queensland, Australia when it crashed into the sea. All 29 people on board were killed.

== Aircraft ==
The aircraft was TAA's first Fokker Friendship F-27 aircraft; TAA was the first airline outside of Europe to order the type. TAA's director of engineering, John L. Watkins OBE, accepted the aircraft, registered VH-TFB, at the Fokker works near Schiphol Airport, Amsterdam, on 6 April 1959. The aircraft was christened Abel Tasman after the Dutch explorer who was the first European to reach New Zealand, Tasmania, and parts of mainland Australia in 1642–1644; the acceptance ceremony was attended by the Australian ambassador and his wife, Sir Edwin and Lady McCarthy. The aircraft delivery flight to Australia was captained by Don Winch.

In the 14 years since the creation of TAA in 1946, it had experienced only two fatal accidents – a Douglas DC-3 carrying cargo crashed after take-off from Cambridge Aerodrome on 8 August 1951, killing both pilots; and a Vickers Viscount crashed on a training flight at Mangalore Airport on 31 October 1954, killing three pilots. By June 1960, TAA had 12 Fokker Friendships in service.

== Accident ==
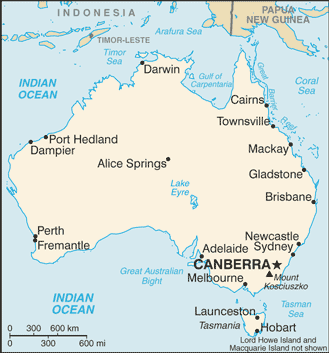
Location of Mackay (east coast, between Townsville and Gladstone) in relation to other major Australian cities.

On the late afternoon and evening of Friday, 10 June 1960, VH-TFB was flying TAA Flight 538 from Brisbane to Mackay, with stops at Maryborough and Rockhampton. It left Brisbane on time at 5 pm under the command of Captain F. C. Pollard with G. L. Davis as First Officer.

The flight to Maryborough and on to Rockhampton was normal. The aircraft arrived at Rockhampton Airport at 7:12 pm, where the crew received the weather forecast for Mackay, predicting shallow fog patches. VH-TFB was refuelled to 700 gallons, giving sufficient range to continue on to Townsville if fog made it impossible to land in Mackay.

Adding to the nine passengers already aboard, seven adults and nine schoolboys joined the flight at Rockhampton. All the schoolboys were boarders at Rockhampton Grammar School, returning home to Mackay for the Queen's Birthday long weekend.

VH-TFB departed from Rockhampton at 7:52 pm and ascended to 13,000 feet (4,000 m). At 8:17 pm, Mackay air traffic controller E. W. Miskell reported that fog had rolled in and temporarily closed Mackay Airport. A few minutes later, having come to the spot where he would start descending, Captain Pollard told the tower controller he would hold over Mackay at 13,000 feet (4,000 m) in case visibility improved. At 8:40 pm they reported they were over the airport. It was a bright moonlit night with a completely calm sea and two approaches were aborted due to a low layer of cloud on the coastline obscuring the sight of the strip on final approach.

By 10 pm, the fog was thinning. Air traffic controller Miskell reported this to VH-TFB, and Captain Pollard said they would begin an approach to the airport. Miskell reported the airport conditions. Pollard acknowledged the transmission.

Miskell then telephoned the airport fire service for the latest ground temperature. It was 55.4 degrees Fahrenheit (13 degrees Celsius.) Miskell immediately reported this to VH-TFB. This time, there was no acknowledgement. Miskell transmitted again, noting the time was 10:05 pm, and again there was no reply. At 10:10 pm, Miskell started the procedure for launching a search and rescue operation.

== Immediate aftermath ==
Five hours after the accident, at about 3 am on the morning of Saturday, 11 June 1960, a searchlight-equipped motor launch found items of wreckage, including damaged passenger seats, clothing and cabin furnishings, floating on the ocean between Round Top Island and Flat Top Island, five nautical miles due east of Mackay Airport.

A navy survey ship, HMAS Warrego, was sent to search for the sunken wreckage, and arrived on Sunday, 12 June 1960. At 4:20 pm that afternoon, Warrego discovered the major sections of VH-TFB in 40 feet (12 m) of water, a further 4 nautical miles (7.4 km) south-west of Round Top Island (or about 3 nautical miles (5.6 km) south-east of Mackay Airport). Salvaging the wreck took another two weeks.

== Investigation ==
A Board of Accident Inquiry was appointed on 29 July 1960; after allowing the investigators to sift the wreckage, it finally opened on 4 October 1960. The board sat for four days in Brisbane and two more in Mackay, before concluding on 10 November 1960. The Board was chaired by Mr Justice Spicer of the Commonwealth Industrial Court.

The inquiry did not determine a particular cause. The aircraft had flown into the ocean for no apparent reason, and so the board focussed on the altimeter. One possibility was that the static pressure system or altimeter was malfunctioning and not allowing display of the correct altitude.

Another possibility was that the reading of the three-pointer altimeter was misinterpreted. This type of altimeter has individual pointers for thousands, hundreds and tens of feet, and can be difficult to interpret. Errors of 1,000 or 10,000 feet were common, as had been outlined by W. F. Grether in a 1949 report for the Journal of Applied Psychology. As a consequence, three-pointer altimeters were later removed from service. If human error were the case, the accident may have simply been the result of a controlled flight into terrain. However, many commentators thought this unlikely, given the long experience of Captain Pollard.

Another possibility was posited by TAA's director of engineering, John L. Watkins OBE, who was intrigued by a mysterious brown glass medicine bottle discovered in the wreckage of the cockpit. Watkins theorised that one of the schoolchildren on the flight may have been an aviation enthusiast, and had been shown into the cockpit whilst handling a bottle of model aircraft fuel. At some point the bottle's contents may have spilled in the cockpit, the fumes distracting the pilots enough for them to make a mistake and crash.

Frank McMullen, TAA's Technical Services Engineering Superintendent and F27 Project Engineer, was a member of the team that joined with Department of Civil Aviation officials studying the crash. He formed the view that at the third attempt to land, the crew adopted a low flight path hoping to keep the airstrip in sight below the cloud layer, but were deceived by the difficulty in assessing height over a glassy sea and put the left wing tip into the water turning onto the runway approach.

One of the recommendations made by the Board of Accident Inquiry was that passenger-carrying aircraft of the size of the F-27 and larger should be equipped with flight data recorders.

== Long-term aftermath ==
Australia became the first country to mandate the carriage of cockpit voice recorders on civil transport aircraft, a trend which was later followed by other countries. Today, all large civil transport aircraft are required to carry a CVR.

Trans Australia Airlines Flight 538 and the 1950 Australian National Airways Douglas DC-4 crash, with 29 fatalities each, remain the two deadliest aviation accidents in Australian peacetime history. The greatest loss of life in an air accident in Australia was the Bakers Creek air crash in 1943 which caused 40 fatalities in a United States Army Air Forces Boeing B-17 Flying Fortress.

== See also ==
- List of disasters in Australia by death toll
