= 1946 Australian National Airways DC-3 crash =

Accident in Hobart

Seven-Mile Beach crash
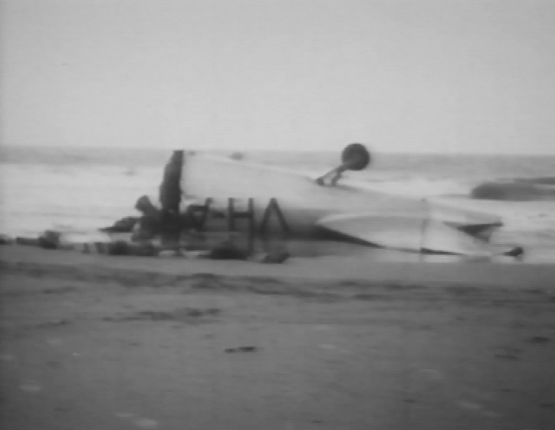
- Rear fuselage inverted on Seven-Mile Beach. The fin and rudder have been folded down parallel to the tailplane.

Accident
- Date: 10 March 1946
- Summary: Crash into sea
- Site: South of Cambridge Aerodrome, Hobart, Tasmania; 42°52′S 147°31′E

Aircraft
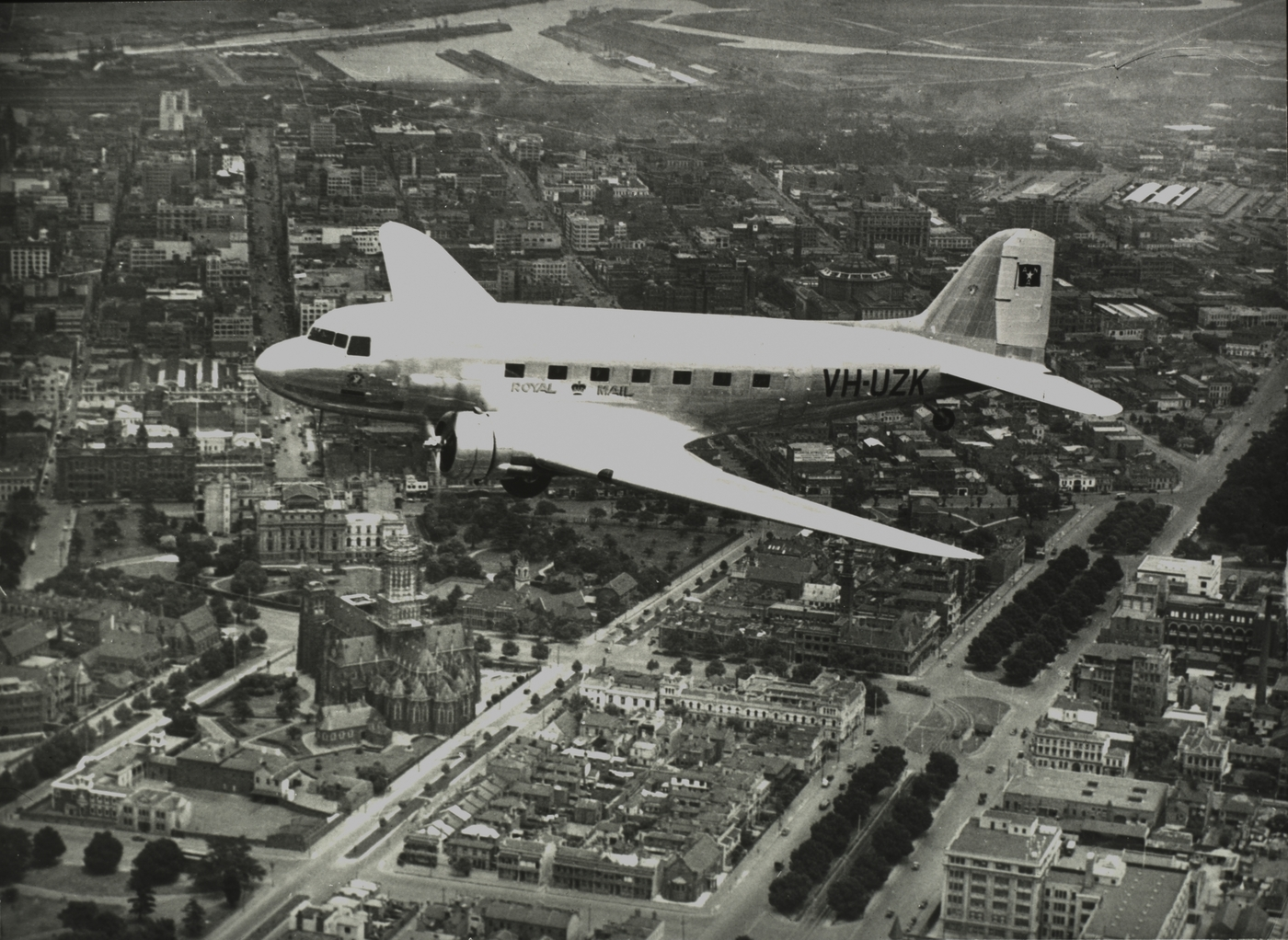
- Australian National Airlines Douglas DC-3, similar to the one involved
- Aircraft type: Douglas DC-3
- Registration: VH-AET
- Flight origin: Cambridge Aerodrome, Hobart, Tasmania, Australia
- Destination: Essendon Airport, Melbourne, Victoria, Australia
- Passengers: 21
- Crew: 4
- Fatalities: 25
- Survivors: 0

On Sunday 10 March 1946 a Douglas DC-3 aircraft departed from Hobart, Tasmania, for a flight to Melbourne, Australia. The aircraft crashed into the sea with both engines operating less than 2 minutes after takeoff. All twenty-five people on board the aircraft died. It was Australia's worst civil aviation accident at the time. (Note: It remained the worst until the crash of the Douglas DC-4 Amana in 1950. Prior to 10 March 1946 Australia's worst civil aviation accident was the Douglas DC-2 Kyeema which crashed near Melbourne on 25 October 1938 killing all 18 people on board.)

An investigation panel was promptly established to investigate the accident. The panel was unable to conclusively establish the cause but it decided the most likely cause was that the automatic pilot was inadvertently engaged shortly after takeoff while the gyroscope was caged. The Department of Civil Aviation took action to ensure that operation of the automatic pilot on-off control on Douglas DC-3 aircraft was made distinctive from operation of any other control in the cockpit, and that instructions were issued impressing on pilots that gyroscopes should be un-caged prior to takeoff.

An inquiry chaired by a Supreme Court judge closely examined three different theories but found there was insufficient evidence to determine any one of them as the cause. This inquiry discovered that the captain of the aircraft was diabetic and had kept it secret from both his employer and the Department of Civil Aviation. The judge considered the captain's diabetes and self-administration of insulin probably contributed significantly to the accident but he stopped short of making this his official conclusion.

In his report, the judge recommended modification of the lever actuating the automatic pilot. The inquiry uncovered four irregularities in the regulation of civil aviation in Australia and the judge made four recommendations to deal with these irregularities.

== The flight ==
The Australian National Airways aircraft registered VH-AET arrived at Cambridge aerodrome at 8:15 pm local time, about four hours late. The return flight to Essendon Airport was scheduled to depart at 4:50 pm, but did not do so until 8:50 pm.

On board were 21 passengers, 3 pilots and an air hostess. Douglas DC-3 (and C-47) aircraft were normally crewed by two pilots but on 10 March the cockpit of VH-AET was occupied by a third person, a supernumerary pilot who was making his first flights with the airline. (Note: The cockpit of VH-AET was not equipped with a jump seat or lap strap for a third occupant.) The weight of the aircraft was about 900 pounds (410 kg) below the maximum authorised weight. (Note: The Certificate of Airworthiness for VH-AET authorised a maximum weight of 25,900 lb (11 748 kg). An alternative source says VH-AET was 880 pounds (400 kg) below the maximum weight.) The takeoff was into a light southerly wind towards Frederick Henry Bay and the sea. Observers at the aerodrome reported that the takeoff was normal, and both engines were operating perfectly.

Witnesses in the vicinity of Seven-Mile Beach (Note: Seven-Mile Beach is the northern boundary of Frederick Henry Bay.) estimated that the aircraft reached a height of a little above 400 ft (120 m) before turning left slightly and descending steeply. The aircraft cleared the land and crashed into Frederick Henry Bay about 300 yards (270 m) (Note: Estimates of the distance from the shore to the wreckage vary between 200 yards (180 m) and 400 yards (370 m).) beyond the water's edge and a mile (1.6 km) from the western end of Seven-Mile Beach. After takeoff it flew for less than 2 minutes and covered a distance of only 2.9 nautical miles (5.4 kilometres). (Note: The position of the wreckage of VH-AET was approximately: 42.86°S 147.52°E)

== Recovery ==
=== Wreckage ===
External image
- Newspaper photograph of rear fuselage after it had been dragged ashore using a rope attached to the tailwheel

On learning of the crash at nearby Seven-Mile Beach employees of Australian National Airways raced from Cambridge aerodrome to lend assistance. About 11:15 pm the rear fuselage came to the surface a short distance off-shore. (Note: Newspapers published on 12 March stated the rear fuselage came to the surface only 45 minutes after the crash.) Donald Butler, (Note: Donald James Butler was a maintenance engineer employed at Cambridge aerodrome by Australian National Airways. Butler was able to confirm that Spence did not require any maintenance carried out on the aircraft. Prior to takeoff Butler observed Spence occupying the Captain's seat in the cockpit.) one of the employees, feared the air hostess might still be trapped in her seat in the rear of the fuselage. He took a length of rope, swam out to the floating piece of structure, attached the rope to the tailwheel and then swam back to the beach. A motor lorry was used to drag the rear fuselage ashore but there was no-one inside. The right tailplane, elevator and trim tab were almost undamaged. The elevator trim tab was still set appropriately for a shallow climb after take-off.

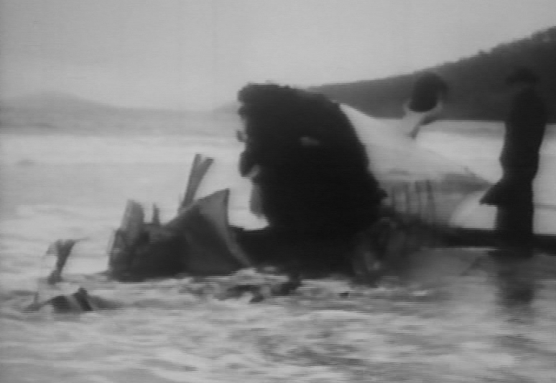
A closeup view of the rear section of the washed up plane

The wreckage was in about 18 ft (5.5 m) of water. (Note: Newspaper reports of the water depth vary between 15 ft and 18 ft.) A diving pontoon was towed to the site by Royal Australian Navy ship HMAS Huon. (Note: HMAS Huon was a 40 ft wooden naval launch.) Diver Glen Thorne (Note: Glen Armstrong Thorne was a diver employed by the Hobart Bridge Company.) found pieces of wreckage scattered over a wide area of the sea bed. The aircraft had disintegrated and there were few recognisable pieces of structure. Key parts of the wreckage were eventually recovered from the sea bed by Thorne working from the pontoon.

=== Bodies ===
About 4 hours after the crash the mutilated body of a woman was washed onto Seven-Mile Beach. Fifteen minutes later the body of a man was washed ashore. It was later identified as the body of the captain. At intervals until 6:30 am another 5 bodies were washed ashore. The next day, another 3 bodies were recovered. The bodies were badly mutilated and either naked or clad only in vestiges of underclothing, indicating the severity of the impact with the water. One body was missing a leg. A head, severed from its body, was recovered in the vicinity.

The bodies of 21 of the 25 people on board were eventually recovered from the beaches around Frederick Henry Bay. The remaining 4 bodies were never found. (Note: The four bodies never found were those of the co-pilot (David John Collum), two male passengers and a female passenger. Some newspaper reports spelled the co-pilot's surname as Colburn.) One body was found on the beach at Sandford, about 5 miles from the site of the crash. The body of the supernumerary pilot was not identified until 19 days after the accident.

Two years after the accident, a human thigh-bone was found on Seven-Mile Beach. Police believed the bone came from one of the bodies never recovered.

== Investigation ==
The director-general of Civil Aviation promptly established a panel to investigate the accident. (Note: The Director-General of Civil Aviation was Daniel McVey. In May 1946 McVey resigned as Director-General and Captain Edgar Charles Johnston began acting as Director-General. The investigation panel consisted of A. Affleck, H. Duke, W. Ellis, and J. Watkins.) The panel was chaired by John Watkins, Superintendent of Airworthiness & Aeronautical Engineering. (Note: At the time of the inquiry, John Leslie Watkins was acting Superintendent of Airworthiness and Aeronautical Engineering in the Department of Civil Aviation.) After examining the wreckage recovered from the sea bed the panel was satisfied both engines were operating at high power at the time of impact and there was no pre-existing structural or mechanical defect that would explain the crash.

The panel arranged for the witnesses at Seven Mile Beach to observe a series of flights by a de Havilland Dragonfly (Note: VH-UXS was based at Cambridge aerodrome carrying out aerial survey work for the Tasmanian Government.) taking off from Cambridge aerodrome, and to identify which flight best represented what they saw on the night of the crash. This exercise established that VH-AET reached a maximum height of about 425 feet (130 m). The panel members were satisfied that, after take-off, VH-AET achieved a normal climb of about 325 feet per minute (1.6 m/s) and a gradient of about 1¾% before suddenly commencing a descent of about 17½%. Calculations showed that the aircraft's descent reached about 4,000 feet per minute (20 m/s) and its speed about 160 mph (260 km/h) before it struck the water.

The panel contemplated 25 (Note: The number of possible causes was also given as 22 or 23.) possible causes of the accident. In its interim report to the Director-General on 20 March 1946 the panel reduced these possible causes to 3:

=== Automatic pilot ===
The control box for the automatic pilot was recovered from the wreckage. The control knob for its gyroscope (Note: A gyroscope is the core of an aircraft's automatic pilot and attitude indicator. While the rotor is accelerating to operational speed the gyroscope should be caged (locked) to prevent damage. It should be un-caged prior to takeoff.) was in the caged position and the CAGED warning flag was in view even though the control box carried a placard stating the gyro must be uncaged before takeoff. The automatic pilot's speed valve unit was also recovered; it showed that the three valves were open in positions indicating the unit was operating at the time of the crash. The investigation panel proposed that the automatic pilot might have been engaged at a height of about 400 ft (120 m) causing the aircraft to descend swiftly into the sea. Engagement could have occurred inadvertently when one of the pilots intended to select fuel cross-feed ON. (Note: Most operators of DC-3 and C-47 aircraft carried out the takeoff with fuel cross-feed selected ON, but Australian National Airways carried out the takeoff with cross-feed selected OFF. This variation in procedure was the outcome of a near-fatal accident in 1940 when VH-USY Bungana, one of the company's DC-2 aircraft, suffered an engine fire in which the fire continued to be fed fuel from the cross-feed system.) The operating levers for fuel cross-feed and automatic pilot were the same shape, the same height above the cockpit floor, and about 12 inches (300 mm) apart on the cockpit control console.

No-one on the ground at Cambridge aerodrome saw the pilot who occupied the co-pilot seat prior to takeoff. The panel proposed that the captain may have asked the supernumerary pilot to occupy the co-pilot seat during the flight to Essendon Airport. The supernumerary pilot was on his third flight with the company and had no prior experience flying the C-47 or DC-3. (Note: Flt.Lt. Austin Clement Gibson had been discharged from the RAAF a week before the accident. He had served as a flying instructor for 5 years and had flown twin-engine Anson, Oxford, Hudson and Beaufort aircraft.) The panel considered that if the supernumerary pilot had occupied the co-pilot seat, and if the captain had called for fuel cross-feed to be turned ON to deal with a fuel pressure problem in one engine, it was possible the supernumerary pilot's lack of familiarity with the DC-3 cockpit caused him to inadvertently engage the automatic pilot. (Note: The captain would have been likely to call for fuel cross-feed to be turned ON if the fuel supply pressure in one engine became inadequate, causing a red warning lamp to illuminate in the cockpit. One witness, Michael Reynolds of Seven Mile Beach, reported hearing an unevenness in the sound of the engines as the aircraft approached. This unevenness could have been misfiring due to inadequate fuel supply pressure in one engine.)

The panel used a DC-3 aircraft with a cockpit identical to that of VH-AET to carry out four flight tests with the gyroscope caged. When the automatic pilot was engaged the control wheel moved forward so strongly it was torn from the pilot's hands, and regaining control required use of both hands and significant force. Initial tests showed that when the pilot was unprepared, up to 600 ft (180 m) could be lost before he identified the problem and disengaged the automatic pilot. On the fourth test the pilot restricted the height loss to 300 ft (91 m). The panel considered the most likely explanation of the accident was inadvertent engagement of the automatic pilot with the gyroscope caged.

=== Others ===
- Bird strike – A fortnight after the accident the mutilated body of a large bird was found on Seven-Mile Beach. It was considered the bird, which had a wingspan of about 6 ft (1.8 m), may have struck the aircraft cockpit, distracting or incapacitating the pilots. Alternatively, the bird could have struck the aircraft's pitot tube, damaging it and causing inaccuracy in the airspeed indicator.
- Pilot illness – The investigation panel considered the pilot may have collapsed suddenly. The panel used a DC-3 aircraft to carry out tests in which one of the pilots simulated falling forward onto the aircraft controls. They found it difficult to fall forward sufficiently to exert a significant force on the elevator control, and the other pilot had no difficulty keeping the aircraft in a climbing attitude.

=== Report ===
The investigation panel's report to the Director-General made recommendations including:

1. operation of the automatic pilot on-off control on Australian-registered DC-3 aircraft should be made distinctive from operation of any other control in the cockpit. (Note: This modification was made mandatory in Australia and remains mandatory vide Airworthiness Directive AD/DC3/9 Automatic Pilot Control Handle – Modification)
2. instructions should be issued impressing on pilots that gyroscopes should be un-caged prior to takeoff.
3. the practice of using passenger-carrying flights to give experience to pilots under instruction should be reviewed urgently.

== Inquiry ==
On 24 April 1946 the Minister for Civil Aviation, Arthur Drakeford, appointed Mr Justice Simpson of the Supreme Court of the Australian Capital Territory to conduct an inquiry into the accident. Counsel assisting the inquiry was to be Henry Winneke. (Note: Sir Henry Arthur Winneke was knighted in 1957 and later became Chief Justice of the Supreme Court of Victoria (1964) and Governor of Victoria (1974.))

Justice Simpson examined the evidence in detail, including the evidence put forward in support of the 3 most likely causes identified by the investigation panel. He eventually found there was insufficient evidence to consider any of the theories proved. Justice Simpson's report of the findings of his inquiry was made public by the Minister on 11 June 1946. Simpson said he was satisfied the accident was not caused by failure of any part of the aircraft's structure, its engines or its controls; or failure to remove any of the flight-control clamps prior to takeoff. (Note: Allen Lauder Hume (engineer-in-charge) and Donald James Butler (maintenance engineer), both employed at Cambridge aerodrome by Australian National Airways, advised the inquiry that all clamps had been removed from the aircraft's control surfaces before takeoff, undercarriage pins had been removed, and the engines were operating normally.)

=== Automatic pilot ===
John Watkins, chairman of the investigation panel, told the inquiry the evidence supporting the theory that inadvertent engagement of the automatic pilot caused the accident was that its control box was recovered from the wreckage and its gyroscope was still caged. The speed valve unit was also recovered and it indicated the automatic pilot was operating at the time of impact. Inadvertent engagement of the automatic pilot with the gyroscope caged could explain a sudden descent by a DC-3. Watkins also said the panel's report to the Director-General made several recommendations and they were already being actioned. These included one recommendation that operation of the automatic pilot on-off control on Australian-registered DC-3 aircraft should be made distinctive from operation of any other control in the cockpit.

The Flight Superintendent of Australian National Airways, Captain P.T.L. Taylor, told the inquiry he did not believe the accident could have been caused by inadvertent engagement of the automatic pilot. He said if that happened, the pilot could dis-engage it before losing 50 ft (15 m) in altitude. (Note: Accident Investigator and aviation writer Macarthur Job wrote: "Dr E G Coppel, KC, appeared for ANA. As Dr Coppel saw it, the Panel's assumption, integral to the events they had postulated, that Supernumerary Pilot Gibson was occupying the copilot's seat at the time of the accident, reflected adversely on his client, ANA. The evidence which Dr Coppel now drew on heavily to refute the Panel's theory was that Captain Spence had been a secret diabetic whose condition had gone undetected by medical examiners since he applied for a civil pilot's licence in 1942.")

The Chief Technical Adviser of Australian National Airways, Thomas Lawrence, (Note: Thomas Fulton Coleman Lawrence (1915–2003), aeronautical engineer. In 1965, Lawrence became Chief Superintendent of the Aeronautical Research Laboratories.) told the inquiry he did not think there was any evidence to indicate the automatic pilot was engaged at the time of the accident. He thought the crash was the result of a combination of factors.

=== Bird-strike ===
Michael Sharland, (Note: Michael Stanley Sharland was the author of Tasmanian Birds.) honorary ornithologist to the Tasmanian Museum, told the Inquiry he had been shown the mutilated remains of a dead bird and had identified it as a gannet, a fishing bird known to dive on its prey from heights from 50 ft to 500 ft. He was unable to say how the bird had died but said its injuries suggested it had been in a collision with a heavy, fast-moving body. Captain P.T.L. Taylor said he thought a bird-strike on the aircraft's pitot tube could have caused the crash.

Justice Simpson rejected the bird-strike theory, saying the descent of the aircraft was caused by forward-movement of the control column in the cockpit. He was unable to state what caused this movement of the control column.

=== Medical ===
The inquiry discovered that the chief-pilot of the aircraft, Captain Thomas Spence, (Note: Thomas William Spence was born in 1916. In February 1940 he passed a medical examination admitting him to flying training in the RAAF. He completed his flying course in Canada but was then found to be diabetic and unfit for flying. He was repatriated to Australia in April 1941 and discharged from the RAAF in September 1941. In March 1942 he passed a medical examination for initial issue of a commercial pilot licence.) was diabetic and had been discharged from the RAAF in September 1941 as medically unfit. In early 1942 he applied for a commercial pilot licence but did not declare his diabetes. In a medical examination for the purpose of obtaining the licence, and at all subsequent examinations, Spence had shown no sign of diabetes. A specialist in diabetes (Note: Dr E. Downie of Collins St, Melbourne.) told the Inquiry it was almost impossible to detect diabetes in a person who wished to withhold it.

The inquiry also received evidence that a friend (Note: The friend was identified as Mr Whitty. The day after the accident Whitty informed an officer in the Department of Civil Aviation, of Spence's diabetes. The officer sent a memorandum conveying Whitty's information but, apart from calling for Spence's RAAF history file, the investigation panel took no further action. John Watkins said the investigation panel took no further action because it believed Spence's diabetes had no bearing on the accident.) had asked Spence about his diabetes in relation to his employment as a pilot. Spence had asked his friend to keep it quiet so his employment would not be jeopardised.

The senior route captain for Australian National Airways, Captain Douglas Way, (Note: Captain Douglas Rowntree Way.) told the inquiry he was unaware Spence was treating himself with insulin. Captain Way said he knew Spence had been discharged from the RAAF as medically unfit but Spence had told him it was a minor complaint discovered when he was in Canada and when he returned to Australia he found himself cured.

At a medical examination in October 1943 for renewal of his commercial pilot licence Spence told the examiner he had been in hospital with influenza and a carbuncle. The examiner did not inquire further on the matter. Investigations with Brisbane Hospital for the purpose of informing Justice Simpson revealed that Spence's hospitalisation was for diabetic pre-coma. Justice Simpson agreed that Spence had misled many people.

Spence was scheduled to have a medical examination on 11 March and it was considered plausible that he may have taken extra insulin to prepare himself for the examination. An overdose of insulin, or irregular doses, can distort the senses and cause the muscles to be unco-ordinated.

Counsel assisting the Inquiry, Henry Winneke, advocated that the cause of the accident was Spence's diabetes. Justice Simpson was critical of the Director-General's investigation panel for considering 25 (Note: The number of possible causes was also given as 22 or 23.) possible causes of the accident but failing to consider that the department's negligence in licensing a diabetic pilot might have been the root cause of the accident. After the inquiry had received all available information related to Spence's diabetes, Justice Simpson said the insulin reaction of the pilot might have had a considerable bearing on the accident.

In Justice Simpson's report to the Governor-General he wrote that he could see much to support the theory that the most likely cause was Spence's actions in the cockpit while he was adversely affected by insulin. However, in his report he didn't determine that the accident had been caused by Spence's medical condition because there was insufficient evidence to completely prove the theory.

=== Irregularities ===
During the court of inquiry Justice Simpson became aware of four irregularities and listed them in his report.

1. When Thomas Spence had applied for a commercial pilot licence the RAAF Director-General of Medical Services had been acting as assessor for the Department of Civil Aviation. The Director-General had neglected to check Spence's RAAF medical history.
2. A medical examiner had failed to check Spence's statement that his recent hospitalisation was due to influenza. The truth was that Spence had been suffering a serious diabetic condition.
3. VH-AET was approved to carry 24 persons. On 10 March 1946 the aircraft took off with 25 persons on board – a full complement of 21 passengers, an air hostess and 3 pilots instead of the usual 2. (Note: Evidence was given that when a temporary seat was installed in the cockpit for a supernumerary pilot, a document could be issued to authorise an extra person being carried.)
4. No flare path had been lit to illuminate the runway for takeoff and any unexpected return to the aerodrome for landing.

=== Recommendations ===
Justice Simpson made five recommendations:

1. The practice of allowing pilots under instruction to gain experience in the cockpit of aircraft carrying passengers should be reviewed.
2. The levers that actuate the automatic pilot and the fuel cross-feed should be modified so they have a different appearance.
3. A regulation should be made to prohibit taking off at night without a flare path or other runway lighting system; and it should be compulsory for the flare path to remain lit until there is no longer a possibility the aircraft might return to the airport to land.
4. Ground engineers completing daily inspections should keep copies of their inspection records.
5. Medical examinations for issue or renewal of pilot licences should be made by doctors chosen, and paid for, by the Department of Civil Aviation.

== Coronial inquest ==
The Tasmania Coroner, Mr Sorell, investigated the deaths of the 21 people whose bodies had been recovered. He determined that the causes of their deaths were multiple fractures and injuries but he was unable to say how or in what manner they met their deaths.

== Flight crew ==
The captain was Thomas Spence, aged 30. He had about 3,500 hours flying experience and had been a captain of Douglas DC-3 aircraft for a year. He joined Australian National Airways in June 1942.

The co-pilot was David Collum, aged 21. He had about 1,400 hours flying experience, mostly with Australian National Airways.

The supernumerary pilot was Austin Gibson, aged 37. He had about 2,500 hours flying experience in the RAAF; half of this as a flying instructor. He had over 1,000 hours in command of twin-engine Anson, Oxford, Hudson and Beaufort aircraft but no experience on the Douglas C-47 or DC-3.

== Aircraft ==
The aircraft was constructed in 1942 as a Douglas C-47-DL transport aircraft with a Douglas serial number 6013. It was assigned the US military serial number 41-18652 and in 1943 was delivered to the US Army Air Force in Brisbane. In November 1944, it was sold to the Commonwealth of Australia. Twelve C-47s were purchased by the Commonwealth of Australia and hired out under charter to aviation companies, six to Australian National Airways.

The aircraft was registered VH-AET by the Commonwealth and hired out to Australian National Airways on 20 December 1944. Australian National Airways converted it to the civil aircraft configuration about a year before the crash. VH-AET flew for 7,477 hours.

== See also ==
- 1948 Australian National Airways DC-3 crash – Accident in New South Wales
- 1949 MacRobertson Miller Aviation DC-3 crash – Accident in Perth, Western Australia
- List of disasters in Australia by death toll
- List of accidents and incidents involving commercial aircraft
- List of accidents and incidents involving airliners by location

== Bibliography ==
- Job, Macarthur (1992). Air Crash Vol. 2, Chapter 3. Aerospace Publications Pty. Ltd. Fyshwick, Australia. pp. 200. ISBN 1-875671-01-3
