= Mangalore Airport (Victoria) =

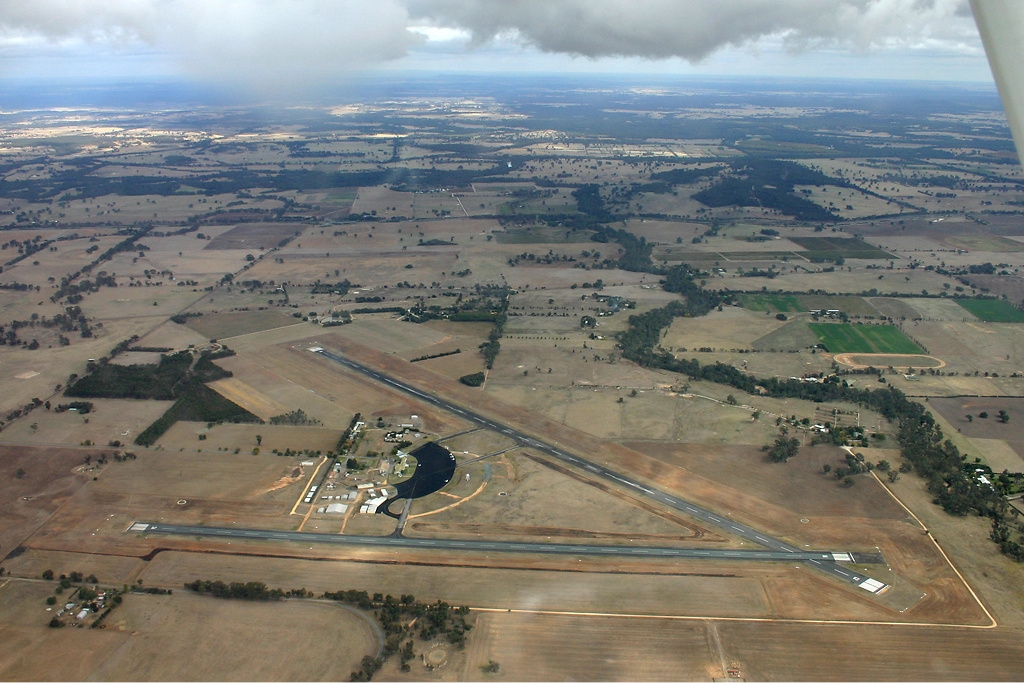
- IATA: none; ICAO: YMNG

Summary
- Airport type: Public
- Operator: Mangalore Airport Pty Ltd
- Location: Mangalore, Victoria
- Elevation AMSL: 467 ft (142 m)
- Coordinates: 36°53′18″S 145°11′03″E

Map
- Location in Victoria

Runways
Direction	Length		Surface
Direction	m	ft	Surface
05/23	2,027	6,650	Asphalt
18/36	1,461	4,793	Asphalt
- Sources: Australian AIP and aerodrome chart

Mangalore Airport (ICAO: YMNG) is located 2 nautical miles (3.7 km; 2.3 mi) west of Avenel, Victoria, Australia. The airport is about 2 hours north of Melbourne by road, and is home to Inbound Aviation (Mangalore Campus)

== History ==
Mangalore Airport was established in 1939 for training Royal Australian Air Force pilots. In 1947 it became a civil airfield, and until 1970 it was an alternative to Essendon Airport.

From November 2007 to April 2009, the airport was home to the Australian Airline Pilot Academy (AAPA), owned by Rex Airlines. AAPA relocated to Wagga Wagga Airport, New South Wales, in 2009.

From June 2017 to January 2023, Moorabbin Aviation Services Pty Ltd established a campus at Mangalore Airport where they undertook pilot training of international students. One of their major clients was China Southern Airlines, training their airline cadets.

In February 2023, Inbound Aviation established a campus at Mangalore Airport, where they began to undertake pilot training of Australian students.

== Accidents and incidents ==
- On 29 December 1948, a passenger-empty Australian National Airways Douglas DC-3 from Launceston crashed short of the runway after diverting from Essendon. The aircraft was badly damaged but the crew was unhurt.
- On 31 October 1954, the first Vickers Viscount aircraft delivered to Australia crashed on take-off for a training flight only days after its arrival in Australia, killing 3 of the 7 people on board.
- On 19 February 2020, a Piper PA-44-180 and a Beechcraft D95A collided mid-air resulting in four fatalities; the wreckage of the PA-44-180 landed to the south of the Hume Freeway and the Beech D95A to the north.
