= Australian National Airways Flight 331 =

Accident in New South Wales

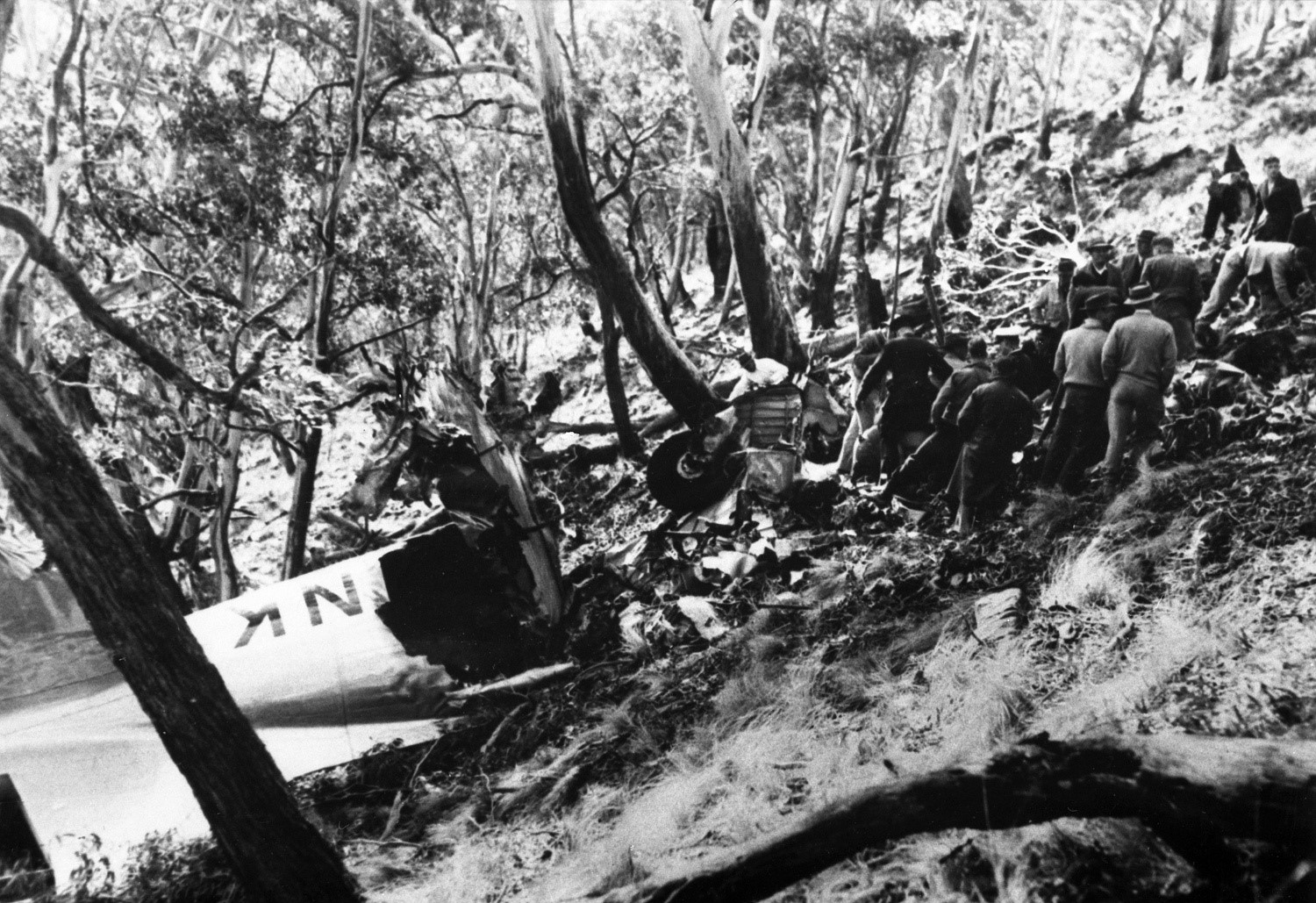
- The crash site

Accident
- Date: 2 September 1948
- Summary: CFIT
- Site: Near Nundle, New South Wales, Australia; 31.511°S 150.933°E

Aircraft
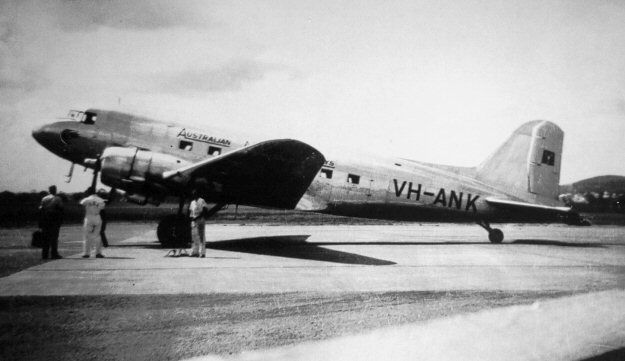
- VH-ANK, the aircraft involved in the accident
- Aircraft type: Douglas DC-3C-SIC3G
- Aircraft name: Lutana
- Operator: Australian National Airways
- Registration: VH-ANK (c/n 9999)
- Flight origin: Eagle Farm Airport, Brisbane, Queensland, Australia
- Destination: Sydney Airport, Sydney, New South Wales, Australia
- Passengers: 10
- Crew: 3
- Fatalities: 13
- Survivors: 0

Australian National Airways Flight 331 was a passenger flight on 2 September 1948, operated by Lutana, a Douglas DC-3 of Australian National Airways, which crashed into high terrain en route from Brisbane to Sydney, killing all 13 on board. A judicial enquiry by a Supreme Court Judge determined that the crash was caused by errors in radio navigation equipment used by the pilot to navigate the route from Brisbane to Sydney.

One of the passengers was Margaret McIntyre, the first woman elected to the Parliament of Tasmania.

== Flight ==
On 2 September 1948, the Lutana departed Brisbane's airport on a scheduled flight to Sydney. About 280 nautical miles (520 km) south of Brisbane it crashed into rising terrain in the North West Slopes of Australia's Great Dividing Range, due to an erroneously determined position based on errors in the navigational equipment the pilots relied upon for determining a safe course through the rising terrain.

== Inquiry ==
An Air Court of Inquiry was conducted by Judge William Simpson of the Supreme Court of the Australian Capital Territory, and two assessors, E. J. Bowen, Sci. D, PhD; and Captain L. M. Diprose, chief pilot of Associated Airlines, nominated by the Australian Pilots Association. The inquiry report, released 17 November 1948, found the pilot, Captain J. A. Drummond, to be a "pilot of more than ordinary ability," and led to a reorganisation of the Department of Civil Aviation’s system of air traffic control. The inquiry found that the probable cause of the crash was interference with the aeroplane's magnetic compass due to a nearby electrical storm and a temporary defect in the navigational signals sent by the Government-maintained Kempsey low-frequency radio range station, an important navigational aid to flights in the area. The inquiry also identified errors and deficiencies in the aeronautical charts used to navigate the mountainous area.

Australia's then Air Minister, Arthur Drakeford, objected to the findings of the inquiry, stating that the lack of definitive evidence in the report rendered its findings "inconclusive," and that the assertion that the Kempsey range station malfunctioned temporarily was "difficult to believe."

== Memorial ==
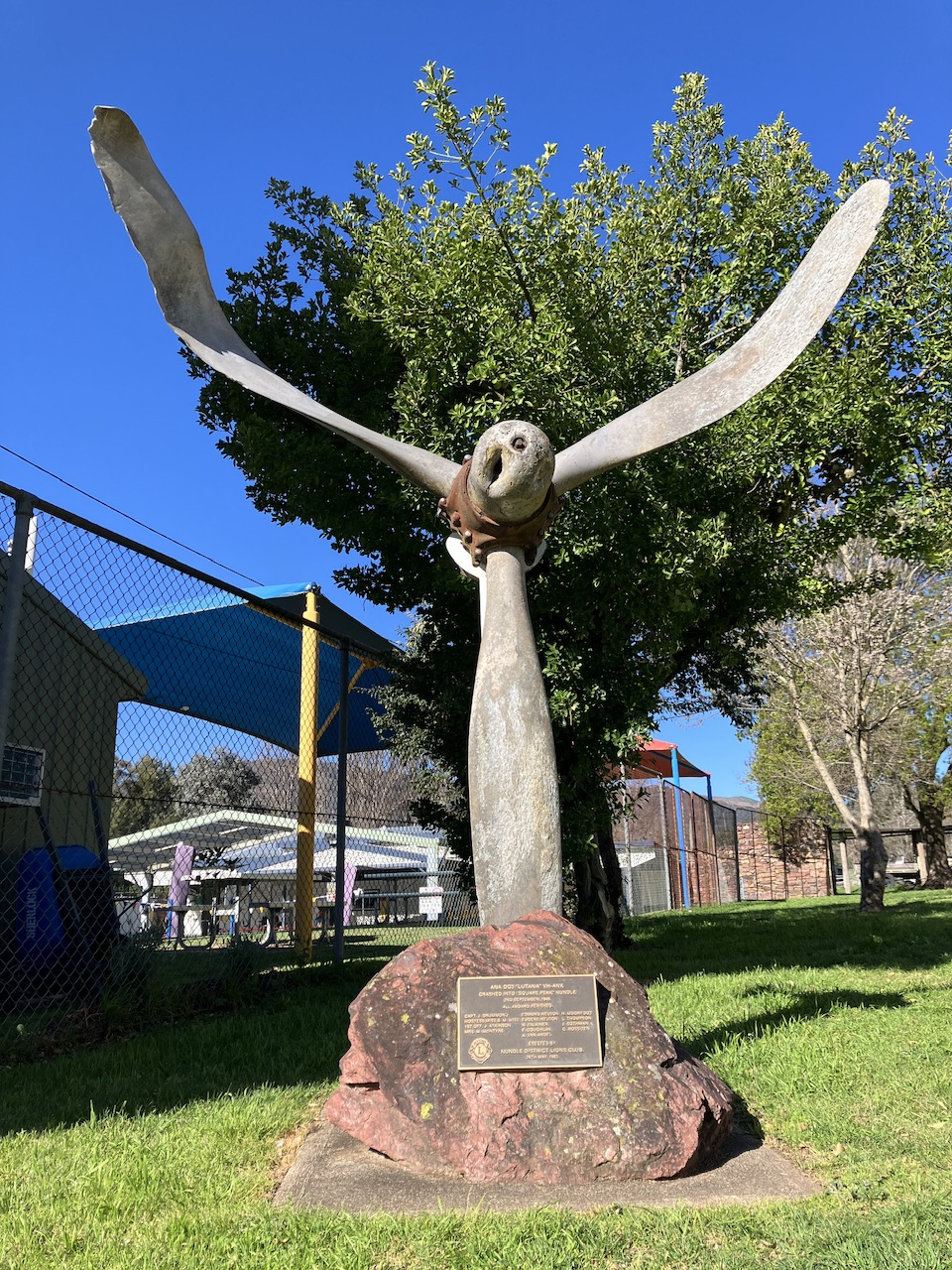
Memorial in Nundle

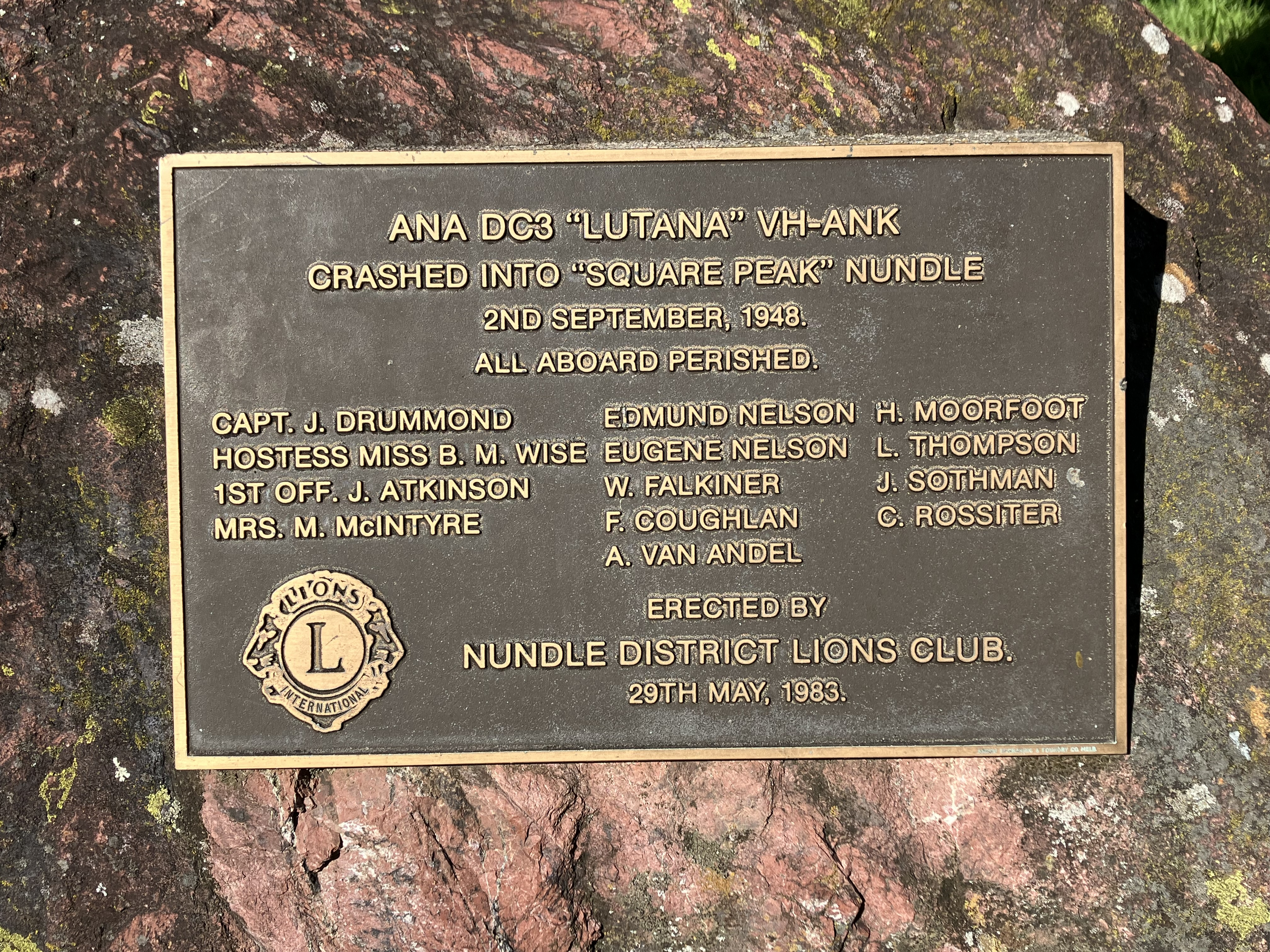
Plaque on the memorial

A memorial was created in the town of Nundle in 1983. It consists of one of the damaged propellers from the aircraft and a bronze plaque listing the names of those who died in the accident.

== See also ==
- 1946 Australian National Airways DC-3 crash – Accident in Hobart
- 1949 MacRobertson Miller Aviation DC-3 crash – Accident in Western Australia

== Bibliography ==
- Job, Macarthur (1992). Air Crash Vol. 2, Chapter 5. Aerospace Publications Pty. Ltd. Fyshwick, Australia. pp. 200. ISBN 1-875671-01-3
