= Macarthur Job =

Australian aviation writer

Macarthur Job (10 April 1926 in Taree, New South Wales – 6 August 2014 in Melbourne) was an Australian aviation writer and air safety consultant. He published nine books on aviation safety. He was formerly a Flying Doctor pilot and held a pilot licence until his death.

Job was a Senior Inspector with the Air Safety Investigation Branch of the Australian Department of Civil Aviation, and for 14 years was editor of the Department’s Aviation Safety Digest. The magazine won the US Flight Safety Foundation's Publication of the Year award. In 1980 he was appointed editor of the Australian aviation industry journal Aircraft, published by the Herald & Weekly Times. A year later, as a member of the Guild of Air Pilots and Air Navigators, he was granted the Freedom of the City of London.

In 1984, he became a working Director of the Missionary Aviation Fellowship (MAF) - a professional, non-profit organisation which operates more than 40 aircraft in community development work in Papua New Guinea and outback Australia. In 1989 he began working as an independent aviation writer, specialising in air safety.

At the Australian International Airshow in 1997, Job was presented with the Aviation Safety Foundation’s award for ‘Aviation Safety Excellence’ and the AOPA’s Adams Trophy. In the Queen's Birthday Honours for 2003, he was awarded the Medal of the Order of Australia (OAM) for ‘services to the promotion and advancement of aviation safety’.

He contributed to Australian Aviation, Aero Australia and the Civil Aviation Safety Authority’s Flight Safety Australia magazines. He has also written for the British Aeroplane, the U.S Flying and Airways magazines, for Time, the Sydney Morning Herald, The Age and The Sun-Herald newspapers. He was a consultant for the TV series Black Box and flew as a staff pilot with the Scout Air Activity Centre in Victoria.

== Books ==
- Job, Macarthur (1991). Air crash. Weston Creek, ACT: Aerospace Publications. ISBN 0-9587978-9-7. OCLC 28964777.
- Job, Macarthur (1991). Air crash: Volume 2. Weston Creek, ACT: Aerospace Publications. ISBN 0-9587978-9-7. OCLC 28964777.
- Job, Macarthur (22 February 1995). Air disaster: Volume 1. Weston Creek, ACT: Aerospace Publications. ISBN 1-875671-11-0. OCLC 32525844.
- Job, Macarthur (6 August 1996). Air disaster: Volume 2. Weston Creek, ACT: Aerospace Publications. ISBN 1-875671-11-0. OCLC 32525844.
- Job, Macarthur (30 April 1999). Air disaster: Volume 3. Weston Creek, ACT: Aerospace Publications. ISBN 1-875671-11-0. OCLC 32525844.
- Job, Macarthur (13 September 2001). Air disaster: Volume 4: the Propeller Era. Weston Creek, ACT: Aerospace Publications. ISBN 1-875671-11-0. OCLC 32525844.
- Job, Macarthur (25 October 2008). Disaster in the Dandenongs : the Kyeema airliner tragedy (1st ed.). Ferntree Gully, Vic.: Sierra Publishinig. ISBN 978-0-9804686-4-9. OCLC 271846272.
- Job, Macarthur (20 June 2010). Into oblivion : the Southern Cloud Airliner enigma (1st ed.). Ferntree Gully, Vic.: Sierra Publishing. ISBN 978-0-9804686-9-4. OCLC 501273186.

(Air Disaster, Volumes 1-3 illustrated by Matthew Tesch. Air Disaster Volume 4 illustrated by Juanita Franzi. Cover paintings for Disaster in the Dandenongs and Into Oblivion by Norman Clifford.)
