= List of disasters in Australia by death toll =

This is a list of disasters in Australia by death toll.

== 100 or more deaths ==
Disaster	Location	Deaths	Date	Notes
Pandemic	Australia-wide	19,265	2020 Jan – 2023 May	COVID-19 pandemic in Australia, part of the worldwide COVID-19 pandemic.
Pandemic	Australia-wide	12,000+	1918–1920	1918 flu pandemic.
Epidemic	Australia-wide	8,000+	1875–1876	Scarlet fever epidemic.
Volcanic eruption	Territory of Papua and New Guinea (Note: Now located in the Papua-New Guinea, back then it was part of Australia.)	2,942	1951 Jan	1951 eruption of Mount Lamington.
Industrial	Wittenoom	2,000+	1940s–1960s	Environmental and public health catastrophe. It involved the mining of blue asbestos at Wittenoom Gorge from the 1940s to the 1960s. Due to inadequate safety measures, workers and residents were exposed to asbestos fibres, leading to widespread cases of asbestosis, lung cancer, and mesothelioma. It is known as the worst industrial catastrophe in Australian history.
Epidemic	Western Australia	1,879+	1891–1910	1891-1910 Western Australia typhoid epidemic: Australia's worst typhoid epidemic. Worst-affected areas were the WA Goldfields where overcrowding and unsanitary living conditions were rife. Official death toll was close to 2,000 but actual toll much higher.
Epidemic	Australia-wide	1,013	1946–1955	Polio epidemic.
Epidemic	New South Wales	750 to 2,600	1789	Smallpox epidemic among Aboriginal peoples
Epidemic	Sydney, New South Wales	748	1867 Feb–June	Measles epidemic in Sydney city & inner suburbs. Most of the victims were children under the age of 4.
Epidemic	Australia-wide	535	1900–1925	Bubonic plague.
Bushfires	Australia-wide	479	2019–2020	The Black Summer bushfires killed 479 people; 34 people from flames, and 445 people from smoke exposure. Future deaths from cardiovascular conditions and cancer are predicted.
Heat wave	Victoria	438	1938 Dec – 1939 Feb	Heat wave killed 438 and sparked the Black Friday bushfires (see below).
Heat wave	South-eastern Australia	437	1895 Dec – 1896 Jan	Widespread heat wave killed 437, including 47 in Bourke, New South Wales.
Cyclone	Bathurst Bay, Queensland	410	4 Mar 1899	Cyclone Mahina; estimated toll.
Shipwreck	King Island, Tasmania	406	4 Aug 1845	The Cataraqui was wrecked when it crashed into rocks off the coast of King Island in stormy weather at 4:30 in the morning on 4 August. With 400 dead (another source states 406), it was Australia's worst civil maritime disaster.
Heat wave	South-eastern Australia	374	25 Jan 2009 – 9 Feb	A nine-day heat wave in early 2009 in which Adelaide recorded six consecutive days over 40 °C (104 °F), a high of 45.7 °C (114.3 °F) and a record overnight minimum of 33.9 °C (93.0 °F) on 28 January. Sparked the Black Saturday bushfires (see below). Health authorities attribute 374 deaths to the heat wave.
Massacre	Gippsland Victoria	300+	1840–1850	Gippsland massacres – The Aboriginal people of East Gippsland, Victoria, Australia, known as the Gunai/Kurnai people, fought against the European colonisation of their traditional hunting grounds. Estimated 300 people were killed.
Shipwreck	coast near Murchison River, Western Australia	286	1712 Jun	Sinking of Dutch ship Zuytdorp, which was wrecked off the coast near Kalbarri. There has been speculation that there were survivors, who may have been assisted by local Aboriginal Australians.
Sinking	Off North Stradbroke Island, Queensland	268	14 May 1943	Centaur memorial Sinking of AHS Centaur. Hospital ship torpedoed by a Japanese submarine. The Centaur memorial, in Point Danger, Coolangatta, Queensland, commemorates the sinking of the hospital ship AHS Centaur in 1943, which claimed 268 lives.
Heat wave	Southern states	246	1907 Dec – 1908 Jan	There were 105 deaths in South Australia alone (between 7 December 1907 and 8 February 1908).
Air raids	Darwin, Northern Territory	243	19 Feb 1942	Japanese air raids on Darwin First bombings of Darwin. The first Japanese air raids against Australia. There were two air raids on Darwin on 19 February 1942, the first one began around 10 am, the second around 11:45 am. The toll may have been higher because itinerants and Aboriginal Australians may be under-represented in the official count.
Prison break	Cowra, New South Wales	235–238	5 Aug 1944	Cowra breakout. Japanese prisoners of war Escape by Japanese POWs. Japanese prisoners of war practise baseball on the sports ground near their quarters, several weeks before the 1944 Cowra breakout, in which at least 235 people died
Pandemic	Australia-wide	234	1890	1889–90 flu pandemic
Shipwreck	King Island, Tasmania	224	13 May 1835	The convict ship the Neva, was wrecked on Navarine Reef near King Island in the early hours of 13 May 1835.
Shipwreck	Western Australia	212	1726	Aagtekerke. Possibly WA, but there is some doubt on this.
Massacre	Coniston Station, Northern Territory	200	14 Aug 1928 – 14 Oct	Coniston massacre
Pandemic	Australia-wide	191	2009	2009 flu pandemic in Australia. 191 confirmed deaths. Death toll possibly as high as 1600.
Shipwreck	Ledge Point, Western Australia	186	28 Apr 1656	The Vergulde Draeck bound for Batavia, was wrecked near Ledge Point on 28 April 1656.
Bushfires	Victoria	173	7 Feb 2009	The Black Saturday bushfires broke out on 7 February 2009, strong winds gusted up to 100 km/h, allowing the fires to spread quickly. The final death toll was 173, with over 2000 houses destroyed.
Cyclone/sinking	Western Australia	150+	21–22 Mar 1912	The SS Koombana was lost in a cyclone between Port Hedland and Broome during a cyclone with all on board (around 158 people). The cyclone crossed the Western Australia coast around Mbalabala, early on 22nd. Several other ships and vessels were also wrecked in the cyclone, claiming another 15 lives.
Heat waves	Australia-wide	147	1920–1921	
Heat waves	Australia-wide	143 +	1911–1912	
Cyclone	Broome, Western Australia	141	26 Mar 1935	Pearling fleet devastated.
Cyclone	Eighty Mile Beach, Western Australia	140	1884	Pearling fleet sunk.
Cyclone	Eighty Mile Beach, Western Australia	140	22 Apr 1887	A late season cyclone hit the Eighty Mile Beach area (then known as Ninety Mile Beach), devastating the pearling fleet there, killing 140 people and around 20 boats lost.
Shipwreck	D'Entrecasteaux Channel, Tasmania	133	12 Apr 1835	George III
Shipwreck	Cape York, Queensland	133	28 Feb 1890	The RMS Quetta, sank in around 3 minutes, with the loss of 134 of her 292 passengers and crew.
Heat wave	Southern states	130	1926 Dec – 1927 Jan	
Shipwreck/mutiny/ massacre	Abrolhos Islands, Western Australia	125+	1629 Jun – Jul	The Dutch ship Batavia was wrecked in the Abrolhos Islands early on 4 June 1629. After some of the crew left for help, mutineers murdered at least 125 of the survivors, while 40 drowned when the wreck broke up. This toll does not include the mutineers, seven of whom were hanged and two cast away after the remaining passengers had been rescued. Most of the remaining mutineers were later executed.
Heat wave	Australia-wide	122 +	1913–1914	
Cyclone/sinking	North-eastern Queensland	122	16 Mar 1911	SS Yongala
Shipwreck	Sydney	121	20 Aug 1857	Dunbar. 1 survivor.
Heat wave	Australia-wide	112	1939–1940	
Heat wave	Australia-wide	109	1909 Dec – 1910 Feb	
Heat wave	Southern regions, Australia	105 +	1959 Jan – Feb	Some sources puts the death toll at 145.
Cyclone/sinking	Ayr, Queensland	102–112	24 Feb 1875	SS Gothenburg. Records of passengers vary.

== 50 to 99 deaths ==
Disaster	Location	Deaths	Date	Notes
Heat wave	Southern regions Australia	99	1972 Dec – 1973 Feb	
Cyclone	Northern Queensland	99	12 Mar 1934	A tropical cyclone crossed the North Queensland coast around Cape Tribulation, which generated a 9.1 storm surge. A pearling fleet off the coast was damaged, with 75 people reported lost (one source says 99).
Explosion	Mount Kembla, New South Wales	96	31 Jul 1902	Mount Kembla Mine disaster. Coal mine gas explosion
Shipwreck	Montebello Islands, Western Australia	93	24 May 1622	Tryall. Earliest recorded Australian shipwreck.
Flood	Gundagai, New South Wales	89	24–25 Jun 1852	A severe flash flood destroyed the town of Gundagai, which resulted in 89 deaths.
Shipwreck	Near Carpenter Rocks, in South East South Australia	89	6 Aug 1859	SS Admella. South Australia's worst loss of life.
Air raid	Broome, Western Australia	88	3 Mar 1942	Air raid on Broome. Japanese fighter planes strafed the town. Official toll; may not include some refugees from the Dutch East Indies.
Rail accident	Sydney	84	18 Jan 1977	Granville railway disaster. Derailment followed by bridge collapse.
Sinking	Twenty miles south-east of Jervis Bay, New South Wales	82	10 Feb 1964	Melbourne–Voyager collision – HMAS Voyager sank after collision with HMAS Melbourne.
Explosion	Bulli, New South Wales	81	23 Mar 1887	Bulli Colliery coal mine gas explosion.
Shipwreck	King Island, Tasmania	79	23 May 1874	British Admiral
Cyclone	Queensland coast, particularly Innisfail	77+	10 Mar 1918	Cyclone and storm surge with death toll estimated between 77 and 100.
Storms	New South Wales between Port Stephens and Sydney	77	12 Jul 1866	60 lives lost on SS Cawarra alone.
Explosion	Mount Mulligan, Queensland	75	19 Sep 1921	Mount Mulligan mine disaster caused by coal dust explosion.
Bushfire	Victoria and South Australia	75	16 Feb 1983	Ash Wednesday bushfires
Shipwreck	Green Cape, New South Wales	71	30 May 1886	The steamship Ly-Ee-Moon was wrecked during a violent gale on 30 May 1886 near Green Cape, resulting in around 71 deaths.
Bushfire	Victoria	71	13 Jan 1939	Black Friday bushfires.
Cyclone	Darwin	71	25 Dec 1974	Cyclone Tracy destroys the city of Darwin on Christmas Day 1974. Top wind gust recorded was 217 kilometres per hour (135 mph). On 17 March 2005, a Northern Territory Coroner's Inquest outcome increased the official death toll from 65 to 71.
Flood	Clermont, Queensland	65	27 Dec 1916	
Bushfire	Tasmania	64	7 Feb 1967	Now known as Black Tuesday, 64 people died, and 7,000 left homeless as over a hundred fires burned in southern Tasmania.
Cyclone	Near Roebourne and Geraldton, Western Australia	61–71	1894 Jan	Estimated toll includes those lost at sea and those killed in flooding at Geraldton.
Shipwreck	Houtman Abrolhos Islands, Western Australia	60	1727	Zeewyk. Approximate death toll
Shipwreck	Newcastle, New South Wales	60	12 Jul 1866	The paddle steamer SS Cawarra sank during a storm in Newcastle Harbour, there was only one survivor.
Bushfire	Victoria	60	1926 Feb–Mar	The worst fires occurred on 14 February (Black Sunday) in the Gippsland region and other areas, where 31 people died at Warburton, Victoria. Houses and buildings were destroyed in many places including Erica and Belgrave. The town of Noojee was destroyed, with only the hotel left standing. In all, over the two-month period, 60 people died and 1,000 buildings were destroyed.
Cyclone	Exmouth Gulf, Western Australia	59–69	1875 Dec – 1876 Jan	Most casualties were at sea.
Shipwreck	Mutton Bird Island, off the Shipwreck Coast of Victoria	53	1 Jun 1878	Loch Ard. Sources vary on exact death toll (2 survivors).
Epidemic	Southern States	51	1881–1885	Smallpox epidemic.
Bushfire	Victoria	51	22 Dec 1943 – 15 Feb 1944	Bushfires broke out in various parts of Victoria from late December 1943 to mid February 1944, resulting in 51 deaths, and destroying 500 buildings.
Shipwreck	Brisbane, Queensland	50	13 Feb 1896	Capsize of the ferry Pearl
Cyclone	Around Broome, Western Australia	50	26–27 Apr 1908	A tropical cyclone impacted the Broome region, which wrecked the pearling fleet in the area, and resulted in the loss of 50 lives.

== 20 to 49 deaths ==
Disaster	Location	Deaths	Date	Notes
Shipwreck	Christmas Island	48	15 Dec 2010	2010 Christmas Island boat disaster
Cyclone/Flood	Cairns and Cardwell, Queensland	47	9 Feb 1927	This tropical cyclone crossed the coast north of Cairns, which weakened into a rain depression, causing extensive flooding, resulting in a total 47 deaths throughout parts of Northern Queensland
Cyclonic effects	New South Wales, North Coast	46	1923	
Rail accident	Sunshine, Victoria	44	20 Apr 1908	Sunshine rail disaster. A passenger train ran into the back of stationary train at Sunshine, near Melbourne; resulting in 44 people dead and 413 people were injured
Fire	Queenstown, Tasmania	42+	12 Oct 1912	1912 North Mount Lyell Disaster. Mine fire. True toll may be higher due to subsequent deaths from the effects of the fire
Sinking	Sydney	40–42	3 Nov 1927	Greycliffe disaster
Shipwreck	Near Edithburgh, South Australia	40	31 Jan 1909	SS Clan Ranald
Cyclone	Broome, Western Australia	40	19 Nov 1910	This tropical cyclone was probably Broome's most destructive, with maximum wind gusts estimated to be 175 kilometres per hour (109 mph). There were 40 deaths, and 34 pearling luggers lost with severe damage in the Broome area.
Air disaster	Near Mackay, Queensland	40	14 Jun 1943	Bakers Creek air crash. USAAF B-17 Flying Fortress crashes shortly after take-off
Flooding	Queensland	38	2010 Dec – 2011 Jan	2010–11 Queensland floods. 38 confirmed deaths plus 6 people missing (presumed dead)
Shipwreck	Cardwell, Queensland	36	1872	Shipwreck Maria. Some of the survivors were killed by Aboriginal people, other survivors were helped by Aboriginal people
Sinking	Woolgoolga, New South Wales	35–48	8 Dec 1886	Solitary Islands, Keilawarra – Helen Nicoll collision
Shipwreck	Jervis Bay, New South Wales	35	1 Sep 1876	The steamer Dandenong lost during severe storm
Shipwreck	Cheviot Beach, Victoria	35	20 Oct 1887	SS Cheviot
Flood	Melbourne suburbs and southern Victoria	35	29 Nov 1934 – 1 Dec 1934	Torrential rainfall of up to 350 millimetres (14 in). Yarra River becomes raging torrent. Extensive damage with 35 dead, 250 injured, and 3,000 homeless
Bridge collapse	Melbourne	35	15 Oct 1970	West Gate Bridge. 35 construction workers died due to a collapse during construction. Australia's worst industrial accident.
Road accident	Kempsey, New South Wales	35	22 Dec 1989	Kempsey bus crash
Shooting	Port Arthur, Tasmania	35	28 Apr 1996	Port Arthur massacre
Bushfire	Australia-wide	34	2019 Oct – 2020 Jan	2019–20 Australian bushfire season. Death toll included 3 US fire-fighters.
Shipwreck	Near Southend, South Australia	31	14 Jun 1876	Geltwood. Wreck not found for two weeks. No survivors.
Shipwreck	Off Wilsons Promontory in Bass Strait, Victoria	31	1 Dec 1935	SS Paringa Sunk during storm while towing another vessel. All officers and crew lost.
Air accident	Canal Creek, Queensland	31	1943 19 Dec	Canal Creek air crash of Dakota C-47 of the 22d Troop Carrier Squadron, all on board killed.
Insurrection	Castle Hill, New South Wales	30*	4–5 Mar 1804	Castle Hill convict rebellion. An additional nine convicts were later executed for participating in the rebellion. *Exact death toll unknown, likely to be higher. Memorial at Castle Hill gives a figure of 45 lives lost.
Cyclone	Queensland coast, particularly Mackay	30	1918 Jan	Mackay Cyclone
Fire	Melbourne	30	13 Aug 1966	William Booth Memorial Home fire – Australia's deadliest building fire. Salvation Army home for destitute men.
Air accident	Near York, east of Perth, Western Australia	29	26 Jun 1950	The 1950 Australian National Airways Douglas DC-4 crash. The plane crashed in bushland near York, burning on impact, with 28 people dying instantly (there was 1 survivor who later died from his injuries.
Air accident	Mackay, Queensland	29	10 Jun 1960	Trans Australia Airlines Flight 538 crashed into sea.
Cyclone/sinking.	Western Australia	29	17–20 Apr 1991	Tropical Cyclone Fifi. 27 were lost in shipwreck of Mineral Diamond, off the Western Australia coastline.
Massacre	Myall Creek, near Inverell, New South Wales	28	9 Jun 1838	Myall Creek massacre. 28 Aboriginal people killed by white stockmen
Riot and insurrection	Ballarat, Victoria	28	3 Dec 1854	Eureka Stockade. 28 confirmed, exact death toll remains unknown, could possibly be as high as 80.
Cyclone	Darwin, Northern Territory	28	1897 Jan	1897 Darwin cyclone
Shipwreck	Kangaroo Island, South Australia	27	1905 Sep	Loch Vennachar
Rail accident	Murulla, New South Wales	27	13 Sep 1926	The Murulla rail accident. The North West Mail train collided with five runaway wagons at Murulla, near Murrurundi, which resulted in 27 deaths.
Sea battle	Port Jackson, New South Wales	27	31 May 1942 – 1 Jun 1942	Attack on Sydney Harbour. Japanese submarine attack on allied shipping. Death toll includes attackers.
Air accident	Cleveland Bay, Townsville, Queensland	27	7 Aug 1943	C-47 Dakota plane crash. Plane crashed after takeoff.
Shipwreck/massacre	Coorong, South Australia	26	1840	Maria. Survivors murdered. Brutal punitive expedition ordered by Governor Gawler.
Explosion	Wagga Wagga, New South Wales	26	21 May 1945	Kapooka Army Base soldiers received instruction of demolition work in a bunker which was 3 metres (9.8 ft) below the ground when an explosion took place which resulted in Australia's largest military funeral.
Cyclone	Gold Coast and northern New South Wales	26–30	20–21 Feb 1954	A tropical cyclone (known as The Gold Coast Cyclone) crossed the coast late evening on 20 February 1954 at Coolangatta. Extreme rainfall associated with the cyclone produced record totals, including 900mm at Springbrook, Queensland in the 24 hours crossing and 809mm at Dorrigo, New South Wales in 24 hours to 9 am on 21st. There was widespread severe flooding over many areas of NSW and between 26 and 30 people died in the event.
Air accident	Port Hedland, Western Australia	26	31 Dec 1968	In-flight break up of MacRobertson Miller Airlines Flight 1750 (Vickers Viscount)
Rail accident	Wodonga, Victoria	25	1943	Wodonga level crossing accident. Passenger steam train collided with a bus carrying thirty-four army personnel
Air accident	Seven-Mile Beach, near Hobart, Tasmania	25	1946 Mar	1946 Australian National Airways DC-3 crashed into the sea.
Flood	Hunter Valley, New South Wales	25	1955 Feb	1955 Hunter Valley floods. Most deaths were around Singleton and Maitland, but most other river systems in the state were also in flood.
Shipwreck	Gosford, New South Wales	24	6 May 1898	Maitland
Cyclone	Onslow, Western Australia	24	5–6 Apr 1909	A tropical cyclone crossed the coast near Onslow, causing extensive damage in the town, with the tramline partly washed away. Four luggers and 24–25 crew were lost during the cyclone.
Air accident	Winton, Queensland	24	22 Sep 1966	Ansett-ANA Viscount disaster. Flight 149 en route Mount Isa – Longreach.
Air accident	Kudjeru Gap, in the Australian Territory of Papua and New Guinea (Note: Now located in the Papua-New Guinea, back then it was part of Australia.)	24	1972 Aug	RAAF Caribou aircraft crashes in rugged mountainous country en route from Lae to Port Moresby, killing 24 of the 28 people on board.
Bushfire	Southern regions of Victoria	23	1969 Jan	280 fires. 17 casualties at Lara
Mine disaster	Creswick, Victoria	22	12 Dec 1882	New Australasia gold mine. 44 miners trapped when a flooded mine shaft is breached. 22 men drown.
Flood	Northern Tasmania	22	1929 Apr	Eight drowned when truck ploughed into river and 14 died when dam collapsed and wall swept into town.
Heat wave	South-east Queensland	22	2000 Jan	
Flood	Queensland and New South Wales	22	2022 Feb – Mar	2022 eastern Australia floods. Severe flooding across South East Queensland and Northern Rivers in New South Wales resulted in 22 deaths.
Shipwreck	Off Gabo Island, Victoria	21	1 Mar 1901	SS Federal vanished without trace. All crewmembers lost.
Air accident	Coolangatta, Queensland	21	10 Mar 1949	1949 Queensland Airlines Lockheed Lodestar crash – aircraft crashed shortly after take-off due to incorrect loading.
Shipwreck	Smokey Cape, New South Wales	21	25 Aug 1969	The Noongah sank.
Road accident	Grafton, New South Wales	21	20 Oct 1989	Grafton bus crash. A head-on collision between a tourist coach and a truck.

== Between 10 and 20 ==
Disaster	Location	Deaths	Date	Notes
Air accident	Mossman, Queensland	20	7 Sep 1944	Royal Netherlands East Indies Air Force Douglas C-47 Dakota crashes en route between Merauke, Dutch East Indies and Cairns
Shipwreck	Trial Bay, New South Wales	19–21	1816 Sep	
Fire	Kings Cross, New South Wales	19	25 Aug 1981	Rembrandt Hotel
Air accident	Rewan, south of Rolleston, Queensland	19	16 Nov 1943	Rewan air crash of Dakota C-47 of the 21st Troop Carrier Squadron crashed, all killed
Shipwreck	Sydney Harbour, New South Wales	19	13 Feb 1938	Capsize of launch Rodney
Shipwreck	Port Willunga, South Australia	18	13 Jul 1888	Star of Greece was driven aground in a storm 200 yards from the beach at Port Willunga, ten survivors
Air accident	Dandenong Ranges, Victoria	18	25 Oct 1938	1938 Kyeema crash
Air accident	Perth Airport, Western Australia	18	2 Jul 1949	1949 MacRobertson Miller Aviation DC-3 crash – aircraft crashed a minute after take-off, killing all 18 people on board
Road accident	Tumut Pond Dam, New South Wales	18	1 Sep 1973	Brake failure caused bus to plummet into reservoir
Air accident	Townsville, Queensland	18	12 Jun 1996	Two Army Blackhawk helicopters collided
Landslide	Thredbo, New South Wales	18	30 Jul 1997	1997 Thredbo landslide
Rail accident	Brooklyn, New South Wales	17	20 Jan 1944	A mail train ploughed into a bus at Brooklyn Railway Station
Rail accident	Wasleys Crossing, near Gawler, South Australia	17	12 Apr 1970	Wasleys Crossing (Gawler) disaster. Bus collided with a passenger train
Explosion	Ipswich, Queensland	17	31 Jul 1972	Mine gas explosion in the Box Flat Colliery
Heat wave	South-eastern regions	17	1 Feb 1993 – 10	Possibility of additional unreported deaths
Shipwreck	Bass Strait, Victoria	16	29 Nov 1934	SS Coramba left Warrnambool for Melbourne and was never seen again. Believed lost during storm
Rail accident	Camp Mountain, Queensland	16	5 May 1947	Camp Mountain train disaster. A crowded picnic train derailed on bend
Fire	Sylvania Heights, New South Wales	16	29 Apr 1981	Pacific Nursing Home fire
Massacre	Bondi Beach, New South Wales	16	14 Dec 2025	2025 Bondi Beach shooting
Boating accident	Territory of Papua and New Guinea (Note: Now located in the Papua-New Guinea, back then it was part of Australia.)	15+	15 July 1959	The Muniara, owned by Steamships Trading Company, capsized after repeated requests for repairs had been ignored and overloading of timber had been reported, killing 14 crew and an unknown number of passengers.
Boating accident	Mornington Peninsula, Victoria	15	21 May 1892	15 members of Mornington football team returning from match in Mordialloc in small fishing vessel Process were lost when their boat sank in bad weather. Only 4 bodies were recovered
Shipwreck	Near Cape Schanck, Victoria	15	28 Dec 1893	SS Alert
Boat accident	Sydney Harbour	15	1909 Jan	HMS Encounter v Dunmore
Bombings	Kalgoorlie	15	1 Feb 1942	Pero Raecivich threw gelinite into a house and a hotel
Air accident	Botany Bay, New South Wales	15	30 Nov 1961	Ansett-ANA Flight 325 – Vickers Viscount aeroplane crash. All on board died
Fire	Fortitude Valley, Queensland	15	8 Mar 1973	Whiskey Au Go Go fire, caused by arson
Fire	Kings Cross, New South Wales	15	25 Dec 1975	Savoy Hotel fire caused by arson
Cyclone/sinking	Near Carnarvon, Western Australia	15	1979	Cyclone Hazel
Heat wave	South-eastern region	15	1981 Feb	
Fire	Childers, Queensland	15	2000 Jun	Childers Palace Backpackers Hostel fire, caused by arson
Air accident	Lockhart River, Queensland	15	7 May 2005	In the Lockhart River air disaster an aeroplane crashed on approach to land, killing all on board
Cyclone	Townsville and Charters Towers, Queensland	14	9 Mar 1903	Cyclone Leonta killed 12 people in Townsville and 2 in Charters Towers and caused massive property damage across North Queensland
Bushfire	Dandenong Ranges and Lara, Victoria	14*	14–16 Jan 1962	Casualty numbers vary between 9,14, and 32
Bushfires	Sydney, Blue Mountains and Illawarra, New South Wales	14*	1968 Jan	*Sources vary on death toll but most say 14
Cyclone	Whitsunday Islands, Queensland	14	17–18 Jan 1970	Tropical Cyclone Ada passed over the Whitsunday Islands from late 17th to early 18 January, crossing the Queensland coastline around Shute Harbour early that morning. 14 people perished in the cyclone
Cyclone	Brisbane, Queensland	14	27 Jan 1974	1974 Brisbane flood. Cyclone Wanda
Explosion	Appin, New South Wales	14	24 Jul 1979	Appin Colliery Gas Explosion during a planned ventilation change
Cyclone/flood	Queensland and New South Wales	14	27 Mar 2017 – 1 Apr 2017	Cyclone Debbie causes severe flooding throughout Queensland and New South Wales, with resultant severe damage
Explosion	Wonthaggi, Victoria	13	15 Feb 1937	Dalyson Colliery
Boating accident	Grafton, New South Wales	13	11 Dec 1943	13 Cub scouts drowned crossing the Clarence River when their punt capsized.
Air accident	Nundle, New South Wales	13	1948 Sep	DC3 Lutana near Tamworth
Explosion	Kianga, near Moura, Queensland	13	20 Sep 1975	Kianga Mine explosion
Air accident	Sydney Airport, New South Wales	13	21 Feb 1980	Light aircraft suffers engine failure
Air accident	Near Alice Springs, Northern Territory	13	13 Aug 1989	1989 Alice Springs hot air balloon crash
Earthquake	Newcastle, New South Wales	13	28 Dec 1989	1989 Newcastle earthquake
Bushfire	Portland, Plenty Ranges, Westernport; Wimmera and Dandenong districts, Victoria	12*	6 Feb 1851	"Black Thursday" bushfires. *Approximately 12 fatalities, one million sheep, thousands of cattle, 50,000 square kilometres (12,000,000 acres; 5,000,000 ha) burnt
Boating accident	Hawkesbury River, New South Wales	12	18 Oct 1936	Wedding party boat foundered during wind squall
Flood	Windsor, New South Wales	12	21 Jun 1867	The Eather family swept away in flood
Shipwreck	Calgardup Bay, Western Australia	12	1 Dec 1876	SS Georgette
Shipwreck	Wollongong, New South Wales	12	22 Feb 1949	SS Bombo
Bushfire	Gippsland, Victoria	12	1 Feb 1898	"Red Tuesday" bushfires. 2,600 square kilometres (640,000 acres) burnt, 12 people killed, 2,000 buildings destroyed
Bridge collapse	Hobart, Tasmania	12	5 Jan 1975	Tasman Bridge disaster. The bulk ore carrier Lake Illawarra collided with the bridge, causing a section to fall onto the vessel. Seven crewmen died as the ship sank. Five people perished as their cars plummeted off the edge.
Air accident	Adavale, Queensland	12	28 Aug 1983	A charter flight from Windorah to Toowoomba broke up in flight and crashed on the evening of 28 August 1983, near Adavale
Explosion	Moura, Queensland	12	16 Jul 1986	Explosion in Moura No 4 Mine
Fire	Dungog, New South Wales	12	2 Aug 1991	Palm Grove Hostel fire
Serial killing	Snowtown, South Australia	12	1992–1999	Snowtown murders
Road accident	Boondall, Queensland	12	24 Oct 1994	Boondall bus crash
Shipwreck	Fraser Island, Queensland	11	19 Mar 1864	The Panama was driven onto sand on the western coast of Fraser Island, near Sandy Cape during a cyclone early on 19 March. The death toll was 11 or 12 (sources vary)
Rail accident	Near Horsham, Victoria	11	24 Feb 1951	A train collides with a bus at a level crossing
Road accident	Near Laverton, Western Australia	11	16 Dec 1985	Eight indigenous men and three indigenous women aged between 16 and 40 died when their station wagon collided with a sedan near Laverton, WA.
Air accident	Cairns, Queensland	11	23 Oct 1975	A de Havilland Heron DH114 aircraft crash landed near Cairns Airport on the night of 23 October, killing all eleven occupants
Air accident	Mount Emerald, Queensland	11	11 May 1990	Cessna 500 jet aircraft collided with terrain 15 kilometres (9.3 mi) south of Mareeba Airfield
Road accident	Tamborine Mountain, Queensland	11	25 Sep 1990	Bus carrying mostly senior citizens from Newcastle, New South Wales overturned and rolled down mountain slope
Explosion	Moura, Queensland	11	7 Aug 1994	Explosion in Moura No 2 Mine
Rail accident	Near Kerang, Victoria	11	5 Jun 2007	Kerang train crash. A V/Line train collides with a truck at a level crossing
Fire	Slacks Creek, Queensland	11	24 Aug 2011	House fire
Fire	Quakers Hill, New South Wales	11*	18 Nov 2011	Quakers Hill Nursing Home fire. As of 9 January 2012, NSW health officials claimed a total of 21 out of 96 residents died but police could only conclusively prove 11 perished directly as a result of the fire.
Shipwreck	Warrnambool, Victoria	10	9 Jan 1921	Motorlaunch Nestor sinks in the Hopkins River, ten minutes into a pleasure cruise. Of the eighty on board ten were drowned. Victoria's worst ferry disaster
Rail accident	Near Traveston railway station, Queensland	10	9 Jun 1925	10 died and 48 injured when a passenger carriage and luggage van of the Rockhampton Mail plunged off a high trestle bridge
Rail accident	Near Boronia, Victoria	10	26 Apr 1926	A train collides with a van at a level crossing
Air accident	Canberra, Australian Capital Territory	10	13 Aug 1940	Senior War Cabinet Ministers, Chief of Staff, and others killed when their plane crashed in fine weather
Air accident	Near Redesdale, Victoria	10	31 Jan 1945	Crash of Stinson Tokana caused by fatigue crack in wing spar
Massacre	South Australia	10	6 Sep 1971	Clifford Bartholomew kills ten members of his family
Road accident	Merredin, Western Australia	10	18 Sep 1982	Ten people died (one adult, nine children) and 8 injured (four seriously) returning from a football trip to Perth when their bus crashed into a tree.
Air accident	Near Leonora, Western Australia	10	16 Dec 1988	Mitsubishi MU-2 accident
Road accident	Wangaratta, Victoria	10	2 Nov 1993	Crash between a semi-trailer truck and a bus on Melbourne Cup Day 1993. Ten members of the Anglo-Indian Association died when their bus heading to Corowa for a Melbourne Cup outing collided with a car-carrier semi trailer
Heat wave	Eastern and southern regions	10+	1–2 Jan 1997	Strong likelihood of additional unreported deaths
Storm/flood	Hunter and Central Coast regions, New South Wales	10	8–11 Jun 2007	Storm and flooding
Road accident	Greta, New South Wales	10	11 Jun 2023	Hunter Valley bus crash

== Gallery ==
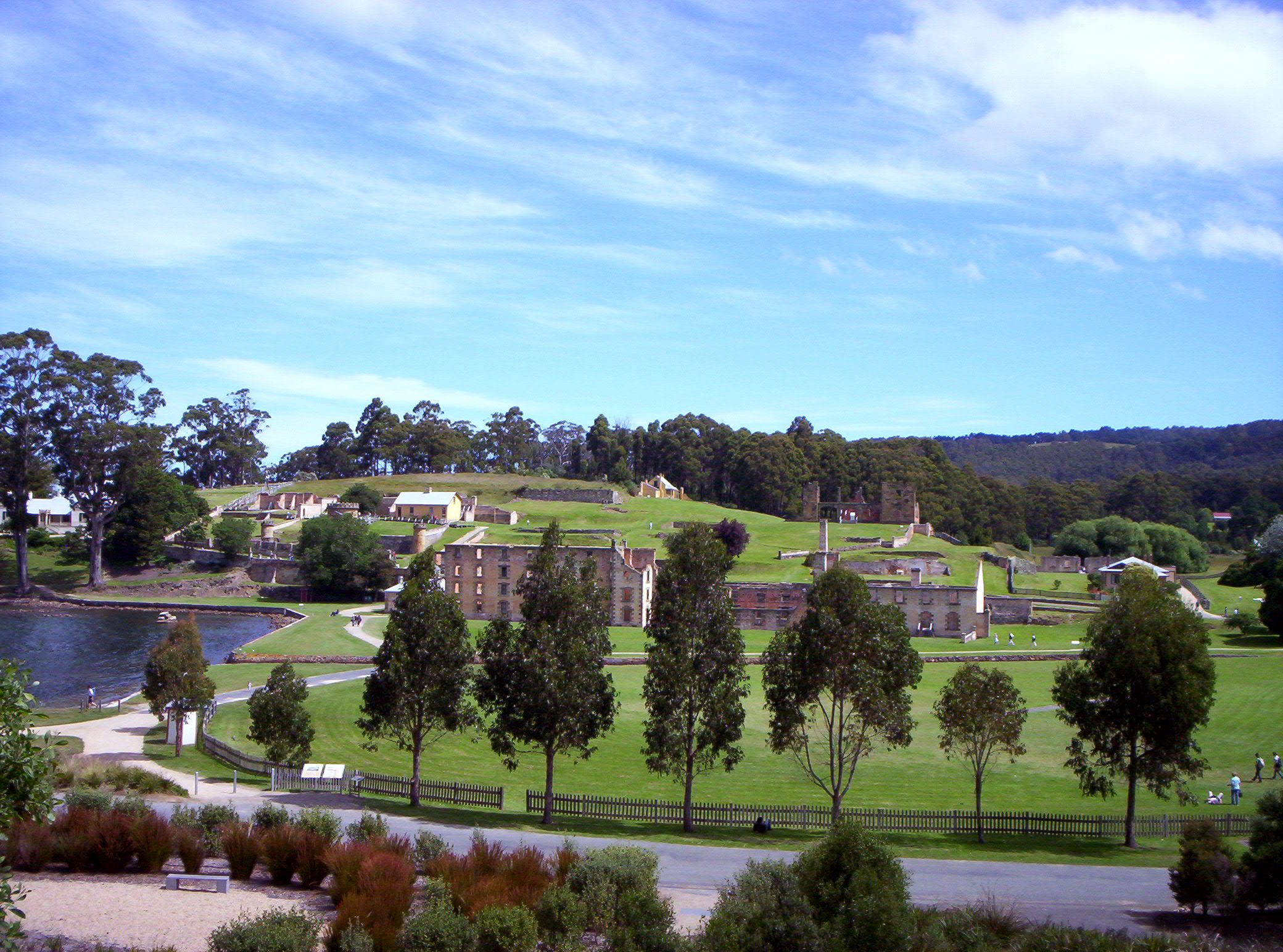
The Port Arthur massacre claimed 35 lives in 1996 when Martin Bryant opened fire in the former penal colony.

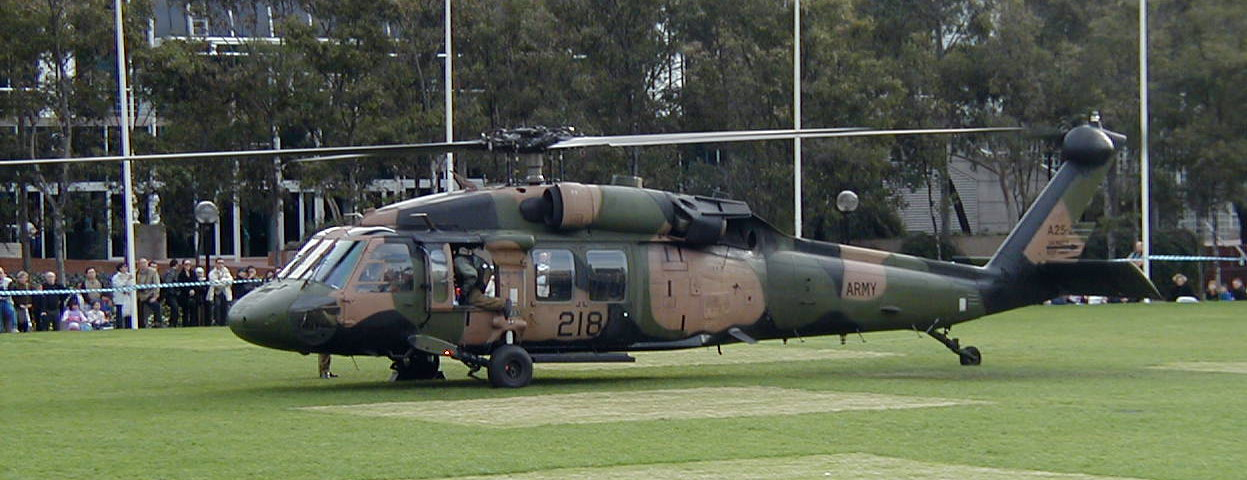
Two Australian Army S-70A Blackhawk helicopters, similar to the one pictured, crashed in 1996 near Townsville, killing 18 Australian soldiers.

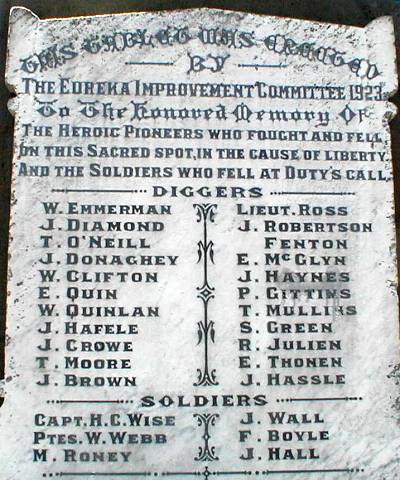
A memorial stone to some of those who died during the Eureka Stockade in 1854.

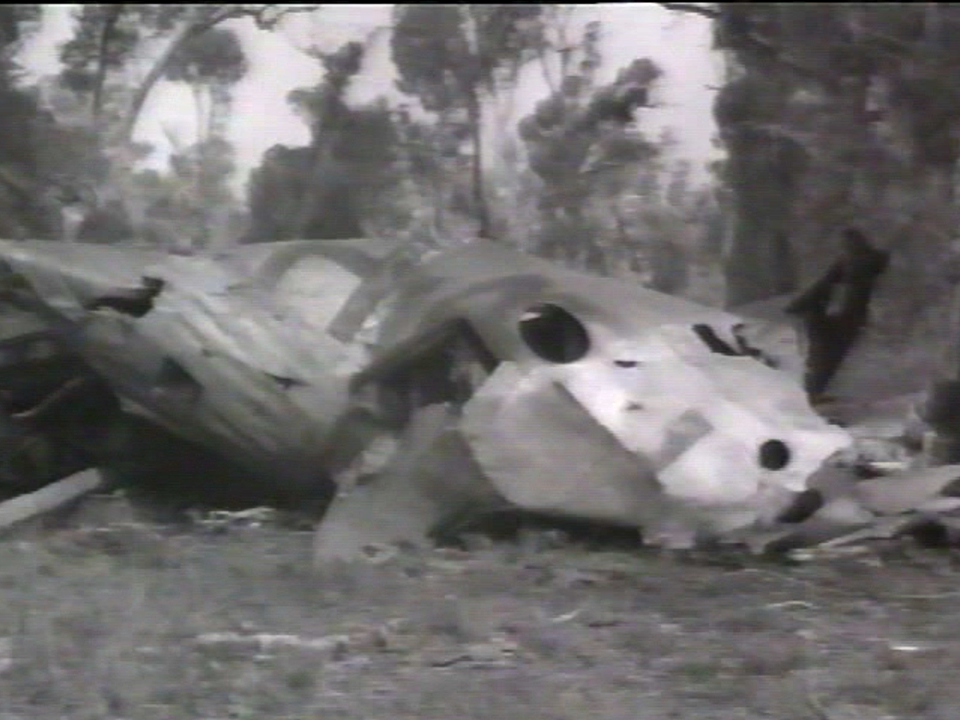
The 1950 Australian National Airways Douglas DC-4 crash claimed 29 lives.

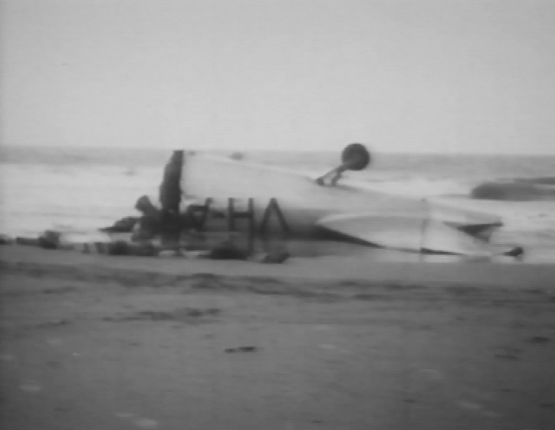
The 1946 Australian National Airways DC-3 crash claimed 25 lives.

== Significant incidents resulting in fewer than 10 deaths ==
Disaster	Location	Deaths	Date	Notes
Rail accident	Richmond railway station, Melbourne	9	1 Jul 1910	Brighton train collided with stationary train at platform.
Bushfire	Gippsland, Victoria	9	4 Feb 1932	Locations affected included Gilderoy, Noojee and Erica in North Gippsland. Worst incident was at Erica where six people were killed.
Rail accident	Boronia, Victoria	9	1 Jun 1951	Bus collided with suburban train.
Bushfire	Longwood, Victoria	9	17–19 Jan 1965	Death toll included seven members of one family who were lost when their car crashed and was engulfed in the fires.
Rail accident	Violet Town, Victoria	9	7 Feb 1969	Violet Town rail accident. Head-on collision after driver died at controls.
Fire	Kings Cross, New South Wales	9	1981 Aug	Rembrandt Apartments Hostel Fire. Fire.
Massacre	Melbourne, Victoria	9	8 Dec 1987	Queen Street massacre. Shooting massacre
Air accident	Newcastle–Lord Howe Island	9	2 Oct 1994	Seaview Air Aero Commander 690 crashes between Williamtown, NSW and Lord Howe Island.
Fire	Kew, Victoria	9	8 Apr 1996	Kew Cottages fire. Fire at a Melbourne home for disabled people kills nine men. Coronial inquest in 1997 finds there was no proper fire safety system in place at the time of the fire.
Landslide	Gracetown, Western Australia	9	27 Sep 1996	5 adults and 4 children died when a cliff face collapsed at Cowaramup Bay near Gracetown (Margaret River)
Bushfire	Eyre Peninsula, South Australia	9	11 Jan 2005	Eyre Peninsula bushfire.
Storm	Melbourne, Victoria	9	21 Nov 2016	Nine people died of thunderstorm asthma and approximately 8,500 sought hospital treatment after a storm hit Melbourne.
Insurrection	Norfolk Island	8	15 Jan 1834	Convict mutiny. Six convicts and two guards killed. 11 convicts were later executed.
Civil unrest	Broome, Western Australia	8	23–26 Dec 1920	Broome Race Riots. Brawling and rioting between Japanese and Koepanger (Malay & Timorese) pearl divers.
Air accident	Snowy Mountains, New South Wales	8	21 Mar 1931	Southern Cloud
Air accident	Jervis Bay, New South Wales	8	14 Apr 1943	Two RAAF Bristol Beauforts collided whilst performing demonstration flight for war correspondents on board a naval vessel.
Bushfire	Wandilo, South Australia	8	1958 Apr	8 firefighters died
Air accident	Golden Grove, South Australia	8	13 Jul 1972	Piper PA-31-310 Navajo plane crash
Explosion	Sandy Bay, Tasmania	8	5 Sep 1974	8 died when newly installed boiler at Mt. St. Canice laundry breached after "gags" were not removed from safety valves and boiler was subsequently fired until it exploded whilst commissioning.
Bushfire	Western Victoria	8	1977 Feb	Around Streatham was the worst affected area.
Road accident	Near Gordonvale, Queensland	8	4 Feb 1987	Bus returning from school camp veered off-road. All of those lost were students of Cairns State High School aged 15–17. 12 more people were seriously injured. Subsequent inquests ruled that faulty brakes on the vehicle were the cause of the accident.
Cyclone	Onslow & Carnarvon, Western Australia	8	24–26 Feb 1995	Cyclone Bobby. Seven of the deaths occurred when two fishing trawlers sank near Onslow.
Air accident	Off Whyalla, South Australia	8	31 May 2000	Whyalla Airlines Disaster. All on board drowned, one body was never recovered.
Explosion	Off Dampier, Western Australia	8	18 Nov 2001	Nigo Kim cargo ship explosion.
Massacre	Manoora, Cairns, Queensland	8	19 Dec 2014	Cairns child killings. Eight children were fatally stabbed in a Murray Street residence.
Serial killing	Near Berrima, New South Wales	7+	1989–1994	Backpacker murders. The remains of seven backpackers found in the Belanglo State Forest; the killer remains the prime suspect for another 16 unsolved murders and is a person of interest for another 14. There is evidence he may not have acted alone.
Rail accident	Cootamundra, New South Wales	7	25 Jan 1885	Derailment when Salt Clay Creek flooded, destroying culvert
Mine disaster	Collinsville, Queensland	7	13 Oct 1954	On 13 October 1954, seven men were killed in the deepest part of the Collinsville State Coal Mine about 1.5 kilometres from the entrance of the No. 1 tunnel, when an outburst dislodged 900 tonnes of earth. The Collinsville mine disaster was the largest loss of life in a Queensland mine since the Mount Mulligan mine disaster in 1921.
Boating accident	Wilson Inlet, Western Australia	7	5 Nov 1911	Seven members of the same family drowned when a small yacht Little Wonder was hit by a squall.
Boating accident	Lake Hume, New South Wales	7	15 Aug 1963	Canoeists on Outward Bound outdoor education trip drowned when their canoes capsized in rough weather and in cold waters.
Flood	Canberra	7	26 Jan 1971	1971 Canberra flood. Seven motorists were killed when their cars were swept into a creek.
Air accident	Near Alice Springs, Northern Territory	7	20 Jan 1972	Beechcraft 65-80 Queen Air accident.
Serial killing	Near Truro, South Australia	7	1976–1977	Truro murders. Remains of seven young women found in bushland.
Fire	Milsons Point, New South Wales	7	9 Jun 1979	Fire engulfs the Ghost Train ride at Luna Park Sydney. May have been arson.
Air accident	Near Charleville, Queensland	7	19 Sep 1981	Cessna U206 accident.
Massacre	Milperra, New South Wales	7	2 Sep 1984	Milperra massacre. Shooting massacre
Massacre	Clifton Hill, Victoria	7	9 Aug 1987	Hoddle Street massacre. Shooting massacre
Flood	Queensland, New South Wales and Victoria	7	1990	Nyngan and Charleville Flood. More than a million square kilometres of flooding.
Air accident	South Stradbroke Island, Queensland	7	3 Mar 1991	Sea World helicopter accident.
Massacre	Strathfield, New South Wales	7	17 Aug 1991	Strathfield massacre. Shooting massacre
Massacre	Terrigal, New South Wales	7	27 Oct 1992	Central Coast massacre. Shooting massacre
Air accident	Young, New South Wales	7	11 Jun 1993	Piper PA-31-350 Chieftain plane crash.
Massacre	Hillcrest, Queensland	7	25 Jan 1996	Peter May killed his estranged wife, three children and parents-in-law before committing suicide.
Cyclone	Around Cairns, Queensland	7	1997 Mar	Cyclone Justin. 1 death from landslide. There were also 26 deaths from the same cyclone in Papua New Guinea.
Rail accident	Glenbrook, New South Wales	7	1999 Dec	Glenbrook train disaster. Collision by a CityRail Intercity train into the rear wagon of an Indian Pacific train after "Stop and Proceed".
Heat wave	Around Adelaide, South Australia	7	2000 Feb	
Rail accident	Waterfall, New South Wales	7	2003 Jan	Waterfall rail accident. Excessive speed resulting in derailment after driver died at the controls and 'dead man' safety device failed to function.
Massacre	Osmington, Western Australia	7	11 May 2018	Osmington shooting. Three adults and four children were shot dead in an alleged murder-suicide on a rural property.
Massacre	Bondi Junction, New South Wales	7	13 Apr 2024	2024 Westfield Bondi Junction stabbings. A mass stabbing resulted in the deaths of six people before the assailant was shot dead by police.
Industrial accident	Spotswood, Victoria	6	1895	Spotswood Sewer Disaster. The drilling of an underground sewer in Melbourne went too close to the Yarra River.
Massacre	Alligator Creek near Mackay, Queensland	6	17 Nov 1911	A mother and five children were murdered in their home.
Battle	Broken Hill, New South Wales	6	1 Jan 1915	Battle of Broken Hill. Two Indian immigrants open fire on a train carrying picnickers.
Landslide	Between Blackwood, South Australia and Belair, South Australia	6	31 Jan 1928	Hills Railway line disaster. A railway embankment collapsed during tunnel demolition, entombing 6 railway workers.
Air Accident	Near Port Pirie, South Australia	6	27 Aug 1943	Two RAAF Fairey Battle aircraft on a training flight collided in mid-air.
Air Raid	Drysdale Mission, Northern Territory	6	26 Sep 1943	Missionary Priest & five Aboriginal children killed in Japanese bombing raid on RAAF aerodrome located beside the Mission.
Flood	Kempsey, Macleay Valley	6	26–27 Aug 1949	Six people died in the flood, five in Kempsey. The Kempsey Traffic Bridge reached a peak height of 8.42m on the afternoon of 27 August.
Air accident	East Sale, Victoria	6	15 Aug 1962	Four RAAF Vampire jets crashed in a military gunnery range area during rehearsals for a low-level aerobatic display. Four pilots and two passengers killed.
Air accident	18 km south of Wilkurra Homestead, New South Wales	6	2 Apr 1974	Cessna 310H accident.
Air accident	Near Merimbula, New South Wales	6	29 Feb 1976	Piper PA-32 accident.
Air accident	Near Kingscote Airport, Kangaroo Island, South Australia	6	15 May 1977	Cessna 210K accident.
Flood	Sydney and Penrith, New South Wales	6	1978 Feb–Mar	
Air accident	Norseman Airport, Norseman, Western Australia	6	11 Jun 1978	Beechcraft D-55 Baron accident.
Air accident	Essendon, Victoria	6	10 Jul 1978	Aircraft with a crew of two and one passenger crashed into houses shortly after takeoff from Essendon Airport. 6 members of one family were killed.
Air accident	Near Shepparton, Victoria	6	30 Aug 1979	Cessna P206C accident.
Serial killing	Tynong North and Frankston, Victoria	6	1980 Dec	Remains found in bushland. Investigation still open.
Air accident	Koolan Island, Western Australia	6	23 Dec 1984	Cessna 210L accident.
Air accident	Near Bankstown Airport, New South Wales	6	7 Jun 1985	Cessna 210N accident.
Flood	Hawkesbury, New South Wales	6	1986 Aug	Hawkesbury and Georges River Flood.
Air accident	Essendon, Victoria	6	3 Sep 1986	Air Ambulance Cessna (call signal RED) crashed on takeoff from Essendon Airport after single engine failure.
Massacre	Canley Vale, New South Wales	6	10 Oct 1987	John Tran killed five members of the Huynh family before committing suicide.
Fire	Kings Cross, New South Wales	6	17 Sep 1989	Downunder Hostel fire. Arson attack.
Flood/cyclone	Southern Queensland and northern New South Wales	6	3–7 Feb 1990	Tropical Cyclone Nancy crossed the coast near Byron Bay, then moving back out to sea. It brought extremely heavy rain which led to flash flooding, with 6 lives lost to drowning.
Rail accident	Brooklyn, New South Wales	6	6 May 1990	Commuter train crashed into a stalled chartered steam train.
Air accident	Tarago, New South Wales	6	19 Jun 1992	Beechcraft Baron accident.
Air accident	Geraldton, Western Australia	6	25 Aug 1992	Beechcraft Baron accident.
Air accident	Launceston, Tasmania	6	17 Sep 1993	A Piper PA-31-350 Chieftain collided with powerlines and crashed near Launceston Airport, killing six of the ten people on board.
Air accident	Weipa Airport, Weipa, Queensland	6	21 Mar 1994	Britten-Norman BN-2A-21 Islander accident.
Maritime accident	Tasman Sea	6	1998	1998 Sydney to Hobart Yacht Race. 5 boats sank and 6 people died.
Air accident	Hamilton Island, Queensland	6	27 Sep 2002	Piper Cherokee Six aircraft crashed shortly after take-off. All six occupants, five of which were foreign nationals, perished.
Road crash	Cardross, near Mildura, Victoria	6	18 Feb 2006	Cardross road crash. Car ploughs into group of teenagers, driver flees.
Sinking	Sydney Harbour, New South Wales	6	1 May 2008	6 killed and 9 injured when two boats collided.
Road accident	Penshurst, Victoria	6	11 Nov 2011	A car and truck collided and subsequently caught fire at an intersection near Penshurst. Four occupants of the car died at the scene, along with the truck driver, and a fifth occupant of the car died later in hospital.
Air accident	Near Gympie, Queensland	6	1 Oct 2012	De Havilland DH84 Dragon crashed in dense bushland, killing all six on board.
Flood	Tasmania, ACT & New South Wales	6	5–8 Jun 2016	Three deaths occurred in Tasmania at Latrobe, Ouse and Evandale. One death occurred at Cotter Dam in the ACT. Two deaths occurred in NSW, one near Bowral, the other in Leppington.
Vehicle attack	Melbourne, Victoria	6	20 Jan 2017	January 2017 Melbourne car attack
Sinking	Near 1770, Queensland	6	16 Oct 2017	Sinking of the FV Dianne
Air accident	Cottage Point, New South Wales	6	31 Dec 2017	2017 Sydney Seaplanes crash. A de Havilland Canada DHC-2 Beaver seaplane crashed in Jerusalem Bay, killing all 6 people on board including Richard Cousins, CEO of British foodservice company, Compass Group.
Recreation accident	Devonport, Tasmania	6	16 Dec 2021	An inflatable castle that was being used for a year-end celebration at Hillcrest Primary School became airborne, resulting in the deaths of six students. A further three students were seriously injured.
Police siege	Glenrowan, Victoria	5	28 Jun 1880	Planned ambush of police train by outlaw Ned Kelly and his gang was thwarted and instead became a hostage situation at Glenrowan hotel. Three gang members and two hostages were killed.
Sinking	North of Bermagui, New South Wales	5	9 Oct 1880	Mystery Bay disappearance. Crew of 5 men in a small boat disappears off the NSW south coast. Boat found at Mutton Fish Point (now Mystery Bay) with some of the crews belongings.
Landslide	Cairns, Queensland	5	31 May 1900	Riverstone landslide. A tramway cutting caves in on workers, at Gordonvale.
Storm	Sydney, New South Wales	5	25 Jan 1937	A tornadic thunderstorm moved through Sydney on the afternoon of 25 January. Five people died.
Air accident	Lamington National Park, New South Wales	5	19–20 Feb 1937	Crash of Australian National Airways Stinson Model A VH-UHH Brisbane. Four men died in initial crash, fifth man killed in accidental fall the following day whilst trying to reach help. Two survivors rescued nine days later.
Drowning	Bondi Beach, Sydney, New South Wales	5	6 Feb 1938	'Black Sunday'- Approximately 200 swimmers were dragged out by severe undertow caused by three freak waves. Surf Lifesavers were credited with saving at least 180 people.
Air accident	Nhill, Victoria	5	13 May 1943	Avro Anson During a training mission from Mt Gambier to Nhill crashed in fog just 8 miles north east of Nhill.
Rail accident	Sydenham, New South Wales	5	1953	Sydenham rail disaster. Wrong-side failure causes rear-end collision of two trains
Air accident	Near Gove Airport, East Arnhem Region, Northern Territory	5	22 Dec 1969	Cessna 402 accident.
Air accident	Moorabbin, Victoria	5	19 Oct 1970	Airborne collision between a Beechcraft D-50 Twin Bonanza and a Bell 47G helicopter.
Air accident	Parafield Airport, Parafield, South Australia	5	3 Mar 1975	Beechcraft D-55 Baron accident.
Air accident	Fitzroy Station, Northern Territory	5	13 Mar 1975	A Cessna 310N collided with a radio mast and subsequently crashed.
Air accident	Parafield Airport, Parafield, South Australia	5	1 Feb 1976	Airborne collision between a Rossair Cessna 172M and a Piper PA-28 Cherokee.
Air accident	Near Cloncurry, Queensland	5	11 Jun 1976	Cessna 210 accident.
Suicide air attack	Alice Springs Airport, Alice Springs, Northern Territory	5	5 Jan 1977	Connellan air disaster A disgruntled ex-employee deliberately flew light aircraft into Connellan Airways building. Roger Connellan, son of the company's founder, was among those killed.
Air accident	Mount Cataract, Queensland	5	26 May 1977	Cessna 310R accident.
Air accident	Near Moorooduc, Victoria	5	28 Sep 1980	Airborne collision between a Cessna 172N and a glider.
Presumed air accident	Barrington Tops National Park, New South Wales	5	9 Aug 1981	VH-MDX disappeared
Air accident	Archerfield, Queensland	5	5 Jan 1982	A Cessna 411A crashed into an annex, killing the pilot and four people on the ground.
Air accident	Near Lang Lang, Victoria	5	7 Jan 1982	Bell 206B accident.
Air accident	Near Cairns, Queensland	5	30 Sep 1982	Cessna 210 accident.
Massacre	Inland Motel at the base of Uluru, Northern Territory	5	18 Aug 1983	Douglas Crabbe rammed his 25-ton Mack truck through the wall of the motel's bar.
Massacre	Wahroonga, New South Wales	5	1984 Apr	John Brandon murdered his wife, three children and mother before committing suicide.
Air accident	33 km West of Peterborough, South Australia	5	22 Oct 1985	Piper PA-32 accident.
Air accident	Chipping Norton, New South Wales	5	17 Aug 1986	A Piper PA-32 crashed into the roof of a factory, killing five of the six occupants on board.
Riot	Pentridge Prison, Melbourne, Victoria	5	29 Oct 1987	Five prisoners die in fire in Jika Jika Maximum Security Wing. Fire was started by inmates as a protest.
Massacre	Near Gunbalanya, Northern Territory	5	25 Sep 1988	Dennis Rostron fatally shot five members of his family.
Air accident	Cravens Peak Station, Queensland	5	7 Apr 1989	Cessna 172 accident.
Air accident	Near Roma, Queensland	5	28 Sep 1989	Beechcraft Baron accident.
Heat wave	Southern South Australia and northern Victoria	5+	1990 Jan	Likelihood of additional unreported deaths.
Air accident	Wondai, Queensland	5	26 Jul 1990	Beechcraft King Air accident.
Massacre	Surry Hills, New South Wales	5	30 Aug 1990	Paul Anthony Evers fatally shot five people in a unit block.
Air accident	Off East Sale, Victoria	5	29 Oct 1991	1991 RAAF Boeing 707 crash.
Air accident	Moormbool West, Victoria	5	12 Jun 1992	Piper PA-32R accident.
Siege	Cangai, New South Wales	5	1993 Mar	1993 Cangai siege
Heat wave	Townsville region	5	1994 Jan	
Flood	Southern Queensland and Northern New South Wales	5	1996 May	Heavy flooding in Southern Queensland and Northern New South Wales, with areas west of Brisbane and the Grafton area worst affected.
Massacre	Richmond, Tasmania	5	28 Jul 1997	Peter Shoobridge murdered his four daughters before taking his own life.
Air accident	Near Katherine, Northern Territory	5	14 Aug 1997	Cessna 210M accident.
Bushfire	Linton, Victoria	5	1998	Linton bushfire. Wildfire engulfs five volunteer firefighters.
Air accident	Marlborough, Queensland	5	24 Jul 2000	Five people were killed when the Capricorn Helicopter Rescue Service helicopter crashed in a paddock while attempting to land in thick fog
Air accident	Willowbank, Queensland	5	2 Jan 2006	Skydiving Cessna 206 plane crash.
Massacre	North Epping, New South Wales	5	18 Jul 2009	Lin family murders
Air accident	Caboolture Airfield, Caboolture, Queensland	5	22 Mar 2014	Skydiving Cessna 206 plane crash.
Massacre	Lockhart, New South Wales	5	2014 Sep	Geoff Hunt fatally shot his wife and three children on the family property before committing suicide in a dam.
Flood	Caboolture, Queensland	5	2 May 2015	Cars were swept off roads by floodwaters in Caboolture.
Air accident	Essendon, Victoria	5	21 Feb 2017	2017 Essendon Airport Beechcraft King Air crash
Massacre	Bedford, Western Australia	5	9 Sep 2018	Anthony Harvey killed his three daughters, wife and mother-in-law.
Air accident	Anna Bay, New South Wales	5	6 Sep 2019	Civil-owned Bell UH-1 Helicopter en route from Brisbane to Bankstown went missing off NSW coast.
Massacre	Camp Hill, Queensland	5	19 Feb 2020	Murder of Hannah Clarke. Former New Zealand Warriors player Rowan Baxter deliberately set fire to a vehicle in which his estranged wife and three children were occupants. Rowan and his three children died at the scene, whereas his wife was critically injured and died several hours later in hospital.
Air accident	Lockhart River, Queensland	5	11 Mar 2020	Cessna 404 Titan accident.
Air accident	Mount Disappointment, Victoria	5	31 Mar 2022	A helicopter operating on a private charter flight with another helicopter impacted terrain at Mount Disappointment.
Flood/cyclone	North and Central Coast, Queensland	4–5	1990 Dec & 1991 Jan	Extensive damage from flooding caused by Cyclone Joy
Heat wave	Melbourne, Victoria	4+	1990 Dec	Likelihood of additional unreported deaths
Insurrection	Norfolk Island	4	1 Jul 1846	Cooking pot uprising. One overseer and three constables murdered. 17 convicts were later executed, with many wounded in battle.
Drowning	Coogee Beach, Sydney, New South Wales	4	28 Jan 1911	Approximately 13 swimmers were dragged out to sea by the rip tide while regular surf lifesavers were at the lifesaving carnival at Manly. Harald Baker (brother of Snowy Baker) and James Clarken saved many lives.
Air accident	Lady Julia Percy Island, Victoria	4	15 Feb 1944	RAAF Avro Anson crashed on island near Western Victorian coast. Crew had become disorientated in darkness, mistaking island for the nearby mainland.
Sinking	Cairns, Queensland	4	13 Sep 1947	HMAS Warrnambool. Sunk while clearing minefields after World War II.
Landslide	Steavenson Falls, Victoria	4	9 Jan 1968	Four teenage bushwalkers killed when section of cliff broke away and rolled downhill to group's location. Three others survived with injuries.
Air accident	Burrendong Dam, New South Wales	4	31 Jul 1969	Cessna 182K accident.
Air accident	Yendon, Victoria	4	31 Oct 1970	Cessna 210A accident.
Air accident	Near Mount Buller, Victoria	4	29 May 1971	Cessna 172F accident.
Air accident	Near Wellington, New South Wales	4	31 May 1971	Beechcraft Bonanza accident.
Air accident	Near Narromine, New South Wales	4	14 Nov 1971	Piper PA-28 Cherokee accident.
Air accident	Moomba Adelaide Pipeline System, near Leigh Creek, South Australia	4	25 Jan 1972	Beechcraft Bonanza accident.
Air accident	Barkly Downs Homestead, Queensland	4	4 Jan 1974	Beechcraft Debonair accident.
Air accident	Bankstown Airport, Bankstown, New South Wales	4	13 Mar 1974	Airborne collision between a de Havilland DH.104 Dove and a Piper PA-30 Twin Comanche.
Air accident	Mount Dom Dom, Victoria	4	18 Jun 1974	Cessna 210H accident.
Air accident	Near Rankins Springs, New South Wales	4	30 Jul 1976	Cessna 182G accident.
Road accident	Lamington National Park, Queensland	4	21 Apr 1979	Brisbane Girls Grammar school bus crash.
Air accident	Clermont, Queensland	4	24 Oct 1983	Four Rockhampton-based ABC staff members were killed when the Cessna (being piloted by the ABC's regional manager) crashed while attempting to land on a property near Clermont.
Boating accident	Lake Alexandrina, South Australia	4	22 Aug 1987	Canoeists on Scout excursion lost when their canoes capsized in rough weather and in cold waters. Two scouts and two adult supervisors drowned.
Massacre	Greenough, Western Australia	4	21 Feb 1993	Greenough family massacre
Bushfire	Eastern Seaboard, New South Wales	4	1994 Jan	Over 800 bushfires. 4 of the dead were firefighters
Road/sport accident	Stuart Highway, Northern Territory	4	24 May 1994	2 checkpoint officials and 2 occupants killed when a competing car lost control at high-speed and ploughed into a checkpoint.
Fire	Indian Ocean	4	5 May 1998	HMAS Westralia. Unsuitable fuel hose in engine room bursts, spraying diesel which ignites, creating a fireball below deck.
Mining accident	Parkes, New South Wales	4	25 Nov 1999	A gust of air made its way along the access tunnel causing a truck to roll over two, while falling rocks killed the other pair.
Air accident	Newman, Western Australia	4	26 Jan 2001	Fuel starvation on Western Australia Police aircraft.
Landslide	Cradle Mountain National Park, Tasmania	4	18 Feb 2001	4 people died when landslide causes a bus to fall into a ravine
Air accident	Toowoomba, Queensland	4	27 Nov 2001	Plane hit powerlines
Rail accident	Salisbury Railway Station, Salisbury, South Australia	4	24 Oct 2002	The Ghan passenger train hit a car and a bus at a busy level crossing at Salisbury, in Adelaide's north.
Bushfire	Canberra	4	18 Jan 2003	2003 Canberra bushfires. Bushfire reaches capital city suburbs
Drowning	Mackenzie Falls, Grampians National Park, Victoria	4	25 Dec 2004	Four relatives lost on Christmas Day outing.
Sinking	Sydney Harbour, New South Wales	4	28 Mar 2007	HarbourCat ferry Pam Burridge collides with pleasure cruiser Merinda.
Flood	Sydney, Hunter Valley and Central Coast, New South Wales	4*	21–24 Apr 2015	Flood deaths occurred in Maitland and Dungog. *An additional four deaths occurred in NSW as a result of vehicle accidents on wet roads.
Bushfire	Esperance, Western Australia	4	17 Nov 2015	Three of the dead were foreign nationals.
Air accident	Barwon Heads, Victoria	4	29 Jan 2016	Light aircraft en route to King Island crashed into ocean near Victorian coast.
Amusement park accident	Coomera, Queensland	4	25 Oct 2016	Thunder River Rapids Ride accident at Dreamworld.
Massacre	Darwin, Northern Territory	4	4 Jun 2019	2019 Darwin shooting.
Road accident	Oatlands, New South Wales	4	1 Feb 2020	Four child pedestrians struck and killed by vehicle
Air accident	Mangalore, Victoria	4	19 Feb 2020	A midair collision between a Piper PA-44 Seminole and a Beechcraft D95A killed the two occupants of both aircraft.
Road accident	Kew East, Victoria	4	22 Apr 2020	2020 Eastern Freeway truck crash. The loss of control of a refrigerated truck resulted in a multiple vehicle crash that killed four Victoria Police officers who were attending to a motorist for speeding on the Eastern Freeway. The accident is the highest single loss of life in Victoria Police history.
Air accident	Deception Bay, near Rothwell, Queensland	4	19 Dec 2021	Rockwell Commander 114 accident.
Air accident	Gold Coast Seaway, near Main Beach, Queensland	4	2 Jan 2023	2023 Gold Coast helicopter crash. Midair collision involving two Sea World helicopters.
Air accident	Near Lindeman Island, Whitsunday Islands, Queensland	4	28 Jul 2023	Australian Army MRH90 helicopter crash during Exercise Talisman Sabre.
Air accident	Gundaroo, New South Wales	4	6 Oct 2023	Cirrus SR22 accident.
Drowning	Phillip Island, Victoria	4	24 Jan 2024	Three people drowned at an unpatrolled beach. A fourth person was taken to hospital in a critical condition where they died the following day.
Massacre	Lake Cargelligo, New South Wales	4	22 Jan 2026	2026 Lake Cargelligo shootings. The victims include three adults and one unborn child.
Massacre	Mosman Park, Western Australia	4	2026 Jan	Goasdoue Clune family murders.
Massacre	Stringybark Creek, near Tolmie, Victoria	3	26 Oct 1878	Three policemen murdered by outlaw Ned Kelly and his gang.
Civil unrest	Melbourne CBD, Victoria	3	2–4 Nov 1923	Victorian Police Strike. This event prompted widespread looting and rioting in central Melbourne.
Fire/explosion	Port Adelaide, South Australia	3	26 Apr 1924	Three firemen died after the SS City of Singapore, fully loaded with flammable cargo, caught fire and exploded. 10 other people were injured.
Air accident	Tambo, Queensland	3	24 Mar 1927	Qantas de Havilland DH-9C crash
Motorsport accident	Penrith, New South Wales	3	13 Jun 1938	During 10-mile car race at Penrith Speedway, the lead car lost control and swerved into spectators.
Serial killing	Melbourne	3	1942 May	Three Australian women were murdered in Melbourne between 3 and 18 May 1942 by US soldier Eddie Leonski who was convicted and executed in November that year.
Air accident	Maroochydore, Queensland	3	30 Dec 1950	A routine shark patrol during the Christmas holidays, crashed into a crowded beach killing 3 children and injuring 14 others.
Air accident	Near Sandy Hollow, New South Wales	3	26 Jan 1952	An Auster aircraft crashes four miles from Sandy Hollow, killing three.
Cyclone	Townsville, Queensland	3	1971 Dec	Cyclone Althea. Cyclone and storm surge.
Explosion	Near Taroom, Queensland	3	30 Aug 1972	Three people were killed when a burning truck carrying ammonium nitrate exploded on the Fitzroy Developmental Road at Stonecroft Station, north of Taroom.
Terrorism	Sydney	3	13 Feb 1978	Sydney Hilton bombing. Bomb explosion outside Sydney Hilton Hotel during the CHOGRM
Cyclone	south of Innisfail, Queensland	3	1986 Feb	Category 3 Cyclone Winifred in region from Cairns to Ingham.
Construction Accident	Brisbane, Queensland	3	4 Aug 1988	Concrete slab fell from crane at Commonwealth Bank building construction site, crushing pedestrians.
Drowning	Mount Field National Park, Tasmania	3	3 Jul 1990	School outdoor excursion. Two students and one teacher drowned whilst crossing creek.
Bushfire	Ferny Creek, Victoria	3	21 Jan 1997	3 dead in bushfire lit by arsonist.
Drowning	Sandbar Beach, Pacific Palms, New South Wales	3	15 Dec 1998	Young Christian group on beach trip, three drowned when caught in rip current.
Flood	Katherine, Northern Territory	3	1998 Jan	Flooding cause by ex-tropical Cyclone Les.
Severe storm	Hunter Valley, New South Wales, Sydney and central western regions	3	2001 Nov	
Air accident	Near Hamilton Island, Queensland	3	17 Oct 2003	CQ Rescue Bell 407 Helicopter on a medical retrieval flight crashed into sea en route to Hamilton Island.
Explosion	Near Gladstone, South Australia	3	9 May 2006	Three people killed and two injured when a massive explosion occurred at a munitions factory in the Mid North of South Australia. The blast radius was 100 metres and the explosion was heard up to 70 km away.
Road accident/fire	Melbourne	3	23 Mar 2007	Burnley Tunnel Fire. Traffic accident resulting in explosion and fire.
Bushfire	Boorabbin National Park, Western Australia	3	27 Dec 2007	Three men were killed and one man injured when a bushfire in the Boorabbin National Park rapidly changed direction while their trucks were attempting to pass the blaze.
Air accident	Lake Eyre, South Australia	3	19 Aug 2011	Three men, including journalist Paul Lockyer, were killed when an ABC helicopter crashed whilst filming a documentary on un-usual flooding occurring at Lake Eyre.
Wall Collapse	Melbourne, Victoria	3	28 Mar 2013	Three pedestrians killed when a brick wall collapsed in Swanston St in the CBD of Melbourne.
Terrorism	Sydney	3	15–16 Dec 2014	Lindt Cafe siege, also known as the 2014 Sydney hostage crisis: The hostage-taker and two hostages were killed.
Workplace accident	Oolong, New South Wales	3	16 Feb 2017	Three people died of carbon monoxide poisoning while cleaning the interior of a water tank on a rural property.
Fire	Footscray, Victoria	3	1 Mar 2017	Three homeless people died in a fire in a dis-used factory.
Air accident	Renmark, South Australia	3	30 May 2017	Three killed in light aircraft crash.
Air accident	Mission Beach, Queensland	3	13 Oct 2017	Three skydivers killed.
Flood	Townsville, Queensland	3*	4–8 Feb 2019	2019 Townsville flood *At least one additional death occurred after the floods due to flood-borne disease.
Storm	Victoria	3	27 Aug 2020	Winds reaching 158 km/h cause severe damage across Victoria, killing 3 people including a 4-year-old boy. Over 120,000 houses lost power and 101 suburbs were placed under a boil water advisory that was lifted 4 days later.
Air accident	Rottnest Island, Western Australia	3	7 Jan 2025	Cessna 208 Caravan accident.
Air accident	Shellharbour Airport, Albion Park Rail, New South Wales	3	11 Oct 2025	Piper PA-32R accident.
Air accident	Long Bay, Goolwa South, South Australia	3	6 Feb 2026	Cessna 210 Centurion accident.
Riot	Young, New South Wales	2*	30 Jun 1861	Lambing Flat riots. Over 3,000 European gold diggers attacked Chinese settlement on gold-fields. *Official death toll was two Chinese killed, but eyewitness accounts claimed that actual death toll possibly as high as 40.
Air accident	North Melbourne	2	4 Sep 1943	An RAAF Vultee Vengeance crashed near Macaulay railway station after giving aerial demonstration over Flemington Racecourse. Both crew on board were killed.
Air accident	Bluff Downs, Queensland	2	9 Apr 1984	Two RAAF Mirage fighter jets collided in mid-air.
Landslide	Coledale, New South Wales	2	30 Apr 1988	20-metre railway embankment collapsed after being undermined by blocked drains following heavy rainfall, destroying a house located below, killing both occupants.
Industrial explosion	Longford, Victoria	2	25 Sep 1998	a large explosion at an Esso operated oil and natural gas processing plant was responsible for an almost complete shutdown of Victoria's natural gas supply for weeks thereafter. At 12:25 pm 25 September 1998 the weld on GP905 cracked and the exchanger failed catastrophically instantly killing two people.
Road accident	Longwood exit, Hume Highway, Victoria	2	10 Dec 2001	A trio of students from Walla Walla, New South Wales, stole a car and planned to drive to Melbourne. The group were sighted by police near Benalla and were pursued. The vehicle reached speeds of 200 km/h before crashing into an embankment; Tristram Rich and Joshua French were killed, while Jason Spalding survived. In adulthood, Spalding is a senior information technology manager at Glenunga International High School.
Bushfire	Grampians, Victoria	2	22 Jan 2006	A father and son died in a bushfire in Victoria's west
Rail accident	Trawalla, Victoria	2	28 Apr 2006	2 people killed in level-crossing train accident at Trawalla, near Beaufort, Victoria
Electrocution	Rainbow, Victoria	2	16 Mar 2010	Father and son killed on their farm whilst moving a windmill which touched overhead power lines. Two other people badly injured.
Bushfire	Blue Mountains, New South Wales	2	17 Oct 2013	A 43-year-old father water-bomber pilot and a 63-year-old man
Avalanche	Mount Bogong, Victoria	2	10 Jul 2014	Two snowboarders buried in avalanche.
Workplace accident	Wetherill Park, New South Wales	2	23 Apr 2015	Two workers crushed by falling timber inside a shipping container at a truck body manufacturing centre.
Bushfire	Yarloop, Western Australia	2	8 Jan 2016	
Air accident	Wilton, New South Wales	2	15 Jul 2017	Two skydivers killed.
Air Accident	Leigh Creek, South Australia	2	6 Jul 2019	Light aircraft crash.
Riot	Brisbane, Queensland	1	26 Nov 1942–27	Battle of Brisbane. Street brawling and rioting between Australian and US military personnel. One Australian soldier was killed, over 20 Australian and US soldiers badly injured.
Gas Explosion	Cairns, Queensland	1	17 Aug 1987	40,000-litre LPG storage unit at Cairns gas works exploded, resulting in a BLEVE (Boiling Liquid Expanding Vapour Explosion). Australia's largest ever LPG explosion.
Building implosion	Canberra, ACT.	1	13 Jul 1997	Royal Canberra Hospital implosion. Spectator killed by falling debris.
Hailstorm	Sydney	1	14 Apr 1999	1999 Sydney hailstorm; most costly single natural disaster in Australia's history, with A$1.7 billion in insured damages and approximately A$2.3 billion total (1999 values).
Asphyxiation	Sydney, New South Wales	1	26 Jan 2001	Big Day Out Concert. Teenage girl crushed in mosh pit.
Cyclone	Queensland	1	20 Mar 2006	Severe Tropical Cyclone Larry
Mine disaster	Beaconsfield, Tasmania	1	25 Apr 2006	Beaconsfield Mine collapse
Flood	Mackay, Queensland	1	16 Feb 2008	Multiple storm cells resulted in flash flooding in the city of Mackay on 15 February 2008. The flooding caused millions of dollars of damage, with one person dying due to drowning.
Cyclone	Queensland	1	3 Feb 2011	Severe Tropical Cyclone Yasi

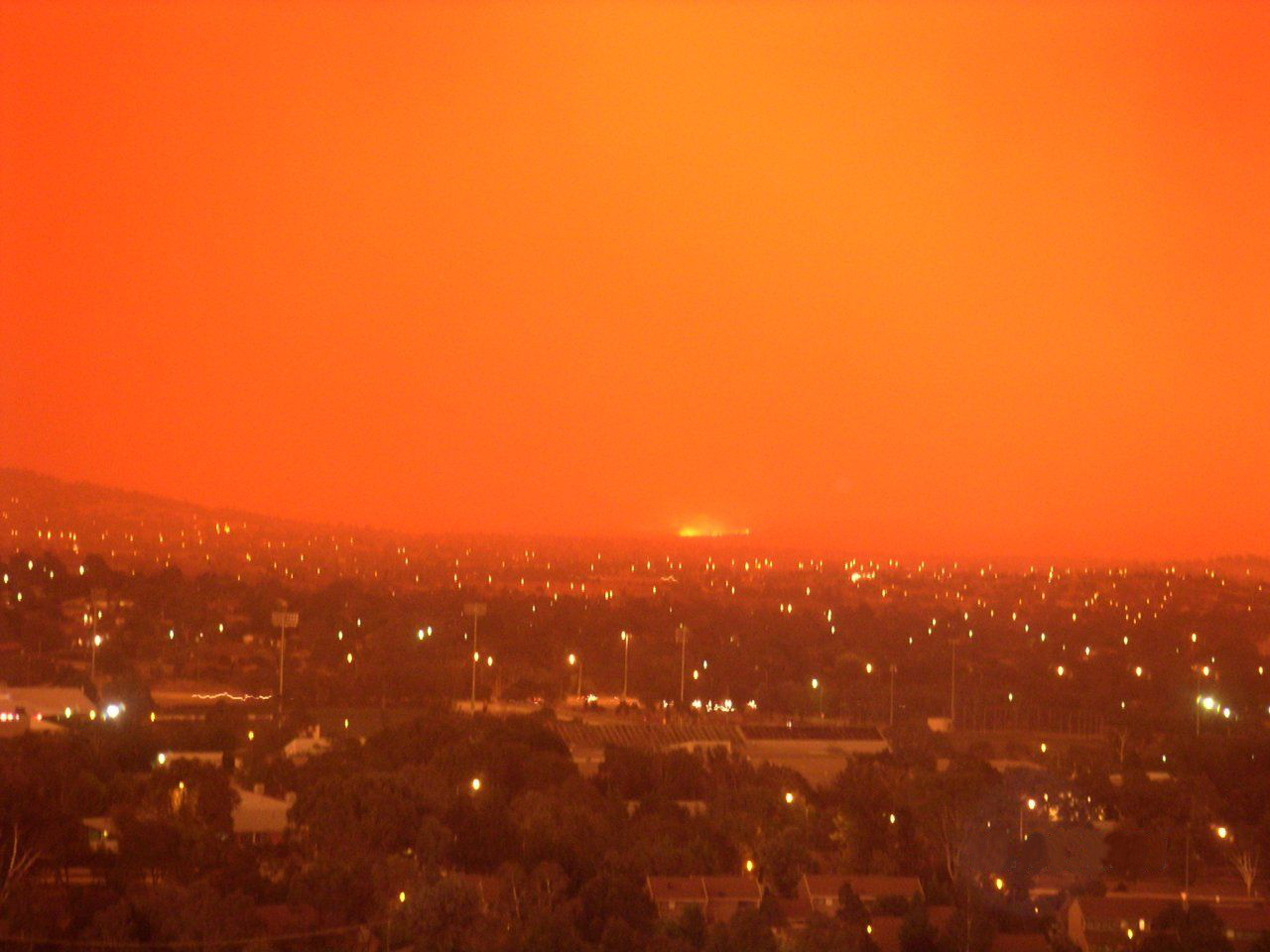
The Canberra bushfires of 2003 claimed 4 lives.

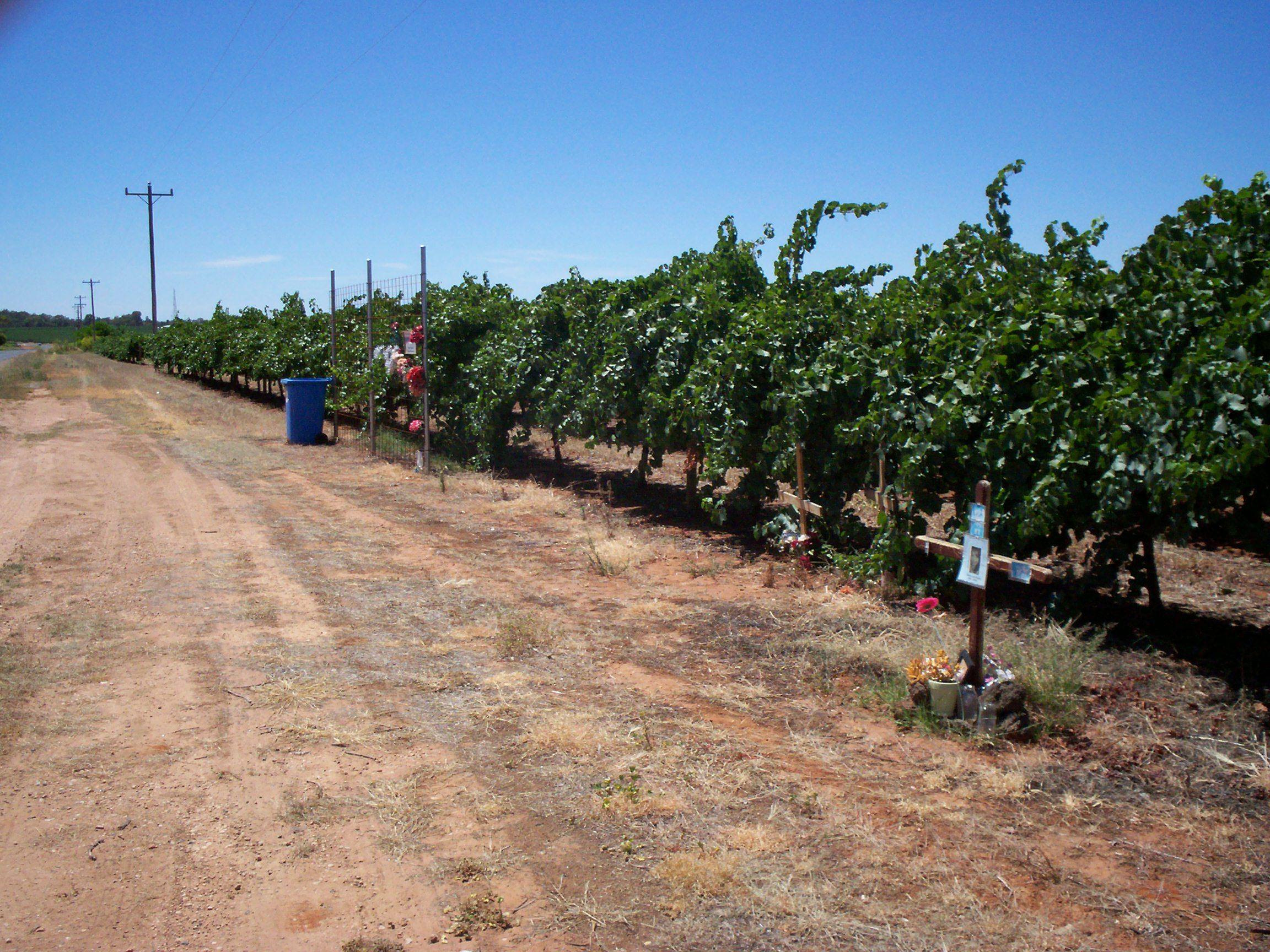
Roadside memorials at Cardross, Victoria, where 6 teenagers died in a hit-and-run accident on 18 February 2006.

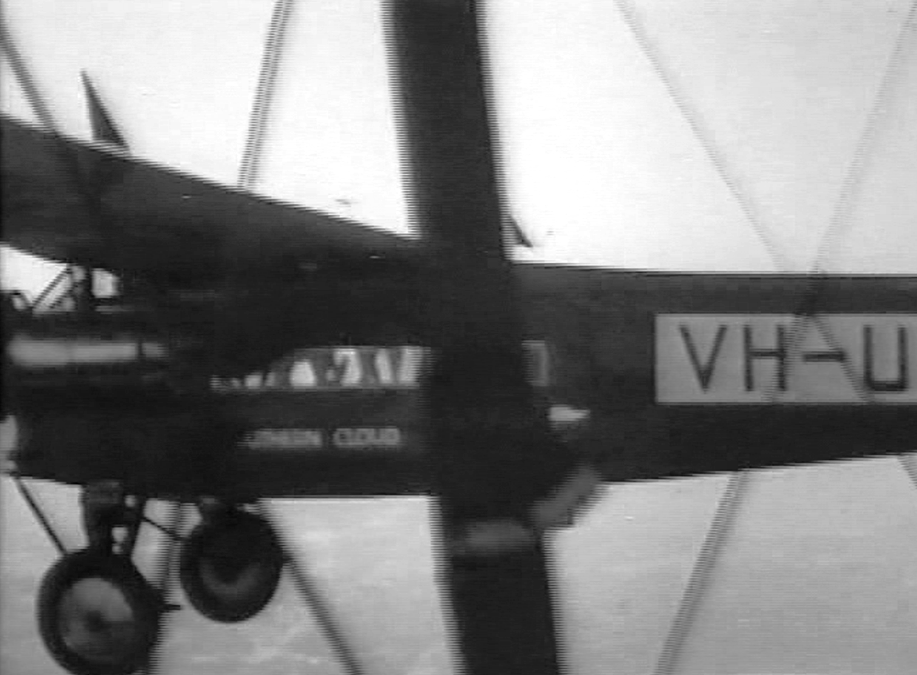
The crash of the Southern Cloud in 1931 claimed 8 lives.

== Significant incidents of Australians being killed outside Australia ==
Excludes deaths attributable to war.

Disaster	Location	Deaths	Date	Notes
Terrorism	Kuta, Bali, Indonesia	88	12 Oct 2002	2002 Bali bombings
Pandemic	Worldwide	54	2020–21	COVID-19 pandemic (overseas Australian deaths as of August 2021)
Missile strike	Hrabove, Donetsk Oblast, Ukraine	38	17 Jul 2014	Malaysia Airlines Flight 17
Tsunami	Thailand and Sri Lanka	26	26 Dec 2004	2004 Indian Ocean earthquake
Air accident	Denpasar, Indonesia	16	22 Apr 1974	Pan Am Flight 812 crashes into a mountain, a total of 107 people were killed.
Flood	Saxeten, Switzerland	14	28 Jul 1999	Flash flood hits canyoning expedition
Volcanic eruption	Whakaari/White Island, New Zealand	14	9 Dec 2019	2019 Whakaari/White Island eruption
Terrorism	New York City and Arlington County, United States	11	11 Sep 2001	11 September 2001 attacks.
Air accident	Nias Island, Indonesia	9	2 Apr 2005	2005 Nias Island Sea King crash crashes while providing relief services to victims of the 2005 Nias–Simeulue earthquake
Air accident	near Isurava, Papua New Guinea	9	12 Aug 2009	Airlines PNG Flight 4684
Road accident	near Cairo, Egypt	6	10 Jan 2006	Tourist bus crash
Air accident	Republic of the Congo	6	20 Jun 2010	2010 Cameroon Aéro Service CASA C-212 Aviocar crash
Air accident	Pakse, Laos	6	16 Oct 2013	Lao Airlines Flight 301
Air accident	Southern Indian Ocean (presumed)	6	8 Mar 2014	Malaysia Airlines Flight 370
Road accident	Yamuna Highway, Northern India	6	10 Jan 2016	Five members of an Indian-Australian family killed in car accident while travelling between Delhi and Agra, sixth member later died in hospital.
Massacre	Balibo, East Timor	5	16 Oct 1975	Balibo Five. Five Australian journalists murdered by Indonesian troops. The Indonesian government claimed that the men were unintentionally killed in a cross-fire but a 2007 inquest ruled that the journalists were deliberately murdered.
Air accident	Yogyakarta, Indonesia	5	7 Mar 2007	Garuda Indonesia Flight 200
Tsunami	Samoa	5	30 Sep 2009	2009 Samoa earthquake and tsunami
Sinking	North Atlantic Ocean	4	15 Apr 1912	Sinking of RMS Titanic. Two other Australians survived.
Missile strike	Sea of Japan	4	1 Sep 1983	Korean Air Lines Flight 007
Air accident	near San Francisco	4+	29 Oct 1953	British Commonwealth Pacific Airlines Flight 304 crashes on approach to San Francisco.
Massacre	Waco, Texas	4	28 Feb 1993 – 19 Apr 2023	Waco Siege. At least two other Australians were among the small number of survivors. A child belonging to one of the Australian victims was also lost but was listed as a US citizen.
Bridge collapse	Ramat Gan, Israel	4	14 Jul 1997	Maccabiah bridge collapse
Terrorism	Jimbaran and Kuta, Bali, Indonesia	4	1 Oct 2005	2005 Bali bombings
Air accident	Tanjung Kupang, Johor, Malaysia	3	4 Dec 1977	Malaysian Airline System Flight 653
Fire	Manoharpur, Odisha, India	3	22 Jan 1999	Australian missionary Graham Staines and sons killed in arson attack
Terrorism	Jakarta, Indonesia	3	17 Jul 2009	JW Marriott/Ritz-Carlton hotel bombing
Air accident	Misima Island, Papua New Guinea	3	31 Aug 2010	Cessna Citation crashed on landing. One New Zealander also killed.
Earthquake	Turkey and Syria	3	6 Feb 2023	2023 Turkey–Syria earthquake
Air accident	Weybridge, United Kingdom	2	13 Apr 1922	Vickers Viking, piloted by Captain Ross Macpherson Smith, crashed on test flight
Air accident	Bay of Bengal	2	8 Nov 1935	Lady Southern Cross, piloted by Sir Charles Kingsford Smith, crashes en route between Allahabad, India and Singapore
Air accident	London, United Kingdom	2	4 Nov 1967	Iberia Airlines Flight 062 crashed while landing at Heathrow Airport
Air accident	Los Rodeos, Tenerife, Canary Islands, Spain	2	27 Mar 1977	KLM and Pan Am jumbos collide on runway (Tenerife airport disaster)
Air accident	off Mauritius	2	28 Nov 1987	South African Airways Flight 295
Air accident	Near Hawaii, United States	2	24 Feb 1989	United Airlines Flight 811 between Honolulu and Auckland experiences explosive decompression
Terrorism	Roermond, Netherlands	2	27 May 1990	Australian tourists shot by the Provisional IRA, in the mistaken belief they are British military personnel
Terrorism	Mumbai, India	2	26 Nov 2008	2008 Mumbai attacks
Air accident	near Qazvin, Iran	2	15 Jul 2009	Caspian Airlines Flight 7908
Typhoon	The Philippines	2	8 Nov 2013	Typhoon Haiyan
Road accident	Narok, Kenya	2	7 Sep 2014	Tourist bus crash.
Air accident	Southern Alps, France	2	24 Mar 2015	Germanwings Flight 9525
Murder	Sinaloa, Mexico	2	20–21 Nov 2015	Two Australian surfers murdered.
Terrorism	London, Great Britain	2	3 Jun 2017	2017 London Bridge attack
Fire	North Kensington, London, United Kingdom	2	14 Jun 2017	Grenfell Tower fire
Road accident	Near Victoria Falls, Zimbabwe	2	23 Dec 2017	Two Australian tourists killed in car crash.
Crowd crush	Itaewon, Seoul, South Korea	2	29 Oct 2022	Seoul Halloween crowd crush
Sinking	Zeebrugge, Belgium	1	6 Mar 1987	Herald of Free Enterprise disaster.
Terrorism	Lockerbie, Scotland	1	21 Dec 1988	Pan Am Flight 103. Although a resident of South Africa, the victim was an Australian national.
Terrorism	Nairobi, Kenya	1	21-24 Sep 2013	Westgate shopping mall attack.
Avalanche	Mount Everest, Himalayas	1	16 Oct 2013	Australian tourist killed in avalanche.
Terrorism	Tunis, Tunisia	1	18 Mar 2015	Bardo National Museum attack
Earthquake	Nepal	1	25 Apr 2015	April 2015 Nepal earthquake. Australian killed below Mt Everest in avalanche triggered by quake.
Shooting	Minneapolis, United States	1	15 Jul 2017	Australian murdered by US police officer.
Terrorism	Barcelona, Spain	1	17 Aug 2017	2017 Barcelona attacks
Avalanche	Tyrol, Austria	1	10 Jan 2019	Teenage boy killed in avalanche in Austrian Alps while skiing.
Explosion	Beirut, Lebanon	1	4 Aug 2020	2020 Beirut explosion
Air accident	Near Pokhara International Airport, Pokhara, Nepal	1	15 Jan 2023	Yeti Airlines Flight 691
Landslide	Jatiluwih, Bali, Indonesia	1	14 March 2024	Tourist killed in landslide triggered by heavy rainfall

== See also ==
- Lists of shipwrecks
- Timeline of major crimes in Australia
- List of mass shootings in Australia
- List of massacres of Indigenous Australians
- List of natural disasters in Australia
- List of disasters in Antarctica by death toll
- List of disasters in Canada by death toll
- List of disasters in Croatia by death toll
- List of disasters in Great Britain and Ireland by death toll
- List of disasters in New Zealand by death toll
- List of disasters in Poland by death toll
- List of disasters in Sweden by death toll
- List of disasters in the United States by death toll
