= 1875–1876 Australia scarlet fever epidemic =

Outbreak of scarlet fever in Australia

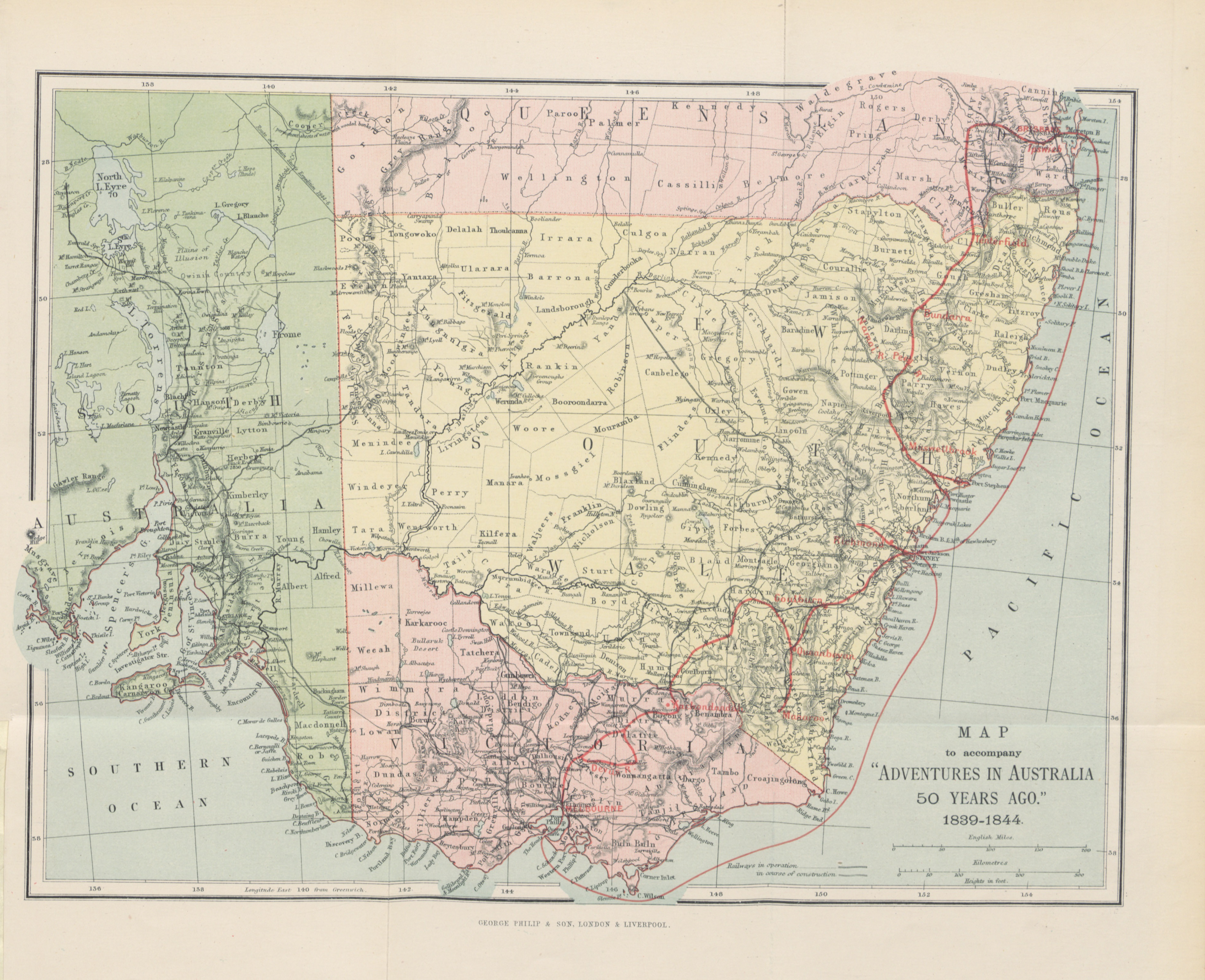
- Map of the colonies of Victoria and New South Wales where the epidemic was active in.
- Disease: Scarlet fever
- Location: Victoria and New South Wales
- First outbreak: Around October 1875
- Deaths: >8,000

The 1875–1876 Australia scarlet fever epidemic was a severe outbreak of scarlet fever in the British colonies of Victoria and New South Wales in Australia. Part of a series of measles and scarlet fever epidemics in Victoria as a result of poor sanitation in the post-gold rush era, the epidemic claimed in both colonies the lives of over 8,000 people, mainly children. The epidemic became Australia's third deadliest disease outbreak and disaster by terms of death toll, and Victoria's worst, but also last major outbreak of scarlet fever.

== Background ==
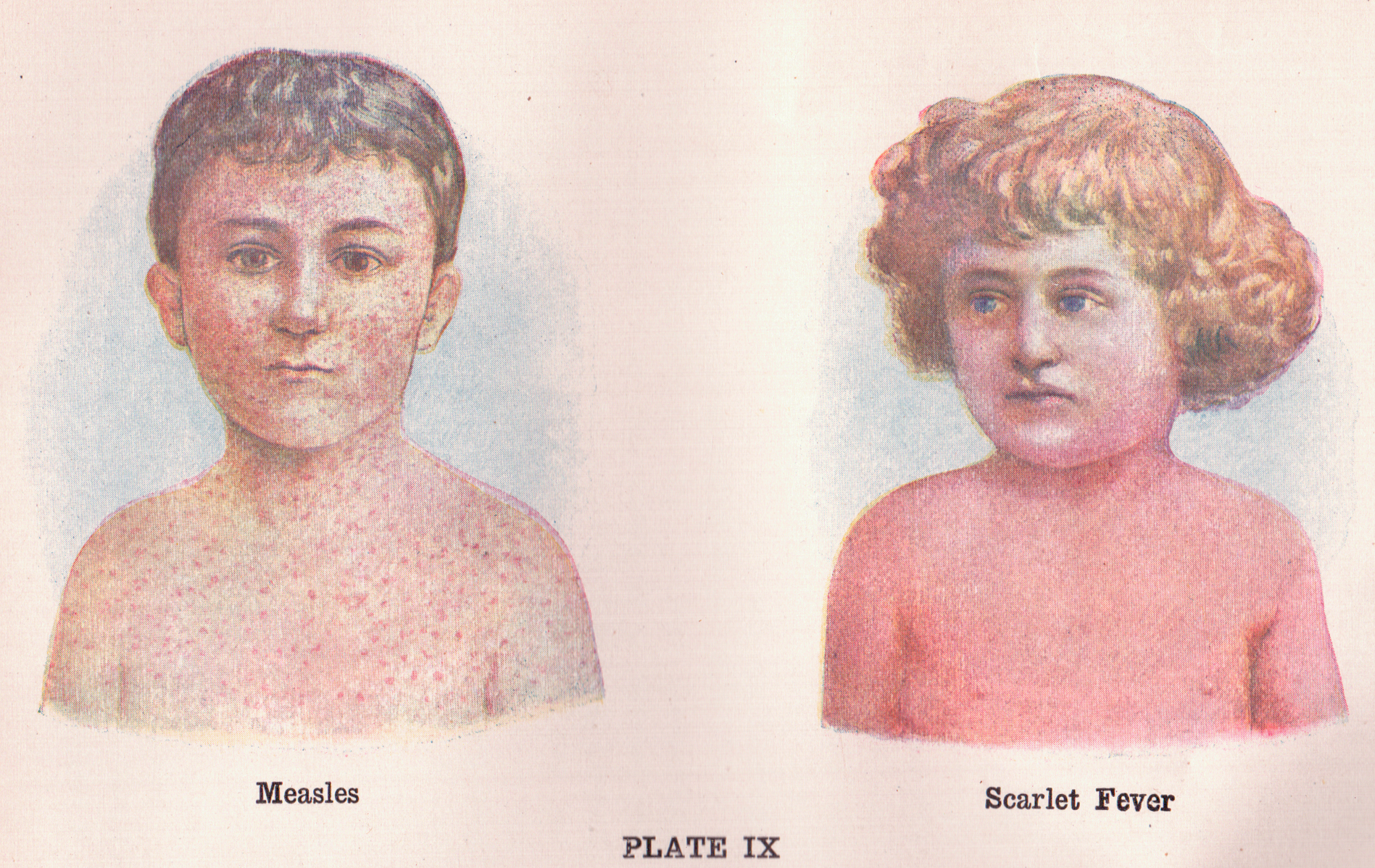
Between 1853 and 1876, Victoria was plagued by synchronous outbreaks of measles and scarlet fever. The difference in the two diseases is shown above.

Scarlet fever is an infectious disease that mainly affects children, mainly those between the ages of 5 and 15 years old. Common symptoms of the disease include sore throat, fever, and a red and blanching rash. Furthermore, the disease can cause complications such as pneumonia, septicaemia, and toxic shock syndrome in patients. Scarlet fever is mainly transmitted through airborne transmission, close contact with the infected, and direct contact with the skin, clothes and bedding of the infected.

Sanitation in colonial Victoria was very poor. Melbourne, the colony's capital, was known for its pervasive odour of human faeces caused by overflowing cesspits, open sewers, and polluted waterways. Victoria's vulnerability to diseases only increased with urbanisation and a rise in population. Since the Victorian Gold Rush of the 1850s and 1860s, large number of people had immigrated to the colony. Additionally, Victoria experienced a baby boom in the 1860s leading to a large population of children by the time of the epidemic.

Not long before the 1875-1876 scarlet fever epidemic began, Victoria had witnessed its worst outbreak of measles between 1874 and 1875. This measles outbreak would prepare the conditions for the 1875-1876 scarlet fever epidemic, but also a rise in tuberculosis due to measle's debilitating effects on the immune system of survivors. Since 1853 and up to the end of the 1875-1876 epidemic, outbreaks of measles and scarlet fever were synchronous in Victoria. According to a 2021 paper published in the academic journal Social Science History, this may suggest the two diseases had a synergistic relationship in Victoria.

== Outbreak ==
=== Cases and casualties ===
Deaths caused by the 1875-1876 scarlet fever epidemic
Location	Deaths
New South Wales	~1,500
(Victoria (state)) Victoria	~6,500
Total	8,000+

The 1875-1876 scarlet fever epidemic caused over 8,000 deaths in both New South Wales and Victoria. During the 1875-1876 epidemic, deaths from scarlet fever peaked in 1876. As is typical with scarlet fever, the majority of the dead were children, and since it began in Victoria, Victoria had a larger number of dead. In Victoria in 1875 due to an overlap of measles and scarlet fever epidemics, the life expectancy at birth dropped to 41.6 years, the lowest it was between 1867 and 1880.

In New South Wales, the epidemic killed around 1,500. In the colony, the worst affected towns were Alexandria and Waterloo. In the colonial capital of Sydney, whose mortality rate is estimated to have been 32 deaths per 1,000 people, almost 600 people died.

=== In Victoria ===
By October 1875, the outbreak had spread to Carlton, Collingwood, Brunswick, Emerald Hill (South Melbourne), Fitzroy, Hotham (North Melbourne), and Melbourne proper. On 9 October 1875, the Victorian Central Board issued statistics on the people who died from scarlet fever between 1 September and 6 October 1875 and were buried in the Melbourne Cemetery. The statistics counted a total of 60 people dead, with the highest amount originating from Collingwood, Carlton and Fitzroy. Among the dead, half were between the ages of 1 and 9 years old. Despite increased precautions, the epidemic continued to spread across the Melbourne area, infecting Prahran, Richmond, Sandhurst, Sandridge (Port Melbourne) by the beginning of November. By the same month, the epidemic had also spread outside the Melbourne area to Ballarat. There were fears in Launceston, Tasmania, that with the start of summer many Victorians may be tempted to flee to Tasmania, risking bringing the disease to the colony, which The Tasmanian wrote "would have every chance to flourish vigorously" on account of poor sanitation in Tasmania. In Geelong, any steamboats coming from Melbourne were thoroughly searched for signs of scarlet fever before being allowed to land.

Around the start of 1876, it had appeared that the spread of scarlet fever in Victoria was diminishing before having a resurgence. According to The Age, a cabman from Brunswick continued to drive clients around despite his family being ill from scarlet fever, helping spread the disease around the area. By February 1876, the epidemic had spread to outside of the Melbourne area to the Victorian towns of Bendigo, Chewton, Daylesford, and Horsham, and to Deniliquin near the Victorian border in New South Wales. By March, scarlet fever had spread to the towns of Aberfeldie, Belmont, Echuca, and Woods Point, and to the local government areas of the Shires of South Barwon and Barrabool, and the Castlemaine District. The outbreak in Castlemaine in particular, became very serious with reports of children going to bed and waking up dead in the morning. The Melbourne Lying-In Hospital, which provides special care for women and babies during childbirth, was closed in December 1875 following two deaths from scarlet fever. At the Ballarat Orphan Asylum, children who had contacted scarlet fever were isolated.

The scarlet fever epidemic drastically affected school attendance in infected towns. In Horsham and Ballarat, school attendance dropped to a third of what it was pre-epidemic. In Ballarat's Dana Street Primary School, 200 students were absent during the epidemic, and in Moolort in the Castlemaine district, no children attended school. Officials in Ballarat ended up recommending the Department of Education close schools in the town. This sharp decrease in attendance was caused by a combination of children falling ill with scarlet fever and parents keeping their children home.

=== In New South Wales ===
Unlike in Victoria, there was little panic from the public, with the epidemic being restricted to the Sydney area. Policies introduced by the New South Wales Legislative Assembly managed to prevent the epidemic from having a larger impact.

== Responses ==
Actions taken to mitigate the spread of scarlet fever included the isolation of sick children, increased use of disinfectants, more thorough laundering of clothes and bedding, and house-to-house checks in areas of most concern. On 9 October 1875, the Victorian Central Board of Health issued additional instructions on precautions needed to be taken to prevent the disease's spread: any clothes or bedding that require washing should be cleaned in boiling water, and that once a patient has recovered, the room they were housed in should undergo fumigation. By October 1875, Inspectors of Nuisances had been sent to clean back lanes and lanes with the right-of-way. On Bell, Brunswick, Fitzroy, Moor Streets in Melbourne, Inspectors of Nuisances had been sent house-to-house to determine the number of sick.

In New South Wales, the Sydney City and Suburban Sewage and Health Board presented a range of ways to mitigate the epidemic to the Legislative Assembly. Methods introduced included restrictions of children attending school, policies related to isolation and quarantine, and doctor visits to the home of those infected with scarlet fever.
