= Amelia Kilian =

Businesswoman in Darin, Australia (c. 1849–1927)

Amelia Albertina Kilian née Gunther (c. 1849 – 22 November 1927) was a Prussian born woman who became and businesswoman and landowner in the Northern Territory of Australia.

== Early life ==
Kilian was born around 1849 to Samuel Gunther and his wife Ernestine, née Hellmscher, and when she was approximately two years old they immigrated to Australia and settled in Victoria. Little else is known of her early life.

On 4 May 1869 in Spring Creek, which is now known as Graytown, Killian married Charles Frederick Killian who was 32, 13 years older than his 19 year old bride. Charles worked as a bootmaker and soon after, in 1870, she gave birth to their first child Henry Otto who was followed in 1874 by a daughter named Amelia Ernestine.

== Life in the Northern Territory ==
Charles moved to the Northern Territory in 1873 and established a boot making business in Darwin and Kilian and their children joined him in July 1974. Later, on 23 April 1876, Kilian was credited as being the first European woman to bear twins in the Northern Territory when she gave birth to Frederick William and Charles Francis.

Despite the demands of her young family Kilian was very involved with her husbands business and established her own retail business. Her husband Charles travelled regularly and trialed various business opportunities and Killian remained in Darwin. In 1888 she bought land, under her own name, in the gold mining town of Burrundie and continued to do so over the next few years; this included several lots at Pine Creek, Union Reef Mine, Southport and town lands in Darwin.

On 20 November 1890 her eldest son, Henry Otto, died of diabetes shortly before his 21st birthday.

Around 1891 Charles left the Northern Territory and travelled to Western Australia, ostensibly for health reasons, and Kilian remained.

In 1895 Killian, alongside her daughter Amelia, where two of the 82 women in the Northern Territory to register to vote in 1895.

Kilian's home was destroyed in the 1897 Darwin cyclone and it was said that portions of the home were "blown into the sea" and that, to survive, Kilian and her children had to hide under the house. Kilian later had to defended herself publicly when she was accused of receiving unneeded funds from the cyclone relief fund. Kilian replied that she had neither requested or received such funds.

In around 1905 Charles returned to Darwin to rejoin Kilian and remained living with her until his death on 5 April 1916. Killian died on 22 November 1926 and, at the age of 77, she was believed to be Darwin's oldest resident. She had lived in the Northern Territory for 53 years.

== Legacy ==
- Killian Crescent and Kilian Park, both in Jingili, Northern Territory are named for her.
