= Pye Lewis =

Australian rules footballer, born 1909

Personal information
- Full name: George Henry Lewis
- Born: 11 August 1909; Graytown, Victoria
- Died: 23 September 1994 (aged 85)
- Original team: Avenel
- Height: 161 cm (5 ft 3 in)
- Weight: 67 kg (148 lb)

Playing career^{1}
Years	Club	Games (Goals)
1935–36	Footscray	22 (8)
- ^{1} Playing statistics correct to the end of 1936.

George Henry "Pye" Lewis (11 August 1909 - 23 September 1994) was an Australian rules footballer who played with Footscray in the Victorian Football League (VFL).
