= Catherine Pett =

Australian school teacher (1864–1926)

Pupils of Darwin Public School with teacher Catherine Pett shown on the right, 1905

Catherine Pett née Cooper (17 November 1864 – 23 January 1926) was a teacher at the Darwin Public School for 22 years as well as acting as a community organiser in Darwin. Pett spent much of her life in the Northern Territory of Australia.

== Early life ==
Pett was born in Moonta, South Australia and was the second eldest of eight children born to James and Eliza Cooper. Pett grew up here and, after completing her schooling, trained as a school teacher, and joined the South Australian Education Department in 1865.

On 14 May 1887 she married William Pett who listed his profession on their marriage certificate as a 'Minister of the Bible Religion' although it appears that this was not his career.

== Life in the Northern Territory ==
In January 1889 Pett arrived in Palmerston, now known as Darwin, to head the school there and replace EP Kitchin, the male teacher who had been working there since 1879. Her appointment was in response to lobbying by residents for him to be replaced with an 'efficient female' and, despite this, her initial salary was £175 a year; this was £45 less than what Kitchin had been paid.

As early as March 1889 Pett requested the government to allow her to take in boarders '[a]s Mr Pett is leaving the company will make the house less lonely' and later, on 10 August 1889, she gave birth to a son. This caused a lot of concern with the government of the day as concerns had been raised about appointing a married woman in the region because of the physical strain of bearing and raising a child in the hot temperature. Concerns were also raised about the 'moral effect' of a schoolmistress conducting her duties while pregnant. In May 1894 Pett lost her otherwise healthy son, known locally as King, to croup (this was also recorded as 'mock croup').

In 1895 Pett's salary was increased to £200 and this is the amount she would be paid for the remainder of her time at the school. Also in 1895 Pett was one of the 82 women who enrolled to vote following the Constitutional Amendment (Adult Suffrage) Act 1894 which granted South Australian women the right suffrage.

Pett's school and her home suffered significant damage in the 1897 Darwin cyclone and, after the destruction she spent a brief period of leave in Adelaide. After this it also appears that Pett became the guardian (or close compainion) of Dorothy Mabel Stretton, a child whose mother was killed in the cyclone.

In December 1898 Pett gave birth to another child, a son named Ronald, and this again raised concerns for the government of the day about her 'teaching capacity' and a petition was organised asking that she be replaced with a male teacher. One of the people that acted in defence of her was William George Stretton, the father of Dorothy. Pett also argued in her own defence to the South Australian government who employed her.

In 1901 Pett and her husband William where listed as living together in Darwin, however, shortly after this he appears to have left the region and not returned. Their son Ronald remained with Pett.

Pett continued to work at the school for another 10 years and she was an active part of the Darwin communication, including as a fund raiser for the church and she was regarded, by many in the community, as a 'thoughtful and humanitarian person who often put others' needs ahead of her own'.

== Later life ==
Pett took leave from Darwin in 1909 and, after some moths away, decided that she would return to South Australia long term and resigned the position she had held for 22 years; she left in October 1910.

She then travelled to Gawler where she taught at the Sandy Creek School for another 15 years.

She died 23 January 1926 in Gawler.
