= Graytown, Victoria =

Graytown
- Town
- Coordinates: 36°49′12.0″S 144°57′0″E
- Country: Australia
- State: Victoria
- Region: Hume
- LGA: Shire of Strathbogie
- Location: 117 km (73 mi) N of Melbourne

Government
  - State electorate: Euroa
  - Federal division: Nicholls
- Elevation: 253 m (830 ft)

Population
  - Total: 60 (2021 census)
- Postcode: 3608
Localities around Graytown
Moormbool West	Wirrate	Wirrate
Moormbool West	Graytown	Mitchellstown
Puckapunyal	Puckapunyal	Puckapunyal

Graytown is a locality in central Victoria, Australia, formerly a gold mining town. It is located 110 kilometres (68 mi) due-north of Melbourne, is just outside the northern edge of the Puckapunyal Military Area, and 20 miles (32 km) south of Rushworth.

== Mining history ==
Influenced by the nearby Rushworth diggings, alluvial gold in Spring Creek was discovered in September 1868 in the area, first on Moonlight Flat, and then the Spring Creek rush in 1869. Spring Creek fed into Major's Creek, then into the Goulburn River.

Originally known as Spring Creek, it then became Moormbool, before becoming Graytown in 1869, named after Wilson Gray, a member of the Victorian Legislative Assembly (1860–1862). Described as "a poor man's diggings", persons were still able to have a "decent living".

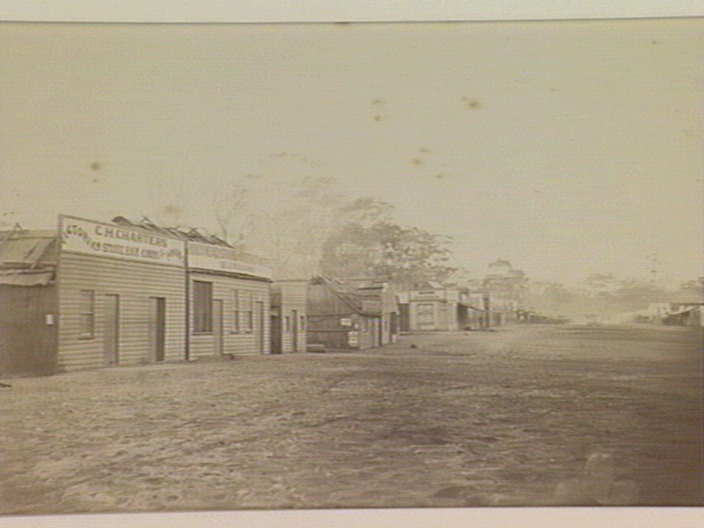
Corbett Street main street, c. 1870

Such was the rapid growth of the town in 1868, with a population of 12 000 persons, water was "almost unattainable" and supplied at four shillings a bucket (in excess of A$22 in 2020).

By 1869 the town population was estimated to be between 30 000 and 40 000 persons. A number of facilities were established: newsagent/tobacconist, baker, library, three doctors, pharmacist, solicitors, mining surveyors, share brokers, auctioneers, architects, horse sales yard, theatre, and a police camp. A police court also operated with justices of the peace. There were thirty-five licensed public hotels including the Albion, Bendigo, Bourke's, Branch (ex-Dunolly), Commercial, Court House, Criterion, Hamburg, Harp of Erin, Heathcote, New Zealand, Port Philip, Prince of Wales (ex-Golden Age), Prospectors', Reefers', Royal, Shamrock, Sportsman's Arms (ex-Ratcliff's), Telegraph, Varieties, Victoria, and the View Point. Other businesses supporting this substantial town included flour depots, ironmongers, timber merchants. Later-renown Mark Foy, with Mr Bentley, ran a drapery.

The banks included the Bank of New South Wales, Bank of Victoria, Colonial Bank of Australasia, Commercial Bank of Australia, and the Oriental Bank Corporation. Newspapers for the town were the Spring Creek Advertiser and McIvor Times, later followed by the twice-weekly Spring Creek Leader (later renamed as the Graytown Leader). There were also three churches: Catholic, Anglican, and Wesleyan. The area was served by both Cobb & Co and O'Connor's stage coaches. The nearest hospital was at Heathcote. Fogarty was a common family within the town.

Dust whipped up by the winds became a major source of discomfort. No major gold finds occurred.

=== Town decline ===
After the major Spring Creek flood in the night-time winter of 1871, which also filled the mining shafts, the town declined, and by May 1871, the borough of Graytown had 854 males, 566 females, and 42 Chinese (totalling 1442 persons). By 1875, the population was down to 130 persons. Buildings were moved to nearby Heathcote or Nagambie. Another rush was reported for early 1878, but considered "no good" with the workers of Chinese ethnicity returning to Cooktown in far north Queensland.

By 1880, the borough became part of the Shire of McIvor.

Members of the town served in the First Australian Imperial Force in World War I.

The 1869 school was established, although the first building occupying part of the Court House Hotel burned down in August 1875, and continued until the 1920s.

Another attempt for gold mining was undertaken by June 1897 by the Surface Hill Company, going down to 150 feet (46 m), and was marketed as showing "good prospects". The last working mine closed in 1908.

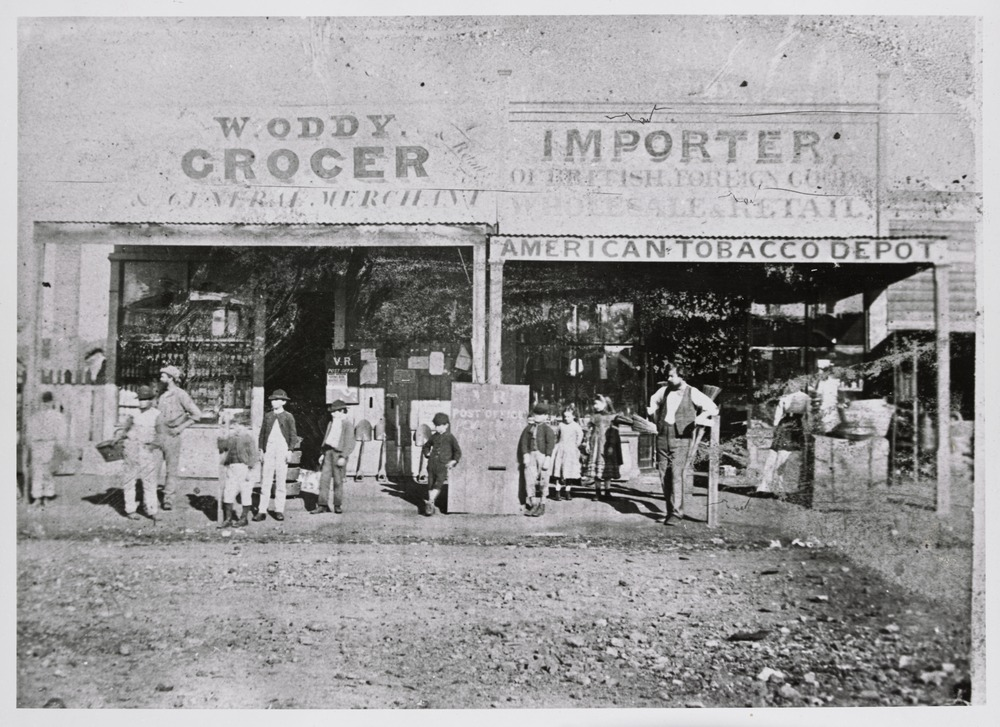
Oddy's shop, c. 1870

Long-term identity William Oddy died in August 1912 aged 75, having resided in the district for forty-four years. He became mayor of the borough three times, preserved the town name of Graytown, was postmaster, storekeeper, and ran Oddy's Post Office Hotel and hall in the town. Oddy's hotel was the last of the town's thirty-five. The hotel was transferred in 1918 to the Crossle family, descendants of the Oddys, who maintained a homestead in the area until 1943. The 1870 Post Office Hotel licence was surrendered on 31 December 1922, and the building expected to be pulled down in late 1923: "it will be the end of A Poor Man's Diggings, and the last link with the Spring Creek rush will have been broken for ever".

By 1917 the former-town consisted of a small school, four houses, three huts, a hotel/store, a post-office, and the small Methodist church. A number of mullock heaps stood near mining shafts, some 100 feet (30 m) down. Forests regrew after the severe harvesting for mining structures and shaft supports, and a tramline was used to cart timber to Tooborac for the Melbourne market.

== WWII prisoner of war camp ==
During World War II, an Italian and German prisoner of war camp was established to hold 250 internees. It was guarded by the 23rd Garrison Battalion, POW Area, Murchison. Many of the German military were from German auxiliary cruiser Kormoran, which had sunk a significant Australian naval ship. One camp internee was a German staff medical officer, Dr Oskar Lütz (POW No. 41014), who allegedly had established a Werwolf resistance group inside the camp. Only building foundations remain (GPS 36.81538°S 144.94880°E).

An escapee POW from the Goulburn Valley internment camp was also captured in the town in November 1944.

== Today ==
By 1933, the local population was given to be 69 persons.

Post-World War II, a Balt Camp was established for displayed immigrants from the Baltic nations, with 31 men employed as forestry workers.

By the 2000s, the area is state forest and farming, and is part of the Heathcote-Graytown National Park. The Spring Creek Nature Conservation Reserve is to the north of the locale. Abandoned mine shafts still exist. A winery has been established since 1955.

An army proving and experimental establishment (P&EE) was established in 1968, operated by the Australian Defence Science and Technology Organisation as part of the Department of Defence's Joint Proof and Experimental Unit (JPEU), to evaluate weapon systems and ammunition. It was headed by a lieutenant colonel. The 3,000 hectares (7,400 acres) site was part of the old Crossle homestead.

In 2018, the area's population was listed as 58.

== Notable persons ==
- Amelia Kilian (c. 1849–1927), one-time resident before becoming a Northern Territory businesswoman.
- Pye Lewis (1909–1994), Australian rules footballer.
