= 1891–1910 Western Australia typhoid epidemic =

Outbreak of typhoid fever in Western Australia

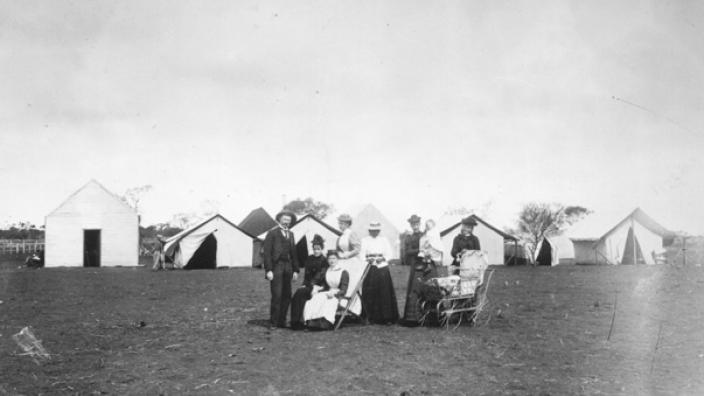
- Staff in front of the newly established Coolgardie Hospital, 1894
- Disease: Typhoid fever
- Location: Western Australia
- First outbreak: Perth, Western Australia
- Dates: 1891-1910
- Suspected cases: ~16,000
- Deaths: >1,879

The 1891-1910 Western Australia typhoid epidemic was a severe outbreak of typhoid fever that affected Western Australia (WA), particularly the eastern goldfields, from 1891 to 1910. The epidemic was the result of the unsanitary conditions of towns and settlements caused by the massive influx of people as part of the Western Australian gold rushes, providing the suitable conditions for typhoid to become an epidemic. Over 2,000 people, mainly young men, died. It was the largest epidemic of typhoid fever in Australia and Australia's fourth deadliest disease outbreak.

== Background ==
Typhoid fever is an infectious waterborne disease caused by the bacteria Salmonella enterica serotype Typhi whose spread is linked to poor sanitation. In the 1890s, the discovery of gold in remote WA around the modern-day goldfields region led to a massive influx of optimistic prospectors to areas with barely any infrastructure or development, and the establishment of tent cities. Kalgoorlie, established during the gold rush, rapidly grew from a population of 2,000 in 1898 to 30,000 in 1903. Gold discoveries, whereupon these settlements were established around, were normally made in remote areas far from existing public health services - compounding the issue as ill individuals could not seek proper health treatment.

The sanitary conditions of many of the towns and settlements in the goldfields was extremely poor. Crowded tent towns had a limited supply of water that was foul along with only the most basic of health amenities. Water shortages in mining camps led to water from any source and of any quality being consumed. By the 1890s, the link between typhoid and poor sanitation was well-known. The acting health officer at Coolgardie, Dr. Hill, identified that people would defecate around clumps of scrubs on hills. Faecal matter then drained in water collected lower down and led to typhoid after consumption. These warnings to avoid drinking foul water did have an effect as some resorted to drinking alternatives such as tea or alcohol. In a 1896 letter written by William de Mole, who was an engineer working in Kalgoorlie, to his family in Victoria, he wrote "I simply long for a drink of good clear cool spring water, and sick of tea and all sorts of cooked water, but dare not drink it raw."

Yet, some people were still undeterred from drinking foul water owing to the presence of medical officials who refuted the link to water quality. Western Mail published in April 1895 a paper by a Perth doctor that supported a theory that typhoid was an airborne disease and argued that wearing a cotton-wool respirator (facemask) was the most effective way to avoid infection, although he conceded this was impractical owing to the hot climate of the outback.

== Spread and responses ==
The epidemic of typhoid began first by affecting Perth, WA's capital. The Sydney Morning Herald reported on 9 May 1891 that typhoid in Perth was very severe and cases were caused by defective drainage. By this point, two confirmed deaths had occurred. Typhoid then spread to outlying town centres such as Northam, and then to temporary townships like Woolgangie heading towards the goldfields. The epidemic was also spread in the opposite direction as men returned to Perth from the goldfields. Between October 1895 and September 1896, Perth recorded 663 cases, most originating from the goldfields, with a 13% mortality rate. For the first quarter of 1896, 101 deaths were attributed to typhoid, accounting for 32% of all deaths in WA. Esperance recorded two cases in March 1896.

The epidemic reached Kalgoorlie district by 1895, where three deaths took place between August 1895 and February 1896. Infections in Kalgoorlie increased in February 1896 when Kalgoorlie hospital admitted 24 patients for typhoid and recorded one death. By April, 64 of the 76 patients admitted to Kalgoorlie hospital had typhoid and accounted for five deaths. Despite cooler weather in the winter, typhoid continued to grow in the Kalgoorlie area. In June, there were 96 new cases and four deaths. In July, there were 18 new cases and seven deaths. Between 1 December 1896 and 27 April 1897, 195 typhoid cases were admitted to hospital with 34 deaths for a mortality rate of 17%. 75 (38%) of these cases were miners, 15 were food workers and 9 were women. In the summer of 1902, during a heat wave where shade temperatures were above 38 °C (100 °F), Kalgoorlie hospital recorded over 90 new cases. In March 1906, the hospital had 43 typhoid patients.

The Progress Committee on the outbreak sent a telegram to Premier John Forrest stating "Health of town most unsatisfactory. Fever spreading, deaths daily and business threatened. No sanitary measures enforced or enforceable..." in 1895. The goldfields lacked the health services needed to properly respond to the epidemic as there were not enough hospitals and nursing services were poorly equipped. Coolgardie received their first hospital in 1893. In 1895, a hospital was opened in Kalgoorlie - first in a tent then in a permanent building. Early admissions in 1896 showed that two-thirds of patients were suffering from enteric fever caused by Salmonella enterica serotypes Typhi and Paratyphi. Serotype Paratyphi causes paratyphoid fever, which is similar to typhoid. By February 1896, Kalgoorlie hospital had only 24 beds and had to refuse admission for four patients due to a lack of beds. In the same month, a majority of its patients (24 out of 41) suffered from typhoid. Increased typhoid cases led to the hospital expanding to include more beds. Overcrowding at Perth Public Hospital led to all tuberculosis patients being ejected on 22 February 1904 to accommodate for typhoid patients, although they remained in the hospital. Dr. Williams' Pink Pills for Pale People was also advertised as medication for typhoid.

A gradual decline in cases post-federation saw typhoid cases return to a normal level by 1910, thereby ending the epidemic. In May 1905, Perth recorded 37 cases in contrast to May 1904 where 65 new cases were recorded. The decline in the goldfields was in part the result of the Goldfields Water Supply Scheme (constructed between 1896 and 1903) supplying the goldfields with drinking water, reducing water scarcity and the need to drink water regardless of quality. Additionally, improved infrastructure and development uplifted living standards and improved sanitation. Despite this, there was a spike in 1910 as WA recorded 571, of which 388 were in Perth. In contrast, Perth recorded 335 cases in 1909. Yet, by this point the epidemic's severity in the goldfields was very much on the decline as Perth recorded most of WA's cases.

== Impacts ==
The official death toll for the epidemic is 1,879 but the true number is likely higher as many deaths, especially for immigrants from other parts of Australia or from overseas, would've went unreported. Up to 20% of mostly healthy young men in the WA goldfields died from typhoid during the epidemic.

A book on the epidemic titled ‘Gold and Typhoid: Two Fevers’ a Social History of Western Australia 1891-1900 was published in 1988 by Vera Whittington. In it, she estimates that about 16,000 people became infected with typhoid during the epidemic.
