= The Tasmanian =

Australian newspaper

Front page of The Tasmanian, 1 January 1881

The Tasmanian was a newspaper published in Launceston, Tasmania, Australia between 1871 and 1895.

Digitised editions from 1881 to 1895 are available via Trove.

== See also ==
- List of newspapers in Australia
