= 1897 Darwin cyclone =

Tropical cyclone in Australia's Northern Territory

Overall effects
- Fatalities: >28
- Damage: A$150,000
- Areas affected: Northern Territory

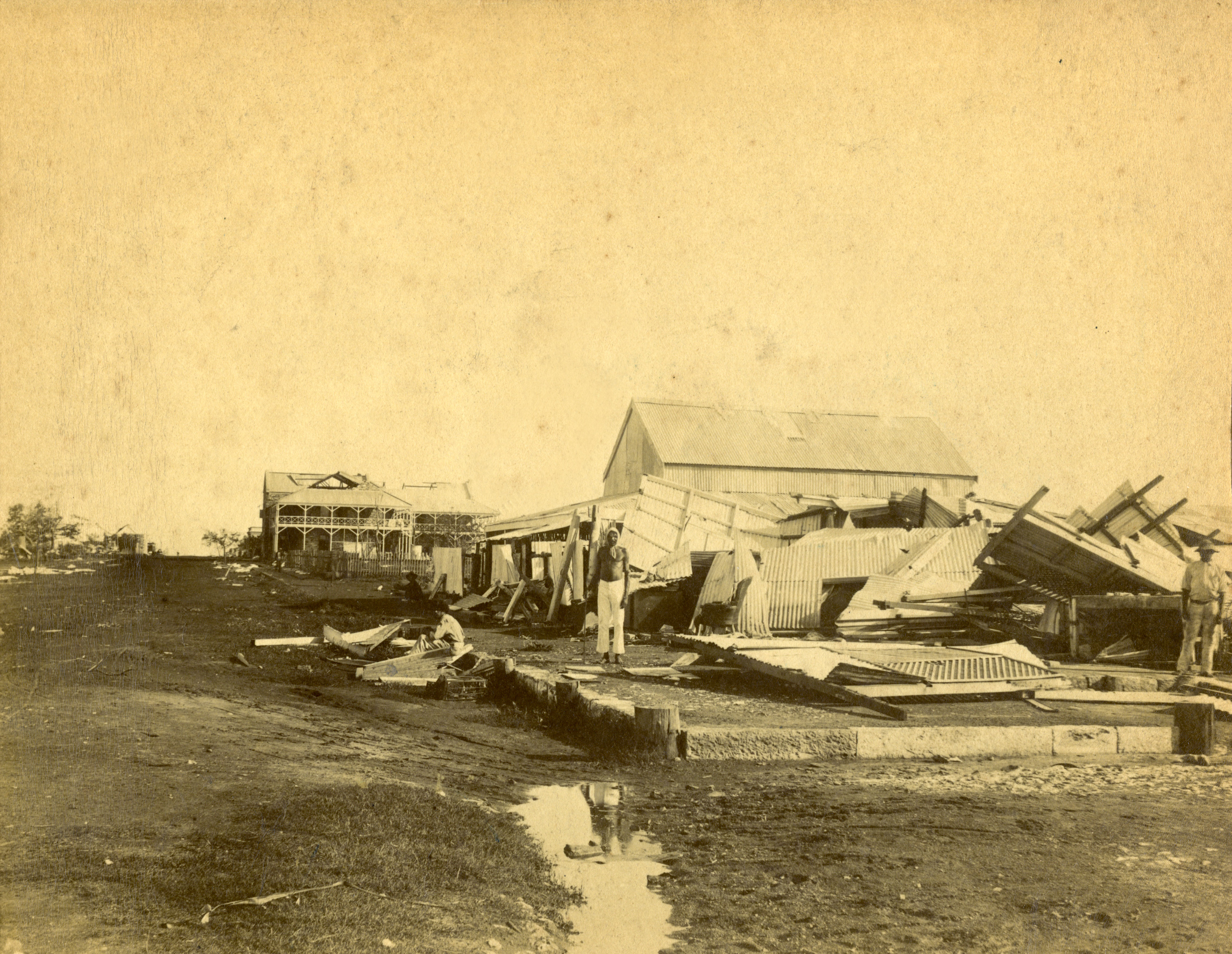
Three men among the debris of a collapsed building after the 1897 cyclone

The 1897 Darwin cyclone was a tropical cyclone that destroyed the city of Darwin in the Northern Territory of Australia. It is considered the worst cyclone to strike the Northern Territory of Australia prior to Cyclone Tracy in 1974. Prior to contemporary naming conventions, the storm became known as the "Great Hurricane".

== Damage ==
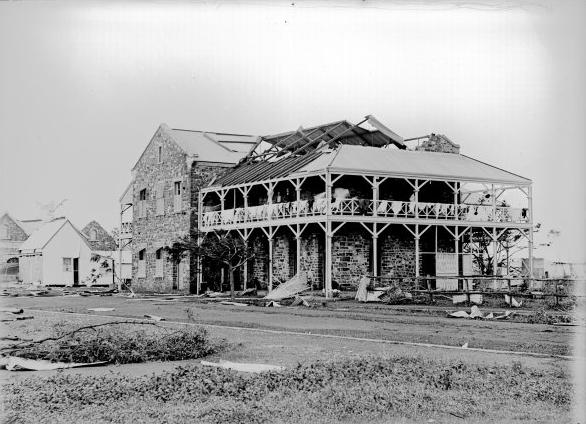
The Victoria Hotel after the 1897 cyclone

The cyclone hit Darwin in the evening of the 6 January 1897, peaking between 3.30am and 4.30am on 7 January. It dumped 292 mm (11.5 in) of rain on Darwin, then known as Palmerston. It uplifted roofs, uprooted trees and telegraph poles destroying almost all of the buildings. The only remaining structures include the historic Victoria Hotel, doctors residence, BAT House, the Commercial and E. S. & A. Banks and the Court House. These remaining structures housed scores of homeless residents after the cyclone.

There were 28 fatalities, mostly Chinese and Aboriginal people. One family was reported to have run from three different houses as they were destroyed around them, surviving without injury. Illness spread throughout the predominantly homeless population after the cyclone. While little is known about the Aboriginal loss of life, the deaths of a couple of women who sought refuge in the Roman Catholic Church before its collapse were documented.

The other major loss of life occurred on Darwin Harbour, with the deaths of many "coloured persons" working in the pearling industry. Of 29 vessels in the harbour at the time, 18 were wrecked, mostly pearling luggers such as the Flowerdale, Maggie, Roebuck, Cleopatra, Olive, Florence, Revenge, Jack, Black Jack, Brisbane and Galatea. The government steam launch and three sampans were also damaged. Many crews donated to the rebuilding efforts. The pearling fleet was quickly restored and expanded and by 1898, 55 vessels were operational.

Another building that suffered significant damage was the Darwin Public School, and the home of its schoolmistress Catherine Pett, which were largely destroyed.

One of the people to lose their home was businesswoman Amelia Kilian and parts of her house was reported to have "blown into the sea" and her survival, alongside her children, was considered miraculous.

The damage is estimated to have cost over £150,000 in 1897 values.

== See also ==
- Cyclone Tracy
- Cyclone Marcus
