= William Booth Memorial Home fire =

1966 fire in Melbourne, Australia

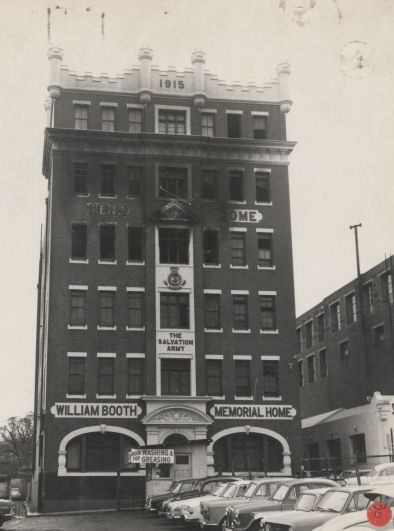
- The aftermath of the fire.
- Date: August 13, 1966
- Venue: William Booth Memorial Home
- Location: Melbourne, Australia; 37.8130°S 144.9558°E
- Type: Fire
- Cause: Illegal heater
- Deaths: 30

The William Booth Memorial Home fire occurred on 13 August 1966 at the William Booth Memorial Home for destitute and alcoholic men in Melbourne, Australia. With 30 dead, it remains the nation's deadliest building fire.

== Fire ==
The fire started on the third floor after a boarder knocked over an illegal heater. The fire smoldered for several hours in room #1 and exploded after a fellow boarder opened the room's door. A backdraft and flashover ensued, and fire and smoke engulfed the third and fourth floors. Most of the 30 men who died were caged in their chain-link fencing-covered rooms and had no time to escape.

The Salvation Army staff delayed their call to the Melbourne Fire Brigade in the mistaken belief they could control the fire. Due to the late arrival of the ambulance service the fire fighters were tied up in resuscitating the victims, delaying the rescue attempts.

== Aftermath and remembrance ==
On the 50th anniversary, 13 August 2016, a plaque was laid where the original building once stood. The ceremony was conducted by the Metropolitan Fire Brigade's Acting Deputy Chief Fire Officer Robert Purcell and Major Brendan Nottle from The Salvation Army. The plaque was paid for by the Metropolitan Fire Brigade.

A service was then held at The Salvation Army Temple on Bourke Street. It was led by Major Brendan Nottle and replicated the service of 50 years ago which remembered the 15 deceased who were unclaimed by relatives.

A mini documentary was made by the Metropolitan Fire Brigade (Melbourne) featuring interviews with the fire fighters and footage of the conflagration. A Movietone News clip was produced after the fire.
