= Air Inter Flight 696Y =

1972 aviation accident

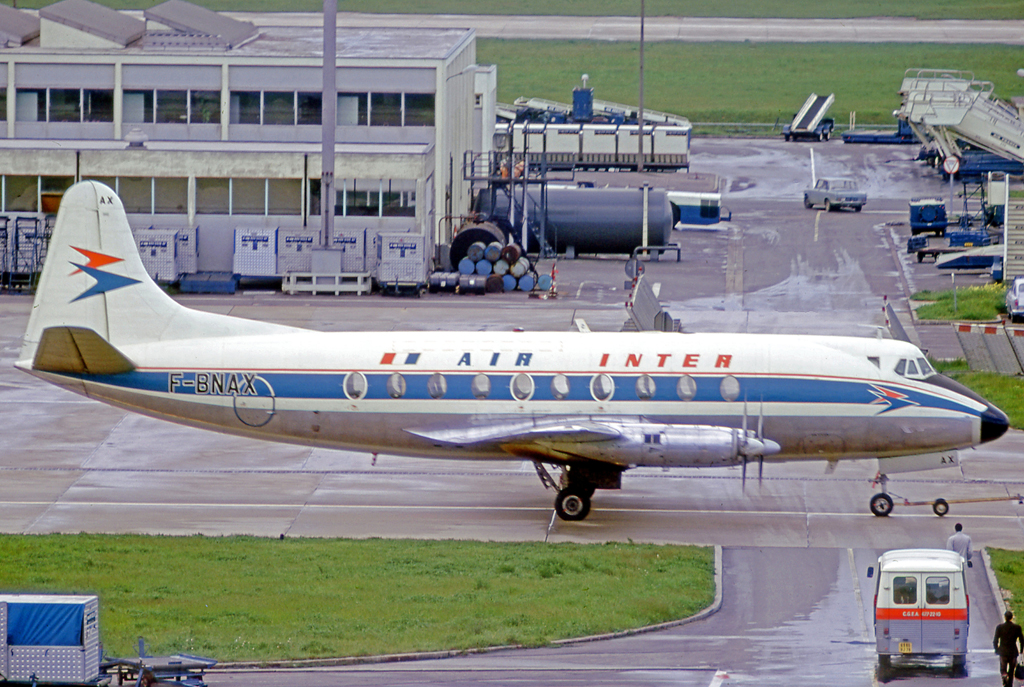
- An Air Inter Vickers Viscount 724 similar to the one involved

Accident
- Date: October 27, 1972
- Summary: Controlled flight into terrain due to pilot error
- Site: Noirétable, France

Aircraft
- Aircraft type: Vickers Viscount 724
- Operator: Air Inter
- Registration: F-BMCH
- Flight origin: Lyon–Bron Airport
- Destination: Clermont-Ferrand Auvergne Airport
- Occupants: 68
- Passengers: 63
- Crew: 5
- Fatalities: 60
- Injuries: 3
- Survivors: 8

Air Inter Flight 696Y was a scheduled revenue passenger flight from Lyon–Bron Airport to Clermont-Ferrand Auvergne Airport, France. On 27 October 1972, the aircraft operating the flight, a Vickers Viscount 724, crashed during the final approach to Clermont Ferrand Auvergne Airport. Of the 68 occupants on board, 60 perished.

== Accident ==
On October 27, 1972, the Vickers Viscount 724 took off from Lyon–Bron Airport at 18:48, operating Flight 696 to Clermont-Ferrand Auvergne Airport. In Clermont, most passengers would take a flight to Bordeaux from Paris.

The Vickers Viscount was carrying 63 passengers and 5 crew. It took off from Lyon in a violent storm, its last radio contact with the Lyon control tower being at 7:20pm and not responding to subsequent calls.

While approaching to land at Clermont-Ferrand Auvergne Airport, it crashed around 7:20 pm in the La Faye forest, almost on top of the Mont Picot massif at an altitude of 1000 meters, in the Forez mountains. The accident occurred on the border of the departments of Loire, commune of Noirétable, and Puy-de-Dôme, commune of Viscomtat, with the massif between the two villages.

== See also ==
- Air Inter Flight 148
