= Clermont-Ferrand Auvergne Airport =

Airport in Clermont-Ferrand, France

Clermont-Ferrand Auvergne Airport Aéroport de Clermont-Ferrand Auvergne

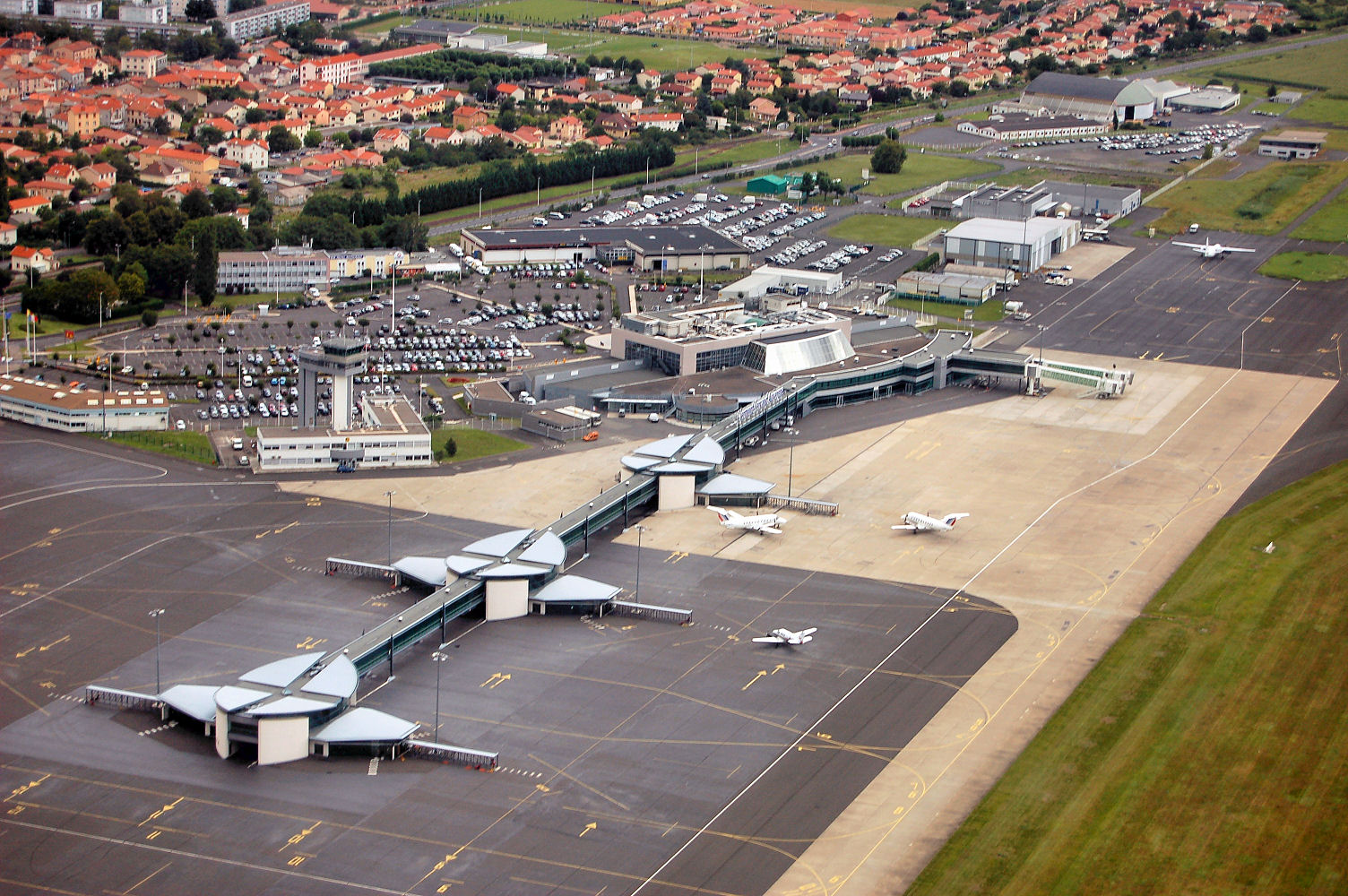
- IATA: CFE; ICAO: LFLC

Summary
- Airport type: Public
- Operator: CCI de Clermont-Ferrand / Issoire
- Location: Clermont-Ferrand
- Elevation AMSL: 1,090 ft (330 m)
- Coordinates: 45°47′09″N 003°09′45″E
- Website: clermont-aeroport.com

Map
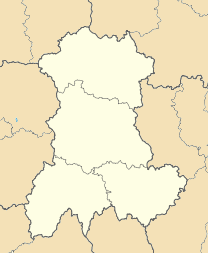
- Location of airport in Auvergne region LFLC (France)

Runways
Direction	Length		Surface
Direction	m	ft	Surface
08/26	3,015	9,892	Asphalt
08L/26R	909	2,982	Grass
01/19	705	2,313	Grass

Statistics (2018)
- Passengers: 430,696
- Passenger traffic change: ▲8.7%
- Sources: Aeroport.fr

Clermont-Ferrand Auvergne Airport (French: Aéroport de Clermont-Ferrand Auvergne) (IATA: CFE, ICAO: LFLC) is an airport serving the French city of Clermont-Ferrand. It is located 6.8 km (3.7 nautical miles) east of the city, in Aulnat, both communes of the Puy-de-Dôme department in the Auvergne region of France, in the middle of France. It is the main airport of the Auvergne region, the others are Aurillac Airport and Le-Puy-en-Velay Airport. In 2002, the airport handled a record 1,090,417 passengers making it one of the busiest airports in France.

== History ==
In 1916 the first hard runway was built on this site (now runway 08/26), the first terminal would open at the airport in 1937. The terminal had a footprint of 200 m^{2}. In 1975 the runway was extended to its current 3,015 m. A year later in 1976 the airport had a category 3 ILS system installed. The current terminal was built in 1992.

The airport used to be the hub of Regional Airlines, an important regional airline in France. Regional Airlines was bought by Air France in 2000 and Air France moved Regional's hub (now Hop!) to the airport of Lyon St Exupéry, about a hundred kilometers away.

Over one million passengers went to Clermont-Ferrand Auvergne airport in 2002, with more than 30 destinations in France and in Europe. More recently, there were only 14 destinations at the airport and 400,295 passengers in 2015.

== Facilities ==
The airport resides at an elevation of 1,090 feet (332 m) above mean sea level. It has one asphalt paved runway designated 08/26 which measures 3,015 by 45 metres (9,892 ft × 148 ft), plus two grass runways: one parallel to 08/26 which measures 909 by 50 metres (2,982 ft × 164 ft) and one designated 01/19 which measures 705 by 60 metres (2,313 ft × 197 ft). The passenger terminal is 17,600 square metres (189,000 sq ft) large.

== Ground Transport ==
The train station serving Aulnat also serves the airport and is therefore named Aulnat-Aéroport.

== Airlines and destinations ==
=== Passenger ===
The following airlines operate regular scheduled and charter flights to and from Clermont-Ferrand:

Airlines	Destinations
Air Corsica	Seasonal: Ajaccio
Air France	Paris–Charles de Gaulle; Seasonal: Bastia, Figari, Nice
ASL Airlines France	Seasonal: Algiers
Ryanair	Porto

The nearest international airport is Lyon–Saint-Exupéry Airport, located 192 km (119 mi) east of Clermont-Ferrand Auvergne Airport. However, if passengers would fly internationally from this airport, they would need to transit at Paris's Charles de Gaulle Airport to get to other international destinations.

=== Cargo ===
Airlines	Destinations
Magma Aviation	Dakar–Diass

== Incidents ==
- On 28 December 1971, Vickers Viscount F-BOEA of Air Inter was damaged beyond economic repair when it departed the runway on a training flight during a simulated failure of #4 engine.
- On 27 October 1972, Air Inter Flight 696Y, Vickers Viscount 724 F-BMCH, en route from Lyon to Clermont-Ferrand, crashed 4 km west of Noirétable during bad weather; 60 on board died, 8 survived. The subsequent investigation determined that the accident was caused by the flight crew's failure to notice that their plane's radio compass had shifted 180 degrees, most likely the result of electrical discharges in the rainstorm they were flying through. The crew may have followed the erroneous reading as they attempted to fly an approach pattern using Clermont-Ferrand's non-directional beacon (NDB). The aircraft descended too early and struck a mountain 44 km (27 mi) east of the airport.
