= Air Inter Flight 2611 =

1963 aviation accident in France

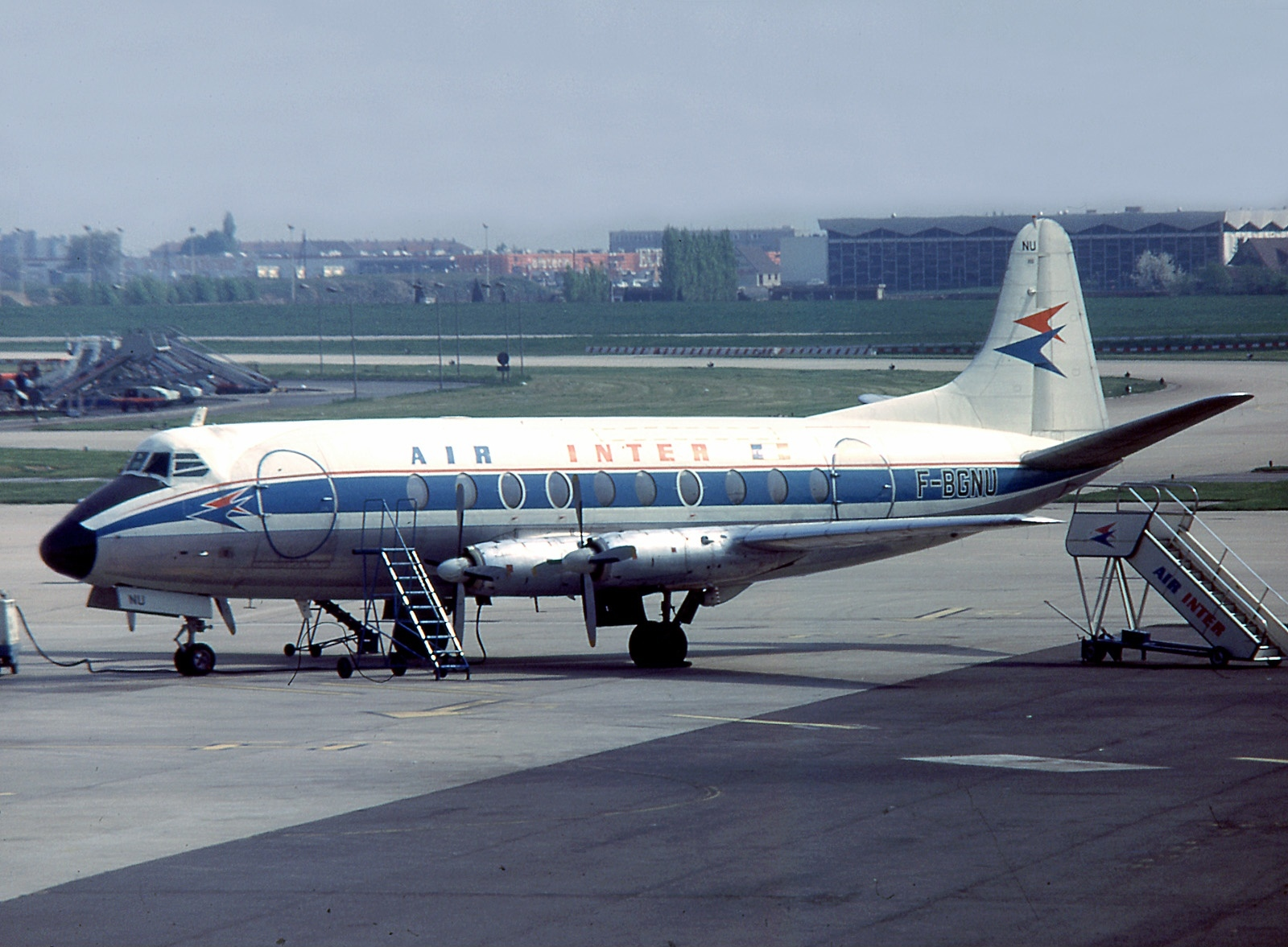
- An Air Inter Vickers Viscount similar to the one involved

Accident
- Date: 12 August 1963
- Summary: Controlled flight into terrain in inclement weather
- Site: Tramoyes, Lyon, France
- Total fatalities: 16
- Total injuries: 3
- Total survivors: 1

Aircraft
- Aircraft type: Vickers Viscount 708
- Operator: Air Inter
- Registration: F-BGNV
- Flight origin: Lille Airport, Lille, France
- Stopover: Lyon–Bron Airport, Lyon, France
- Destination: Nice Côte d'Azur Airport, Nice, France
- Occupants: 16
- Passengers: 12
- Crew: 4
- Fatalities: 15
- Injuries: 1
- Survivors: 1 (initially 4)

Ground casualties
- Ground fatalities: 1
- Ground injuries: 2

Air Inter Flight 2611, also known as the Tramoyes crash, was a domestic flight in France en routing Lille - Lyon - Nice. On 12 August 1963, the Vickers Viscount 708 crashed during the approach to Lyon–Bron Airport, killing 15 of the 16 on board and 1 on the ground.

== Background ==
=== Aircraft ===
The aircraft involved in the accident was a Vickers Viscount 708, manufactured in 1954 and registered F-BGNV. The aircraft was initially delivered to Air France on August 25, 1954 and then was purchased by Air Inter on March 27, 1962. At the time of the accident, it had accumulated 12,732 flight hours.

=== Crew member ===
- Captain: Georges Valencia, aged 37, who had 7,400 flight hours, including 1,125 flight hours of the type
- Co-pilot: Guy Cleret-Langavant, aged 33, who had 5,795 flight hours, including 462 flight hours of the type
- Stewardess: Christiane Souleil, aged 24, been in service for 1594 flight hours
- Stewardess: Liliane Perois, aged 20, been in service for 196 flight hours

== Accident ==
At 13:51, the flight took off from Lille Airport in IFR condition and was then cruising at FL150. At 15:00, the plane began its descent to Lyon–Bron Airport. At 15:09, the plane reported to have descended to FL40 and was cleared to land for Runway 17. However, a Sud Aviation Caravelle was preparing for take-off so the aircraft was ordered to hold position at FL30. At 15:13, the plane encountered storms and was permitted to descend to FL25. At 13:20, witness stated that they saw the plane flying at a very low altitude middle of the storm.

The aircraft struck into trees, then the roof of a farmhouse, and finally an utility pole, before coming to rest in a field near Tramoyes, 15 km from Lyon/Bron airport. There were initially four survivors, including stewardess Christiane Souleil, all but one succumbed to their injuries, leaving Elsa Simon, a 5-year-old girl, as sole survivor. A total of 16 people died, 15 on the plane and 1 on the ground, a 19-year-old boy in a farmhouse. Another 2 boys on the scene sustained injuries.

== Investigation ==
The probable cause for the crash was that the plane was struck by lightning. The crew was disorientated from the flash, making them unable to determine their position and descend the plane to a critically low altitude.

== Memorial ==
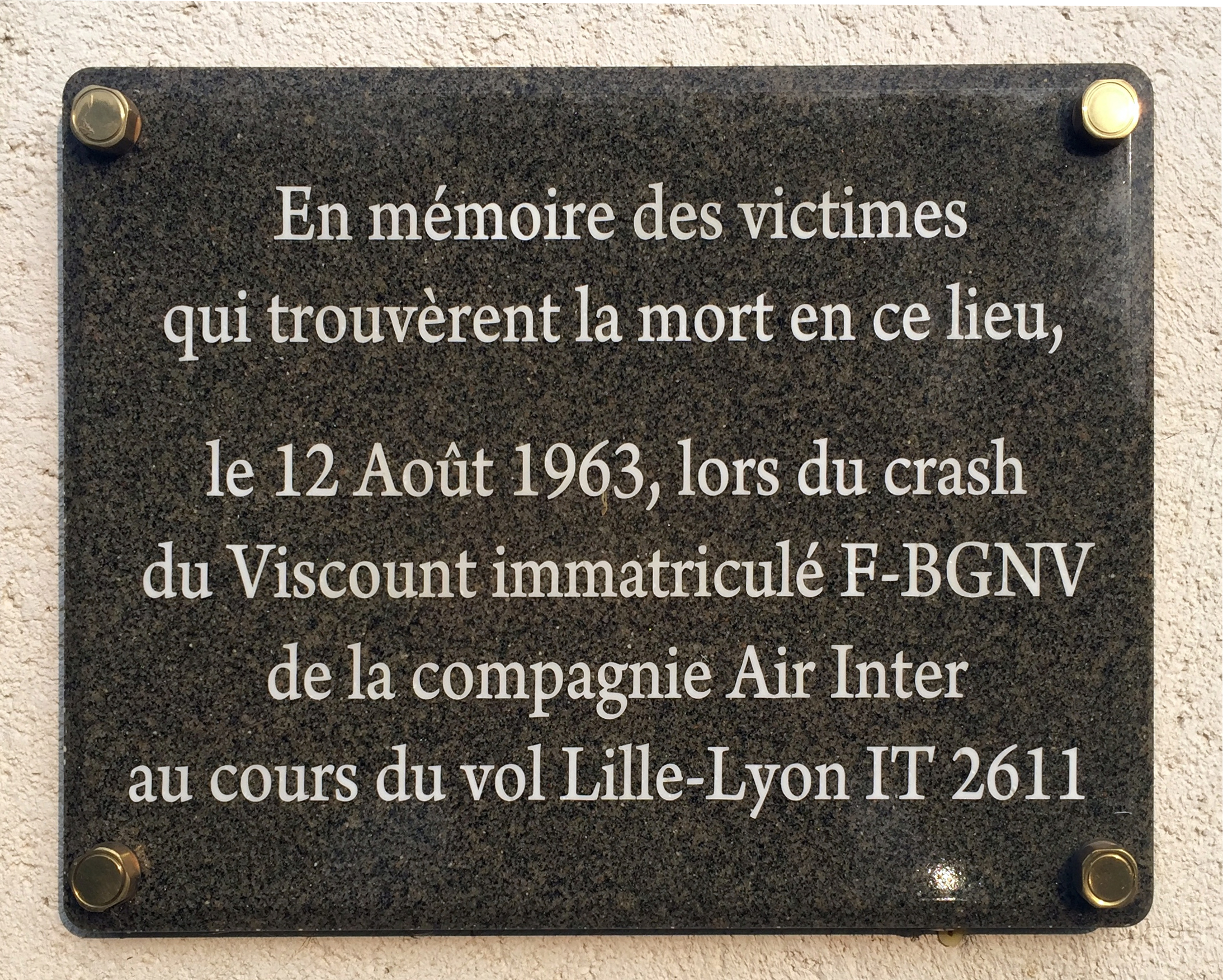
The commemorative plaque for the victims of the accident

On April 28, 2014, a commemorative plague was built in the locality named Le Molon.
