= Air Inter =

Semi-public domestic airline of France (1954–1997)

Air Inter - Air Inter Europe
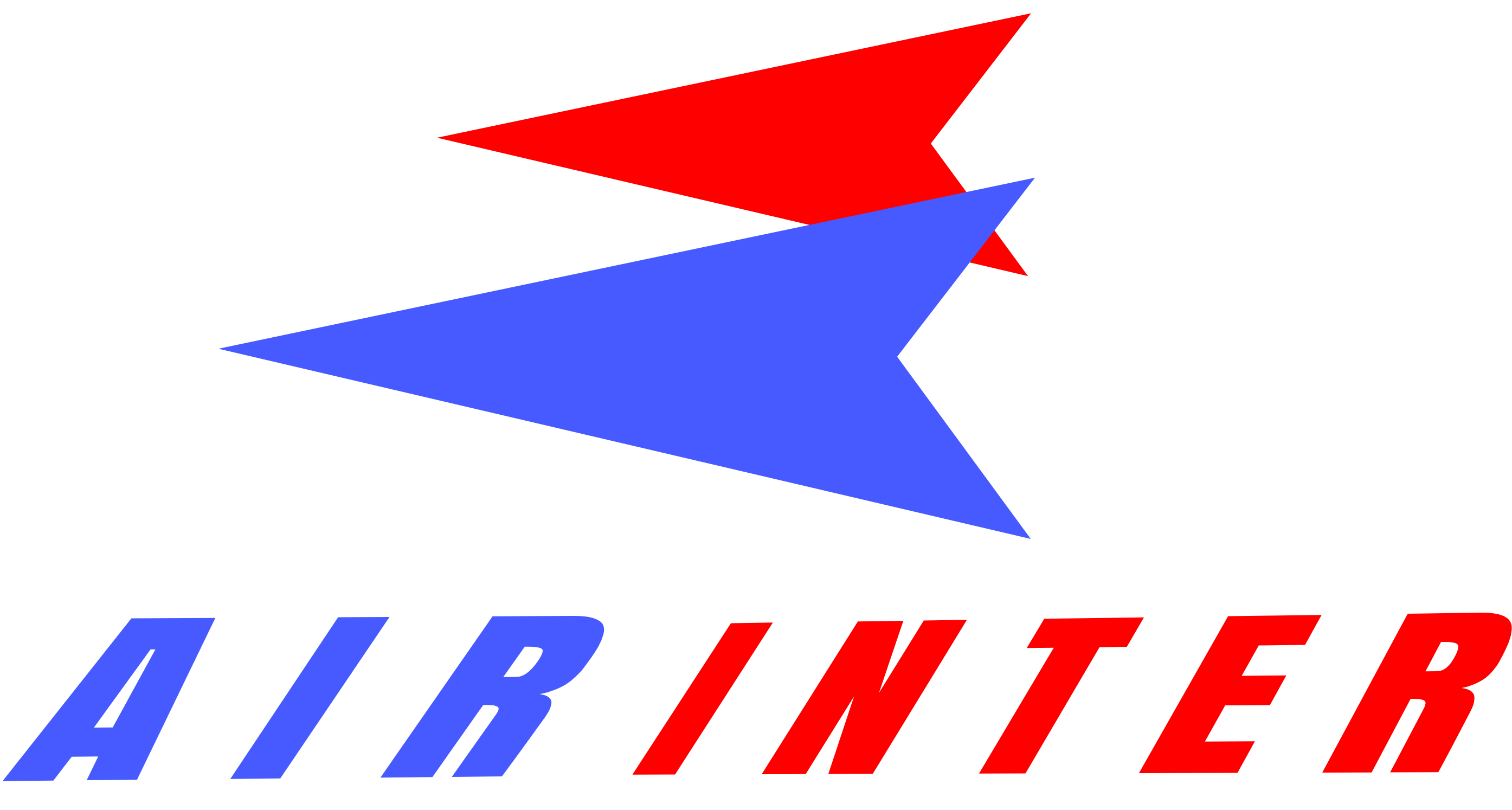

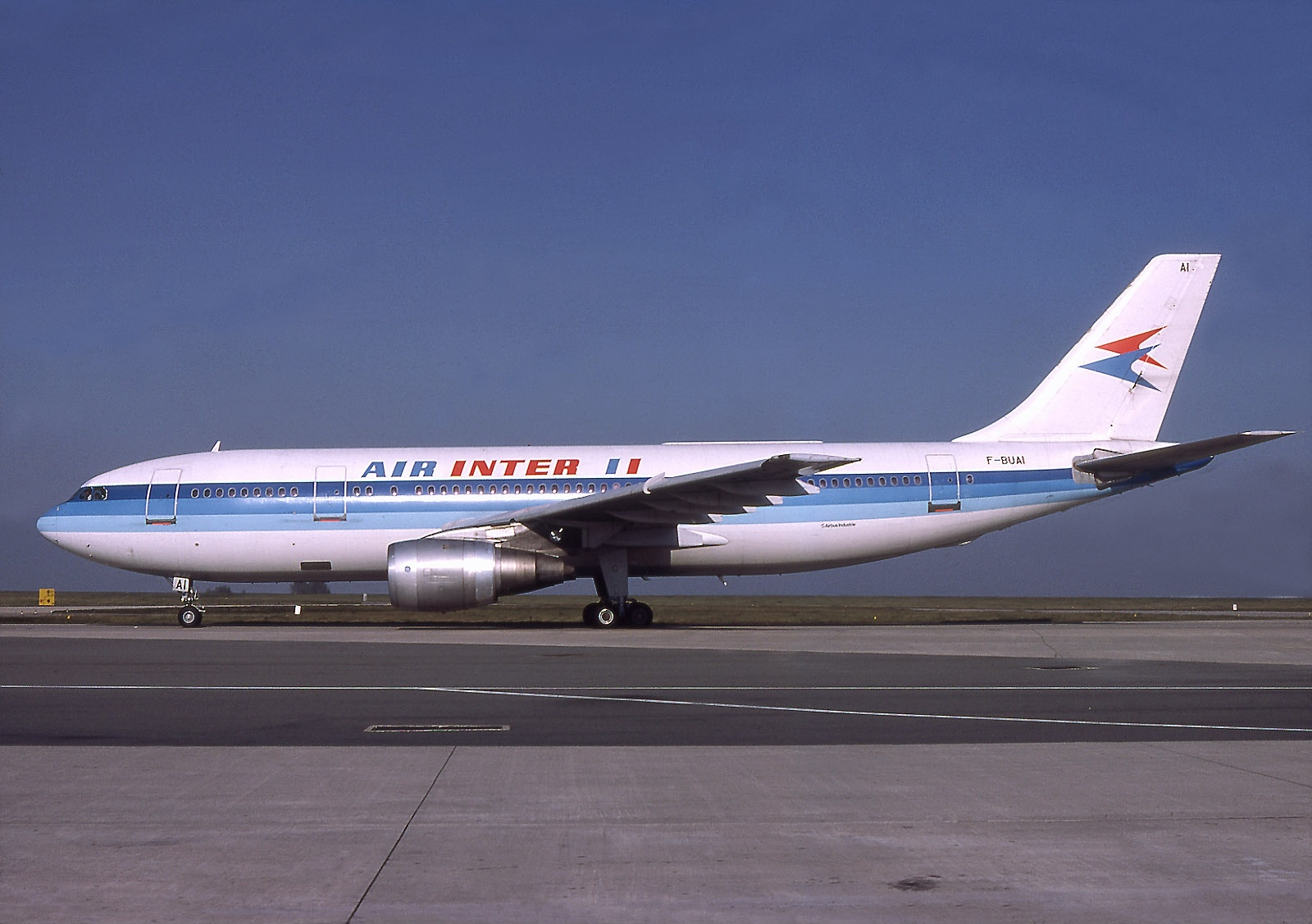
- Airbus A300B2
IATA	ICAO	Call sign
IT	ITF	AIR INTER
- Founded: 12 November 1954
- Commenced operations: 16 March 1958
- Ceased operations: 1 April 1997 (merged into Air France)
- Hubs: Orly Airport
- Frequent-flyer program: Fréquence Plus
- Parent company: Air France
- Headquarters: 1st arrondissement of Paris (earlier); Paray-Vieille-Poste, Essonne, France (later)

Air Inter (French pronunciation: [ɛʁ‿ɛ̃tɛʁ]) - legally registered corporate name Lignes Aériennes Intérieures - was a semi-public domestic airline in France that operated from 1958 until it merged with Air France in 1997. It was last headquartered in Paray-Vieille-Poste, Essonne. Earlier, it was headquartered in the 1st arrondissement of Paris. Air Inter was founded as a semi-public entity to provide efficient domestic air transport at the lowest fare level. Its financial backers included French public and private sector transport businesses in road, rail and air transport, as well as banks. Air France and SNCF, the state railway company, were Air Inter's two largest public sector shareholders, each holding 25% of the airline. Union de Transports Aériens (UTA) airline was the largest private investor. UTA initially held a 15% minority stake in Air Inter, subsequently increased to 36%, becoming the largest single shareholder.

Air Inter was incorporated on 12 November 1954 but was a "paper airline" for the next four years. It operated the first commercial flight between Paris and Strasbourg on 16 March 1958 but all scheduled operations were halted in the following Autumn. After a period of reorganization the airline started regular commercial services on 6 June 1960. The company established its operational and engineering base at Paris-Orly Airport, where its flights were concentrated at Orly Ouest (Orly Airport's West Terminal).

On 12 January 1990, Air Inter, together with UTA and Air France, became part of an enlarged Air France Group, which in turn became a subsidiary of Groupe Air France. Following an operational merger with Air France and UTA, on 1 January 1996 Air Inter changed its trading name to Air Inter Europe. On 1 April 1997, the airline was fully absorbed into Air France and also ceased to exist as a legal entity within Groupe Air France.

== History ==
=== The beginning ===
On 23 February 1960, France's Ministry of Public Works and Transport decided to transfer Air France's domestic monopoly to Air Inter. This provided the impetus to enlarge scheduled services within metropolitan France, as well as between the mainland and Corsica island. Though a private sector company because of its limited liability status, Air Inter was compelled to operate unprofitable minor internal routes to justify the domestic monopoly on profitable routes from and to Paris.

Air Inter primarily operated high-frequency scheduled domestic flights from Paris Orly to cities in metropolitan France, principally Lyon, Marseille, Nice, Toulouse, Bordeaux, Strasbourg and Mulhouse. Following the opening of Charles de Gaulle Airport close to the northern Paris suburb of Roissy-en-France and the transfer of the bulk of Air France's international operations from Orly starting in 1974, as well as the simultaneous transfer of UTA's Le Bourget-based operations to that airport, Air Inter began to operate these routes from Charles de Gaulle as well (with the exception of Nice) to feed domestic passengers into those airlines' international networks.

Air Inter also linked Orly with additional second and third-tier provincial French towns as well as with all three commercial airports of Corsica (Ajaccio, Bastia, Calvi). The airline operated regional domestic scheduled routes between major French cities as well. Many of Air Inter's routes serving smaller towns were later contracted to TAT. During the early 1990s, prior to the liberalisation of the internal air market in the European Union (EU), together with Air France, UTA and TAT, Air Inter was a pillar of the French air transport industry.

=== Domestic expansion and challenges ===
It had a large share of the domestic market and was the only airline flying most of the domestic trunk routes within metropolitan France on a regular scheduled basis, especially from and to Paris. The exceptions were Paris-Nice and Paris-Basel/Mulhouse. It competed against Air France's in Paris-Charles de Gaulle—Nice and Paris-Orly Airport—Nice flights. Air Inter competed head-on with Swissair, the former Swiss flag carrier, between Paris-Charles de Gaulle and Basel/Mulhouse. The difference between Air Inter and Swissair services on this route was that the former's passengers used the terminal at Basel/Mulhouse airport through the domestic channel that connected the airport to the French city of Mulhouse, whereas the latter's used the international channel that linked the airport with the city of Basel, in Switzerland. For this reason, Air Inter's flights were categorised as domestic while Swissair's were international. In addition, UTA had limited rights to carry passengers, cargo and mail on the internal legs of its long-haul services, between Paris Charles de Gaulle and Lyon, Marseille, Nice as well as Bordeaux. However, flights were too infrequent to pose a threat to Air Inter.

SNCF, one of Air Inter's two largest public sector shareholders, was also the company's main competitor on domestic trunk routes inside France. This intensified when from 1981 SNCF began high-frequency high-speed train (TGV) services on purpose-built tracks. The launch of TGV services between Paris and Lyon, one of Air Inter's busiest as well as shortest routes, led to a reduction in frequency and the use of smaller aircraft. The only other domestic air routes on which Air Inter competed with Air France in the pre-liberalisation years were routes linking the mainland with Corsica island.

In 1977, Air Inter purchased a 20% stake from Air France in the latter's charter affiliate Air Charter International, in return for ceasing to be a rival supplier of charter airline seats in the French inclusive tour market. Annual passenger numbers on Air Inter's domestic scheduled network grew steadily from 2,4 million in 1970 to 5,7 in 1980 to 8,6 in 1981 to 21 million, actually beating Air France one year. This established the firm as the largest scheduled domestic airline in Europe. Air Inter was also one of the few European ultra short-haul, mainline scheduled operators to be profitable most of the time and was a forerunner of today's low-cost airlines in Europe. Fares were lower than domestic ones elsewhere in Europe and competing with rail fares, with short turnarounds (35 minutes for a full 314-seat A300 was common), no seat allocation, no frills service on board and minimum crews.

=== Expansion of competitors ===
However the situation changed in the following years. In 1987 Nouvelles Frontières and Corsair were entitled to fly domestic routes up to seven destinations. In 1990 eight "hub-and-spoke" air links were opened to any other French airline, Air Liberté, AOM, and TAT being the most aggressive. In that same year Air France bought UTA through which it took over 35,8% of Air Inter and by consequence controlling more than 75% of the air carrier capital. The sale of controlling stakes in Air Inter and UTA to Air France, as well as the integration of both into the latter, was part of a French government plan to create an unified, national carrier with the economies of scale and global reach to counter threats from the liberalisation of the EU's internal air transport market.

On 1 January 1995, Air Inter lost its monopoly on the domestic trunk routes from Paris Orly. From that day, any EU-based rival was free to compete on these routes, without restrictions on capacity, frequency or fares. From June 6, the company applies a discount of 100 French Francs (€uros 23.78 - 2023 exchange rate) per ticket regardless of the initial fare or destination. The competitors lined up. Because of this at the end of the year the air carrier thought it had lost 1,3 million passengers.

On 1 January 1996 the air carrier merged into the newly established Air France Europe, which integrated all Air France medium-haul assets and which adopted Air Inter Europe brand . In June, 18 unprofitable routes were closed. In November, La Navette (the shuttle) service was launched from Paris Orly to Toulouse, as well as to Marseille, Nice, Bordeaux, and Montpellier. The idea was to offer flights throughout the day at a high frequency: one flight per hour during off-peak hours and one flight every 30 minutes during peak hours. After this phase, nothing significant happened until the complete and definitive merger into Air France, which took place on 1 April 1997.

== Fleet ==
Air Inter's presence on the market was of considerable importance for several major airframe manufacturers and their products. It began with the Vickers Viscount, for which the airline, along with its compatriot Air France, was a main customer. The airline contributed to the spread of the Nord 262 and was also a major customer of the Fokker F27. As for the first French flagship - the Sud Aviation (later Aérospatiale) SE-210 Caravelle III, Air Inter pioneered Category 3 all-weather landing system and started operating Category 3 minima. Air Inter was also a launch customer for the Dassault Mercure, the French answer to the Boeing 737, but which had absolutely no diffusion. Anyway it was upgraded with enhanced head-up displays. The Mercure entered service on June 4, 1974. Dassault Aviation's inability to find other customers resulted in the French government granting Air Inter a subsidy of £10,775,000. This helped the airline bear the financial burden of operating an "orphan fleet" of only ten aircraft. In addition to these aircraft, the airline had the prototype converted to airline standard as well. It was withdrawn from service in 1995, after 20 years' uninterrupted service.

Air Inter was an early operator of the Airbus A300, the European consortium's first commercial jetliner and the airline's first widebodied aircraft. The fleet reached 22 aircraft at its peak with aircraft being acquired in the second hand market up to 1992. Air Inter was also a launch customer, together with Air France and British Caledonian, of the Airbus A320 (eventually building a fleet of 33 of the 320 variant alone). The airline aircraft were all equipped with head-up displays.

In the last years of operation, other Airbus products were added to the fleet: Airbus A319, Airbus A321, Airbus A330 and, for less crowded routes, even some Fokker F100s.

Listed below are the main aircraft types that were part of Air Inter's fleet:

- Airbus A300 B2/B4 series
- Airbus A320 100/200 series
- Airbus A321-100
- Airbus A330-300
- Dassault Mercure
- Douglas DC-3/C-47
- Fokker F27 Friendship 500 series
- Fokker 100
- Nord 262
- Sud Aviation Caravelle III series/12 series ("Super 12")
- Vickers Viscount 700 series.

=== Air Inter & Air Inter Europe photographic gallery ===
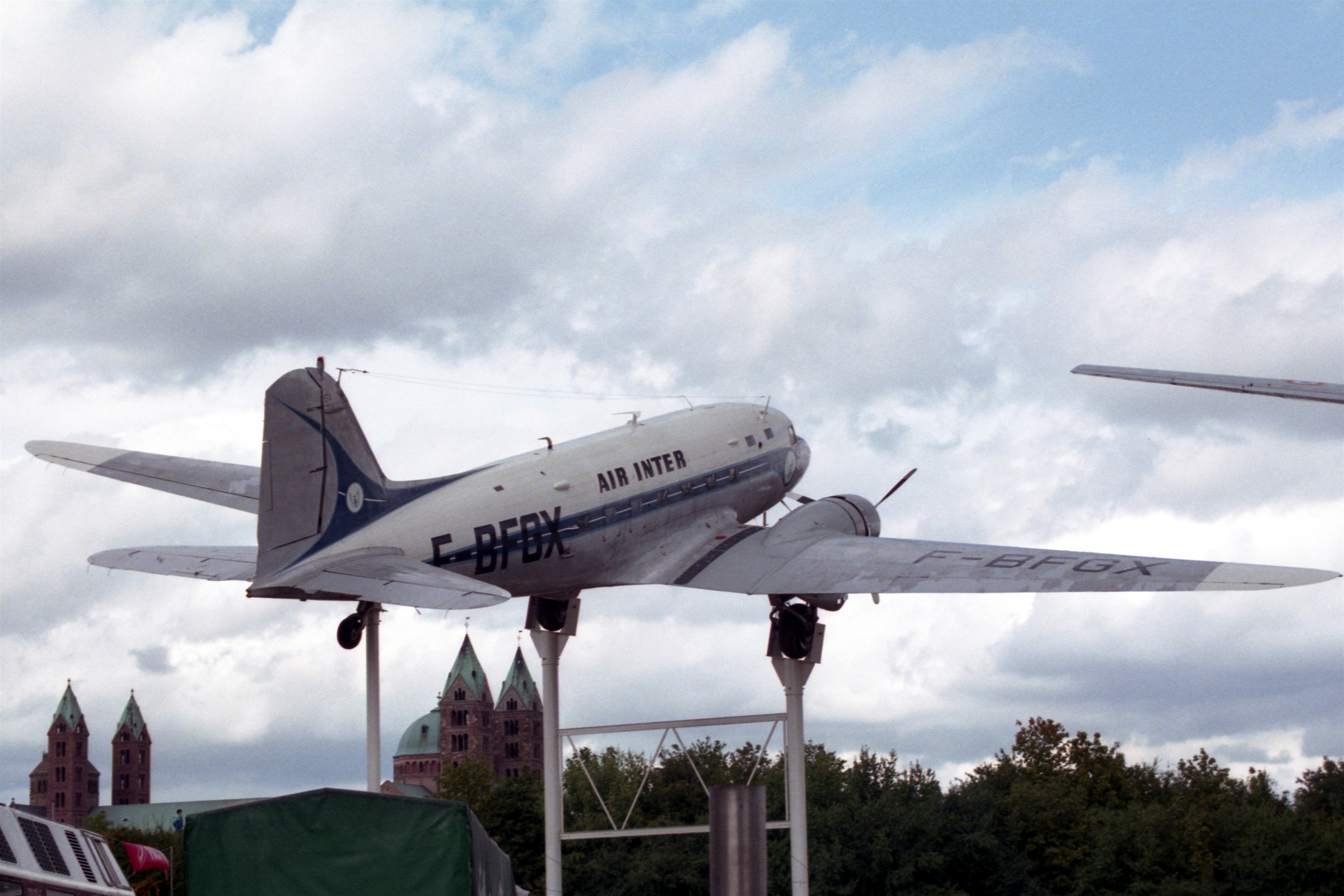
Preserved Douglas DC-3

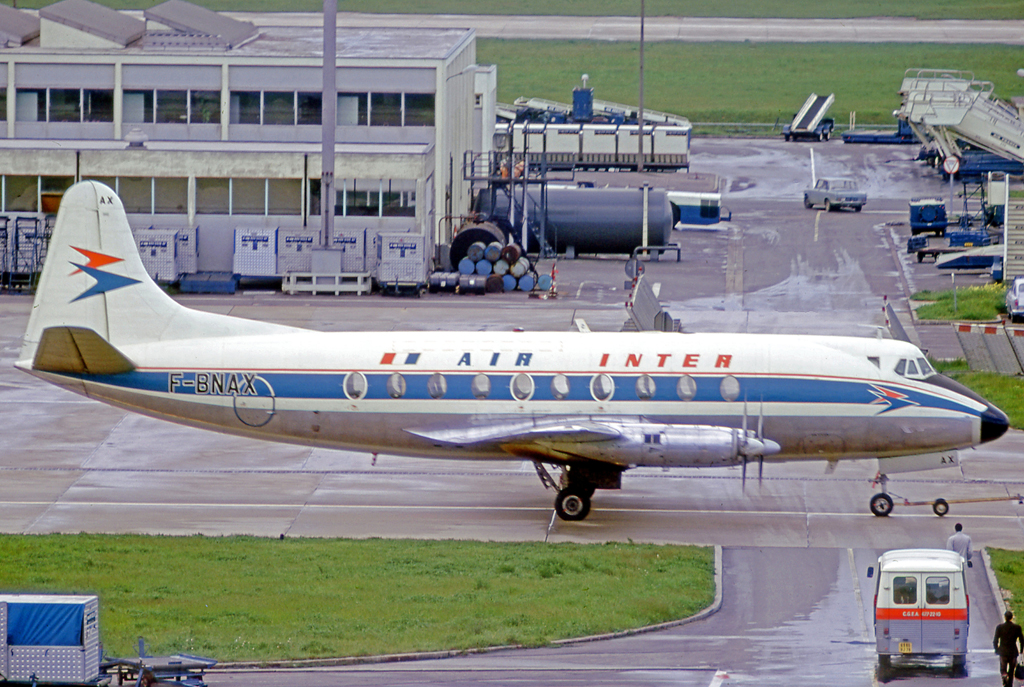
Air Inter Vickers Viscount 700 at Paris Orly in 1973

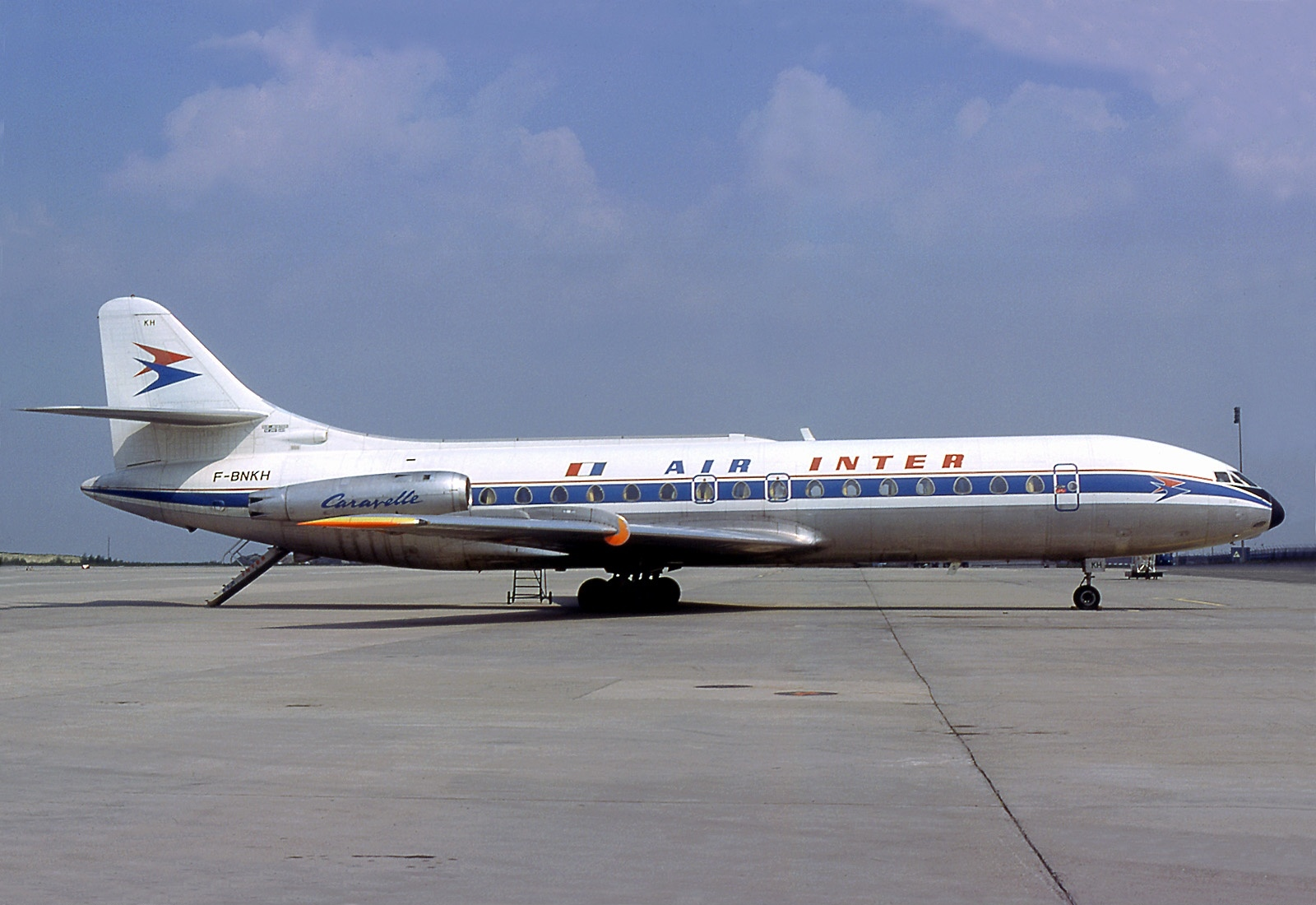
Sud Aviation SE-210 Caravelle III

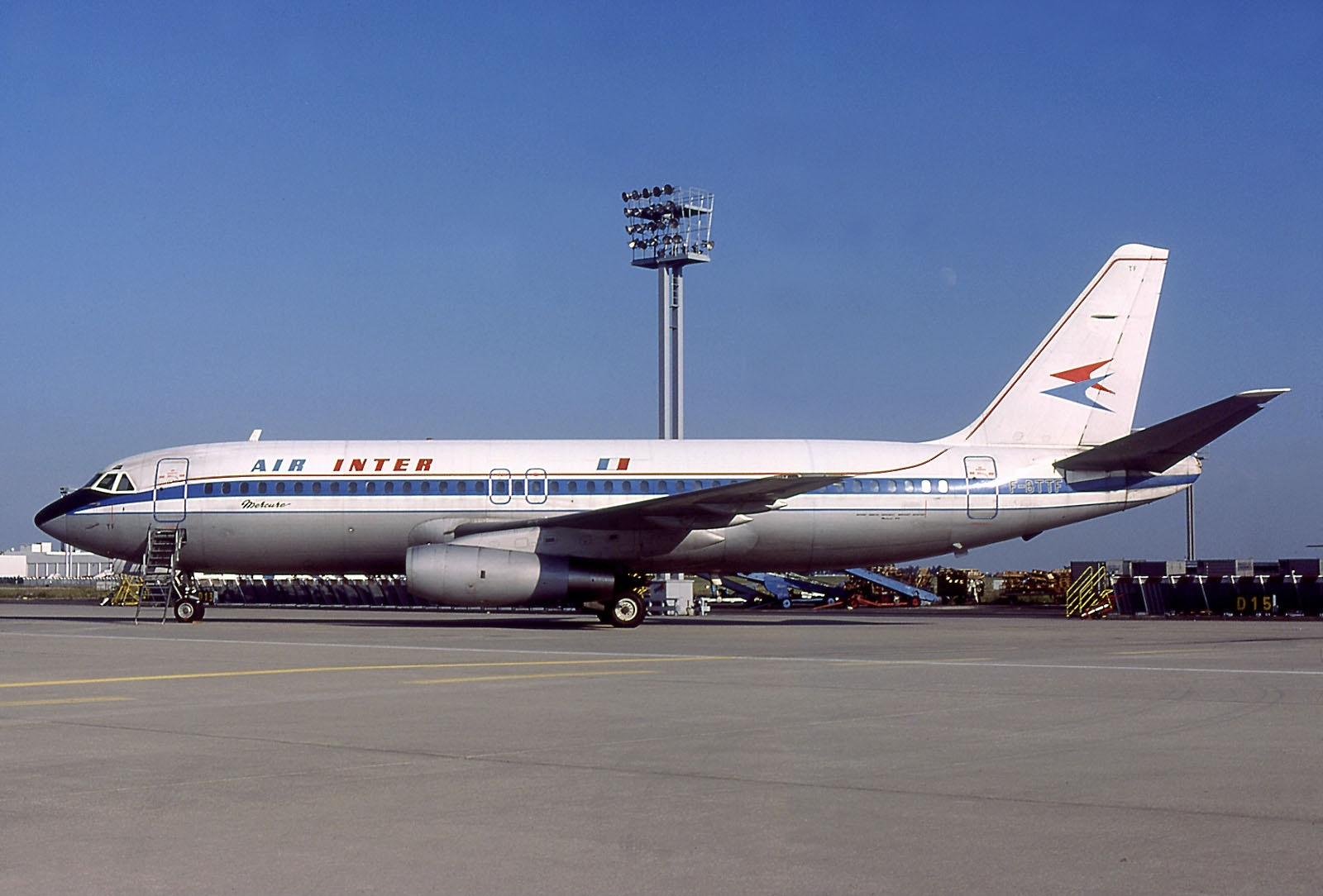
Dassault Mercure 100

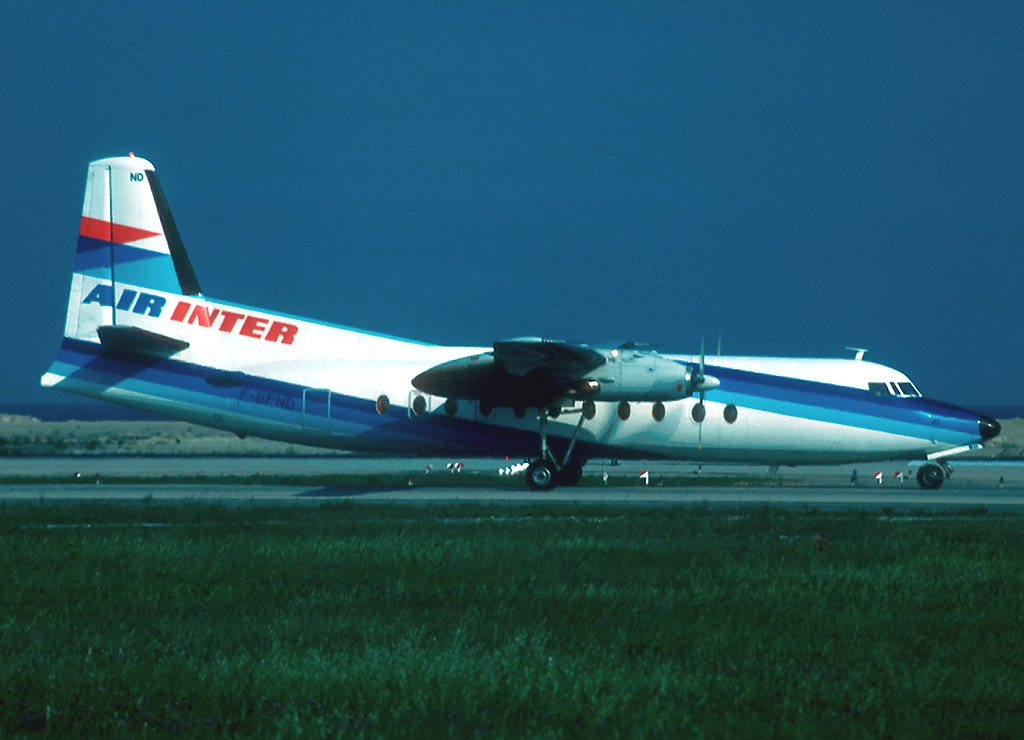
Fokker F27 Friendship 500 series

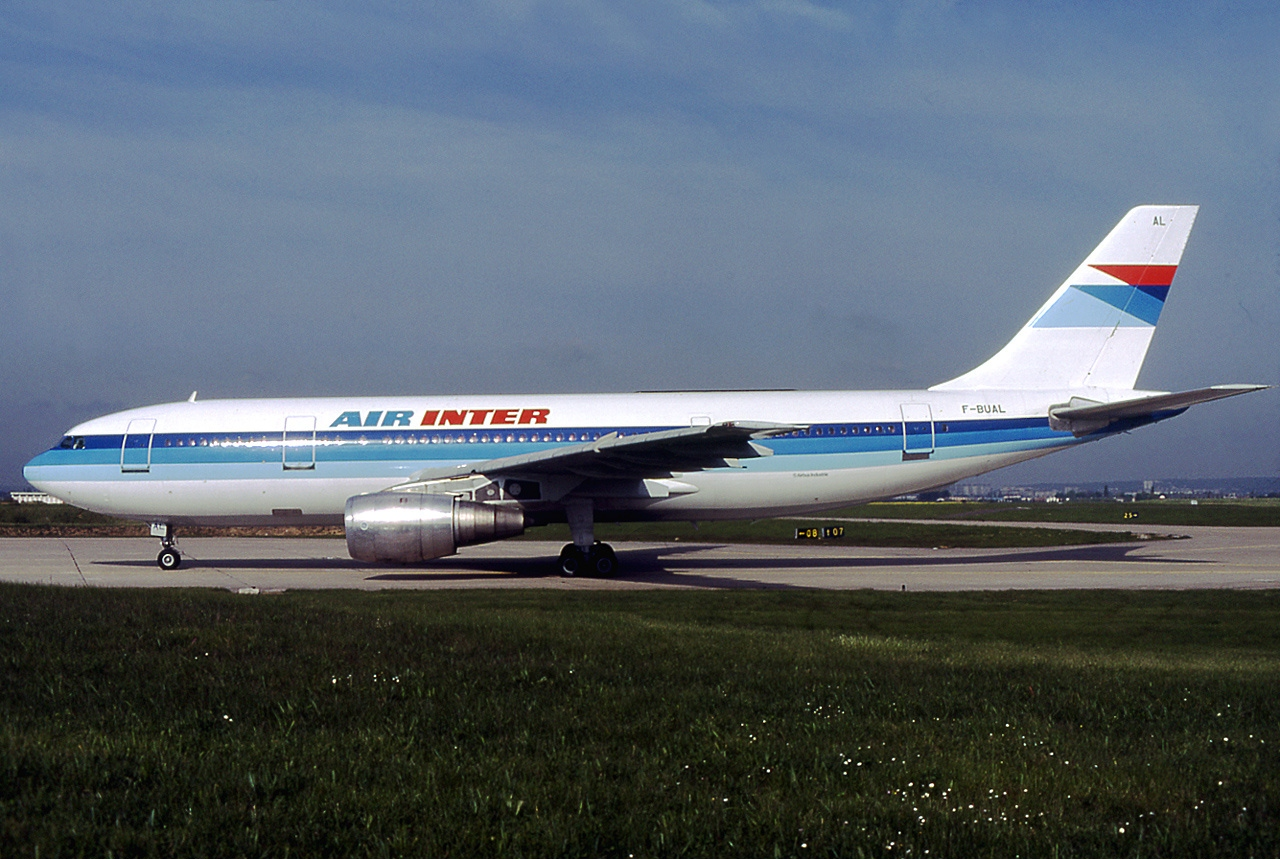
Airbus A300 B4

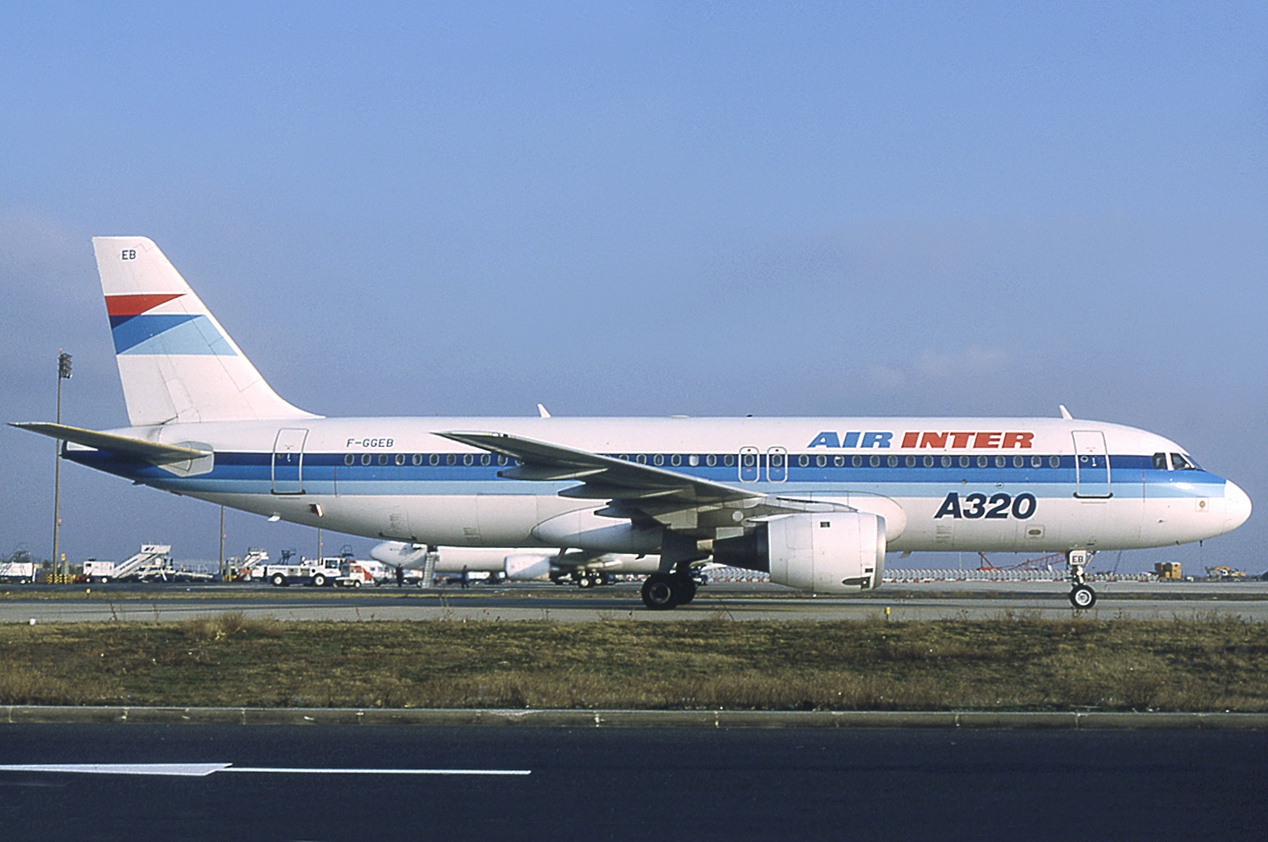
Airbus A320

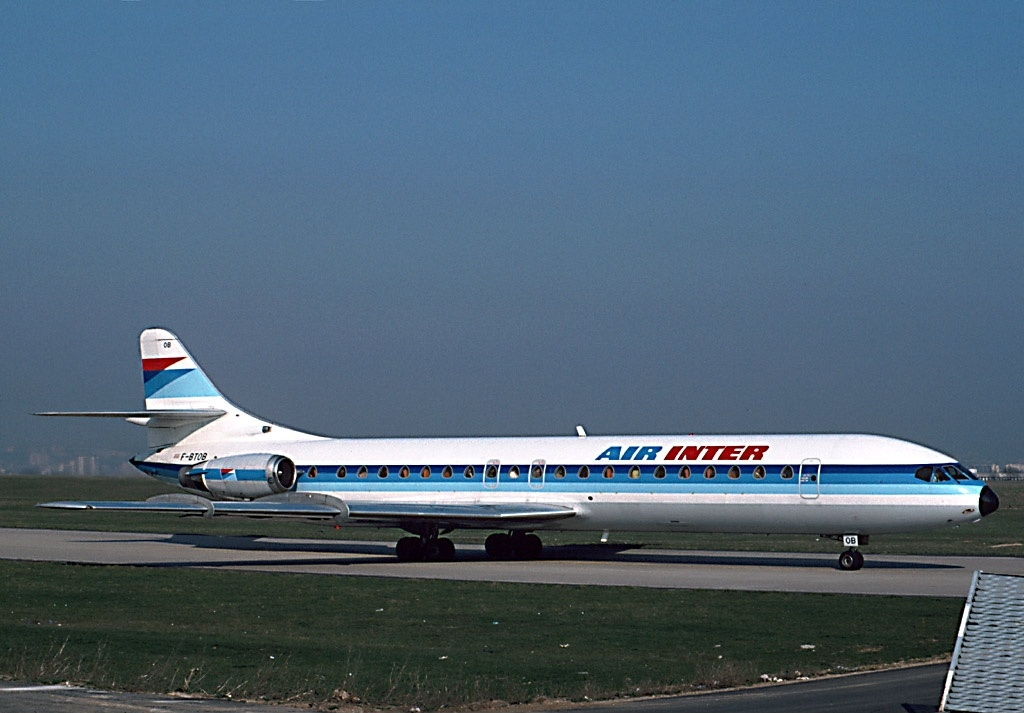
Sud Aviation SE-210 Caravelle 12

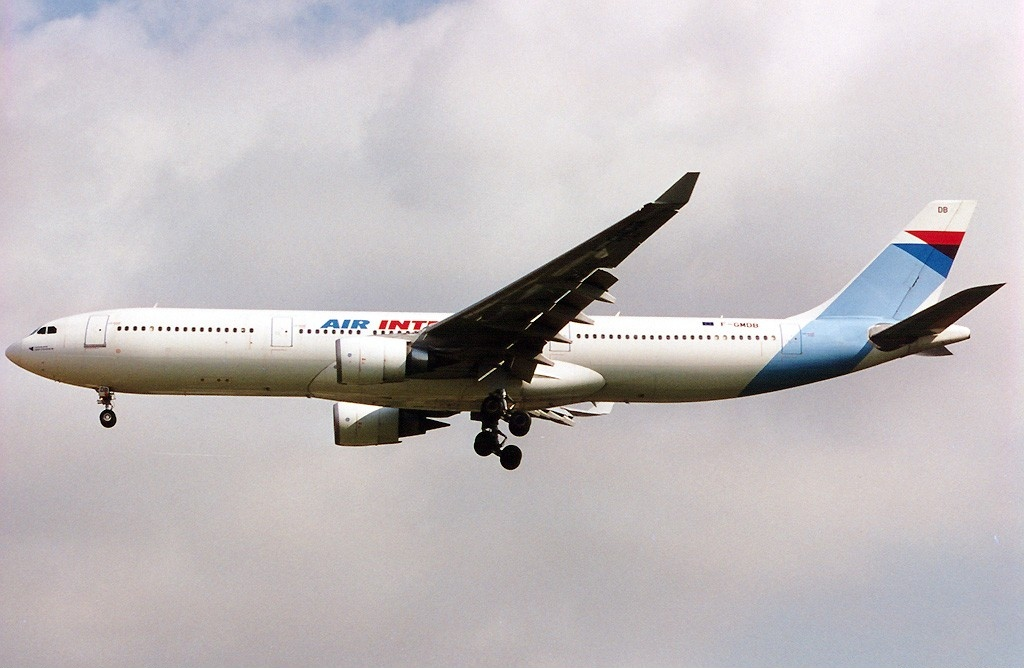
Airbus A330-300

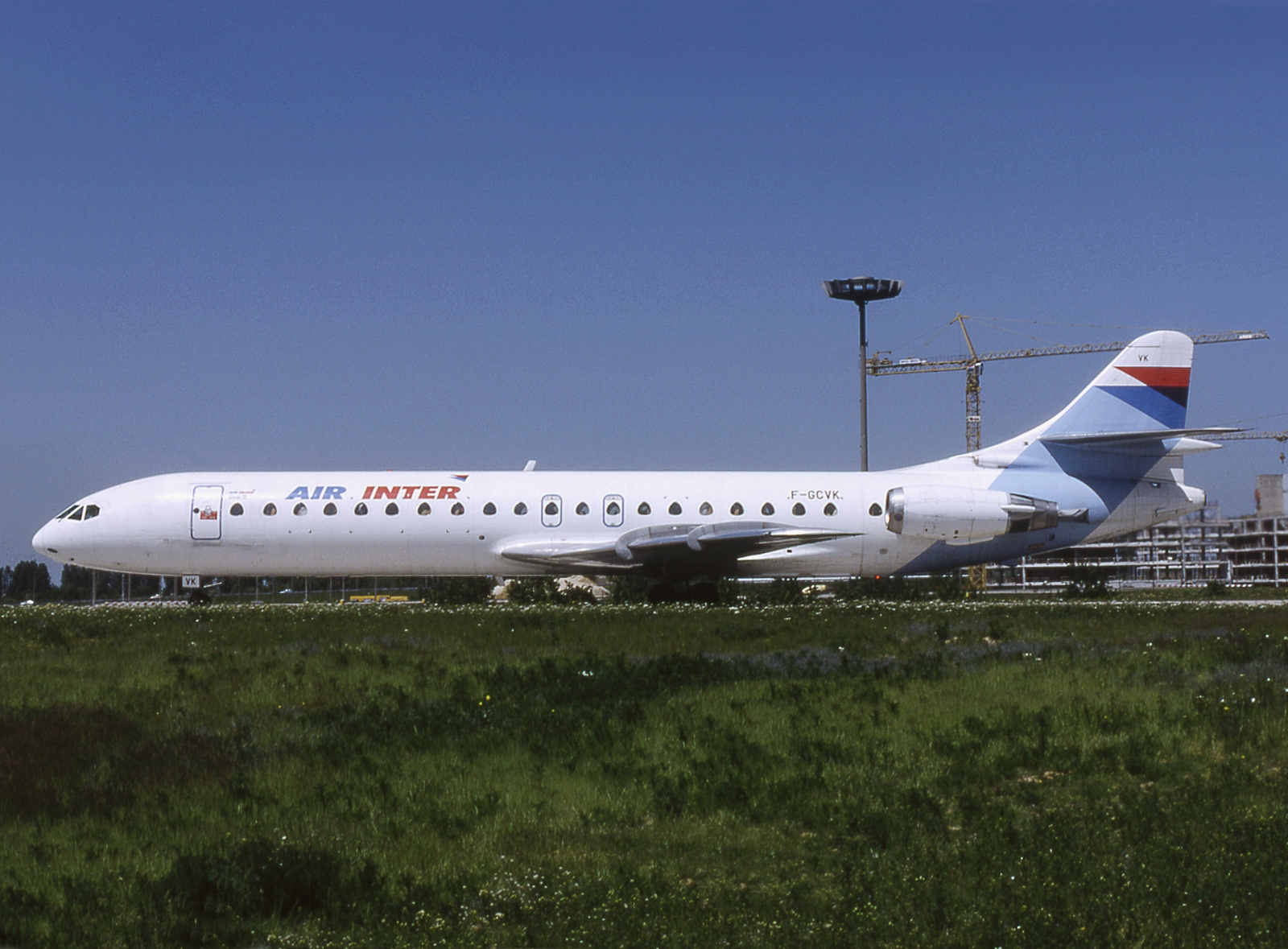
Sud Aviation SE-210 Caravelle 12

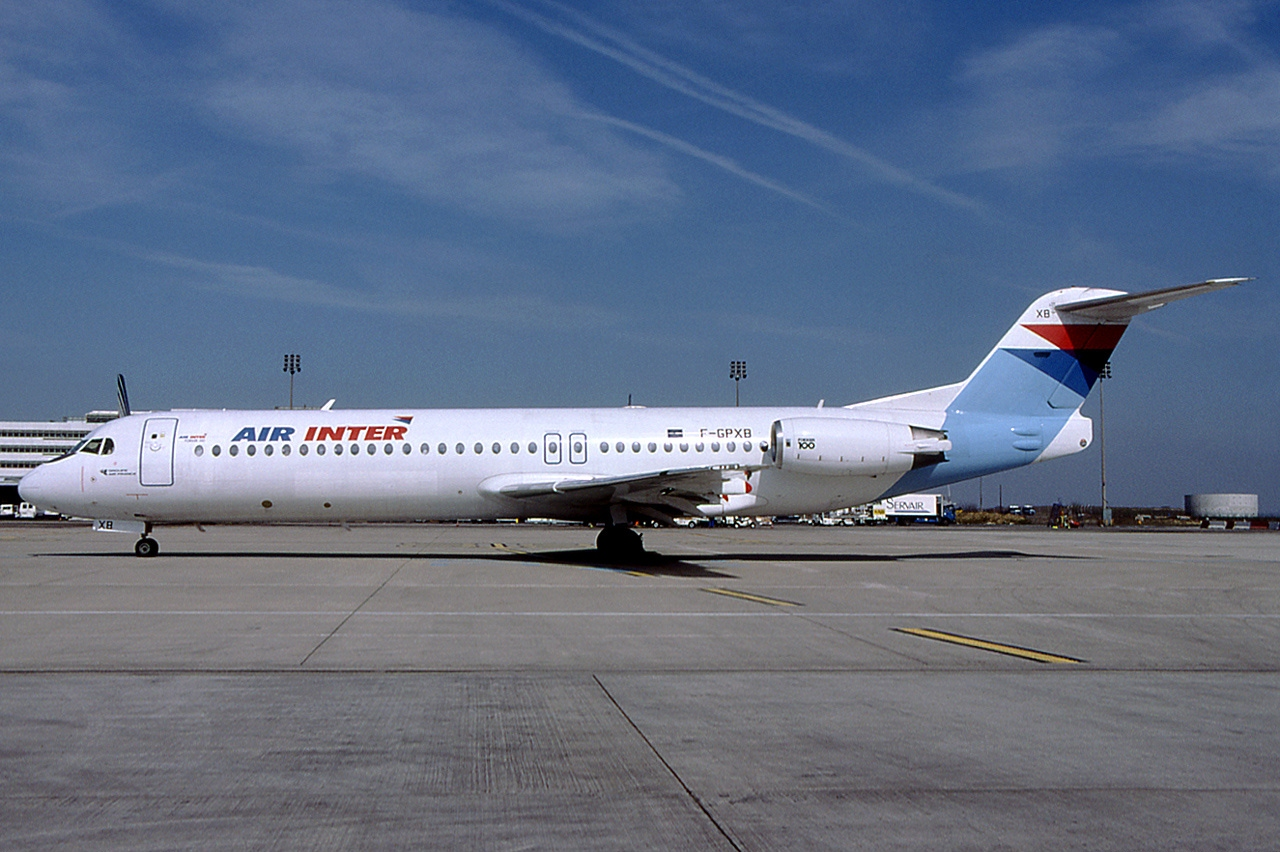
Fokker 100

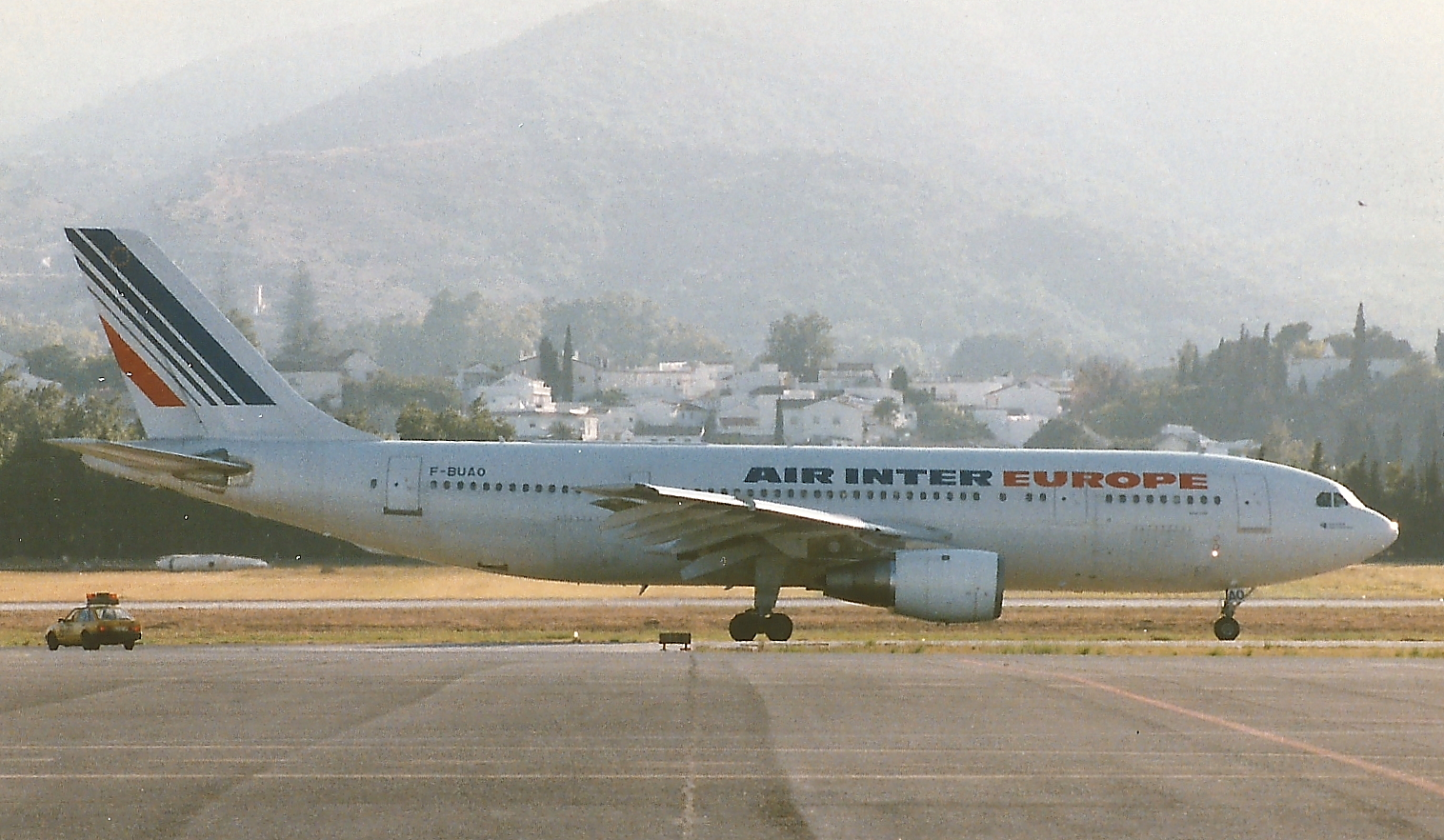
Airbus A300

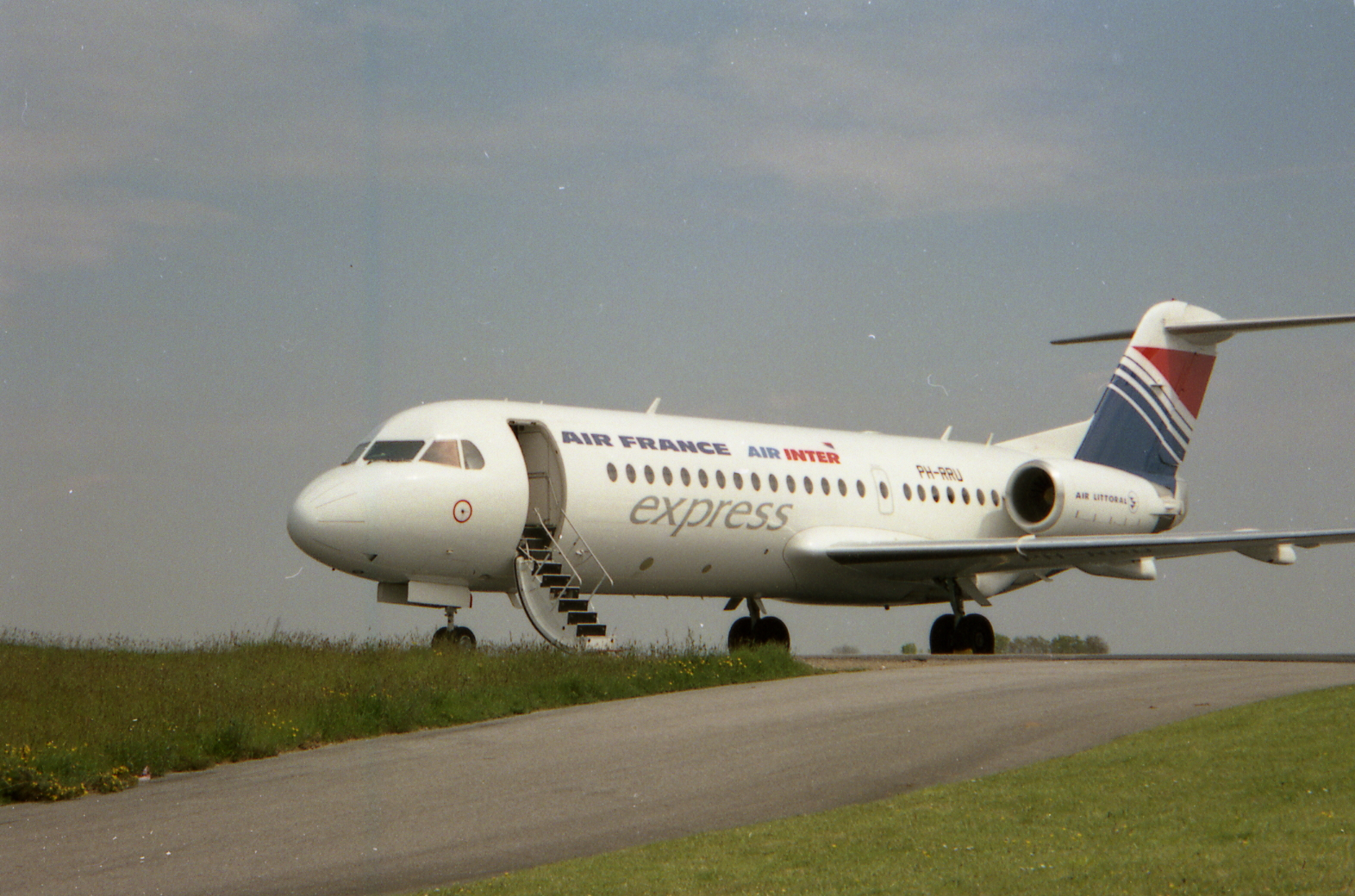
Fokker 70 in 1996 with Air France and Air Inter titles

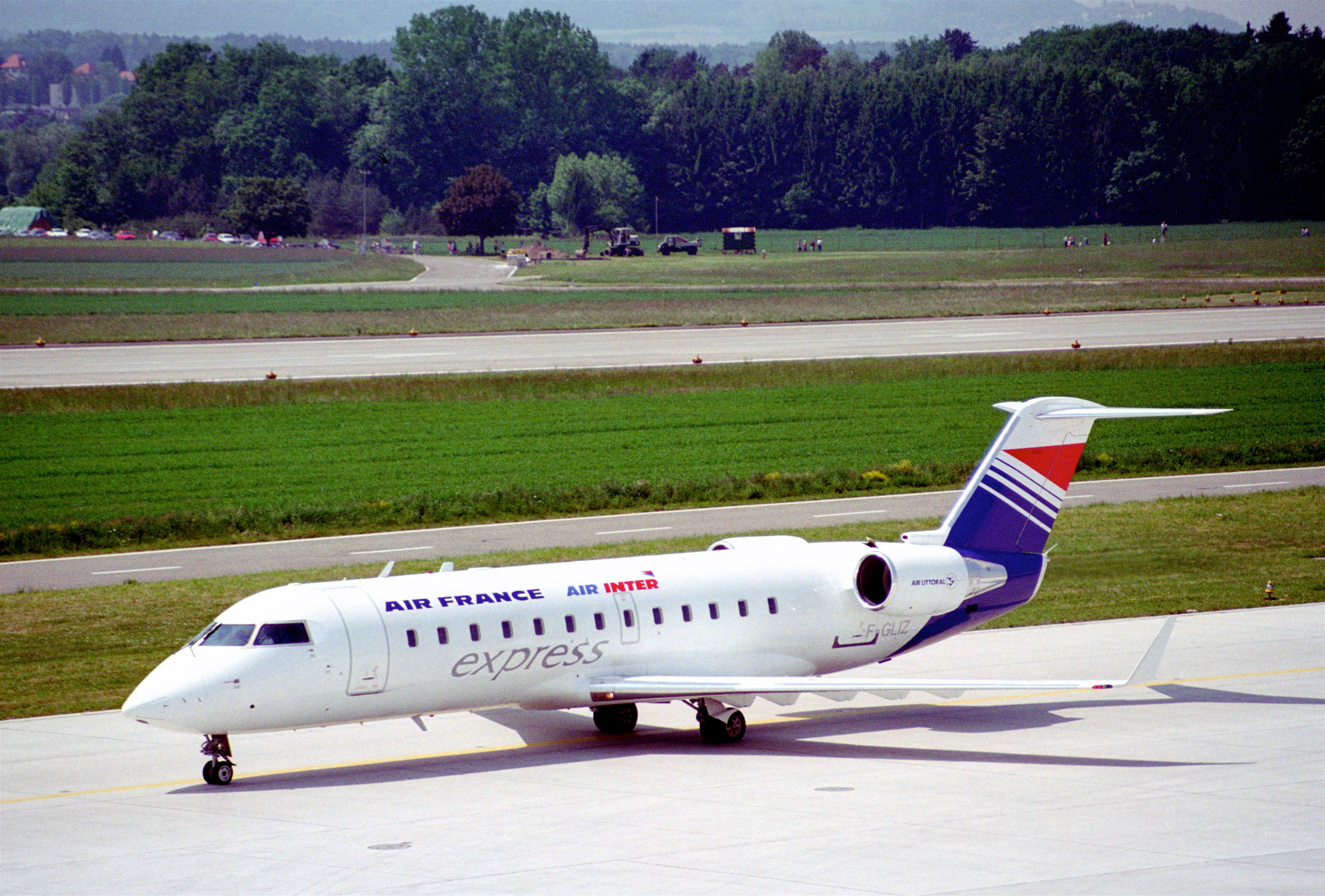
Canadair CRJ100 operated by Air Littoral

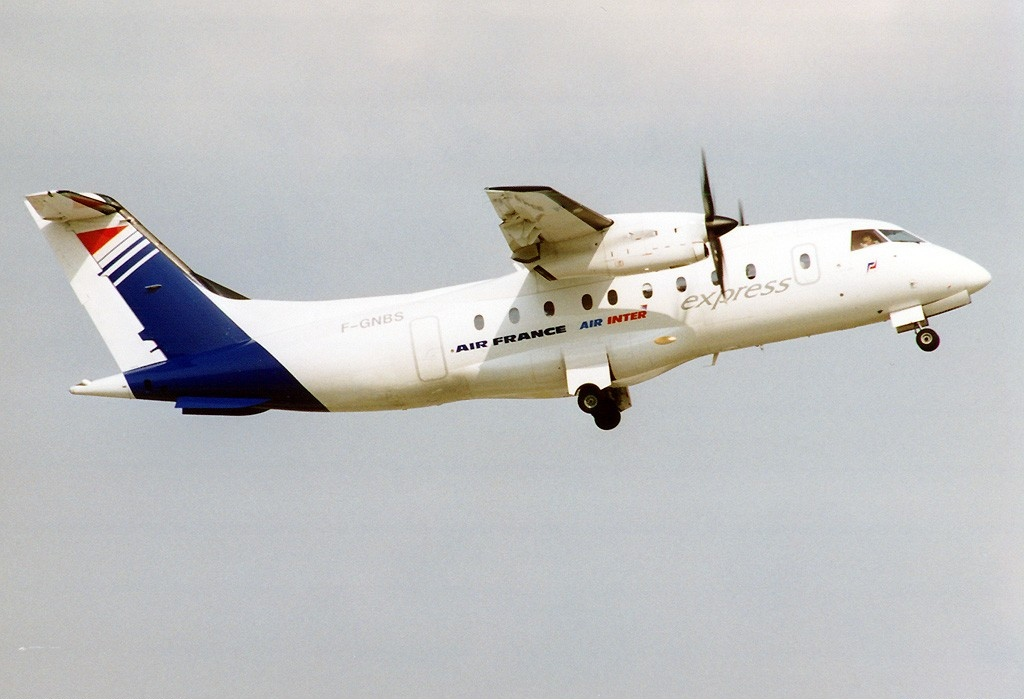
Dornier 328-110 operated by Proteus Airlines

== Subsidiaries ==
The creation of Intercargo Services (ICS) was in response to a pressing request from TAT Express to Air Inter. At the end of August 1986, Air Inter's management decided to create a specialized subsidiary called ICS for Intercargo Services. Air Inter invested 15 million francs and the Masurel group 5 million francs, because it owned EAS Europe Aéro Service, the company that was to supply the freighter aircraft and provide their maintenance. Two Vickers Vanguard were the first aircraft used. On February 17, 1987, at 11:30 p.m., the first mail flight operated by ICS took place between Paris-Orly airport and Montpellier.

On January 29, 1988, there was a bad accident: a Vanguard bound to Paris-Orly crashed while taking off from Toulouse-Blagnac airport. On March 22, 1991, La Poste (French mail), Air Inter, Air France and TAT created the SEA-Société d'Exploitation Aéropostale, initially known as ICS-Inter Ciel Service. The company's aircraft, which now included Boeing 737 Quick Change, carried passengers during the day on Air France, Air Inter, Air Charter or, on rare occasions, Corsair behalf. At night, the seats were removed and the twin jetliners were operated on La Poste, Chronopost or even a national newspaper behalf. In 1995, TAT sold its shares and the shareholding was split between Air France and La Poste (which included Sofipost for 40% and Chronopost for 10%). Shortly after, the company was renamed Aéropostale, taking the same name of a historic and famous airline.

== Incidents and accidents ==
There were 12 recorded incidents/accidents involving Air Inter aircraft throughout 37 years of uninterrupted commercial operations, three of which were fatal. One of the other nine reported incidents included an aircraft hijacking, resulting in the loss of one life.

The airline's three fatal accidents were:

- On 12 August 1963, Air Inter Flight 2611, a Vickers Viscount 708 registered as F-BGNV, operating a scheduled flight from Lille to Lyon crashed while holding over Tramoyes at FL30 on the instructions of Lyon ATC, resulting in the deaths of 15 of the aircraft's 16 occupants (all four crew members and 11 out of 12 passengers) as well as one person on the ground. A storm forced the flight crew to request ATC permission to descend to FL25. In response, the crew received clearance for a straight-in approach to Lyon–Bron Airport's runway 17. Eyewitnesses reported the aircraft flying low in an easterly direction in the heart of the storm. The aircraft struck trees, the roof of a farmhouse and a telephone pole before coming to rest in a field. The investigation board cited exceptionally bad weather where the aircraft was instructed to hold, as well as a possibility of lightning dazzling the crew and causing temporary blindness or appreciably incapacitating both pilots.
- On 27 October 1972, Air Inter Flight 696Y, a Vickers Viscount 724 registered as F-BMCH, operating a scheduled night flight from Lyon to Clermont-Ferrand crashed into the Pic du Picon mountain 44 km east of Clermont-Ferrand airport at 1,000 ft killing 60 of the aircraft's 68 occupants, including all five crew and 55 of the 63 passengers. The accident was caused by the flight deck crew's failure to notice their plane's radio compass had shifted 180 degrees, most likely as a result of electrical discharges in rainfall blocking the signals emitted by Clermont-Ferrand's non-directional beacon (NDB), while being instructed to fly a holding pattern prior to receiving clearance to descend to 3,600 ft. This resulted in the crew's initiating their descent too early, which set the aircraft on a collision course with the mountain.
- On 20 January 1992, Air Inter Flight 148, operated by an Airbus A320-111 registered as F-GGED, crashed into a ridge near Mount Sainte-Odile in the Vosges mountains while on final approach to Strasbourg at the end of a scheduled flight from Lyon. This resulted in the deaths of 87 of the aircraft's occupants (five crew members, 82 passengers), the worst accident in company history. There were nine survivors (one crew member, eight passengers). The accident was caused by the aircraft's wrongly programmed Flight Control Unit (FCU), a consequence of the crew's failure to notice that the FCU was in [incorrect] vertical speed mode when programming the angle of descent (-3.3 [3.3 degrees]). The excessive descent (3,300 ft./minute instead of 800 ft./minute) took the aircraft below its minimum safe altitude. This resulted in the aircraft's striking trees and a 2,710 ft high ridge in the cloud-covered mountains.

The following was a notable, non-fatal incident:

- On 28 December 1971, Vickers Viscount (registration: F-BOEA) was damaged beyond economic repair at Clermont-Ferrand Aulnat Airport when it departed the runway on a training flight during a simulated failure of number 4 engine.
