= Dassault Mercure =

French twin engine narrow-body jet airliner built 1971–1975

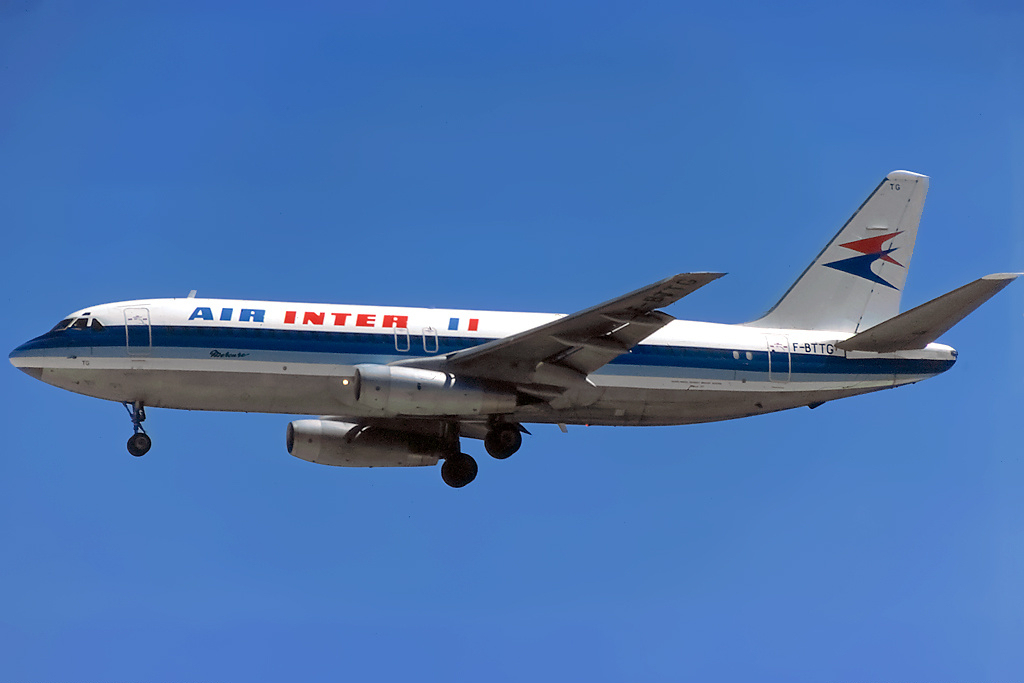
- Air Inter Dassault Mercure 100

General information
- Type: Narrow-body jet airliner
- National origin: France
- Manufacturer: Dassault Aviation
- Status: Retired
- Primary user: Air Inter
- Number built: 12

History
- Manufactured: 1971–1975
- Introduction date: 4 June 1974 with Air Inter
- First flight: 28 May 1971
- Retired: 29 April 1995

The Dassault Mercure is a twin-engined narrow-body jet-powered airliner developed and manufactured by French aircraft firm Dassault Aviation. According to Dassault, it was the first large-scale European cooperative civil aeronautics programme.

During 1967, the Mercure was proposed as a French competitor to the American Boeing 737. It was Dassault's first venture into the commercial jet airliner market, the company having traditionally built fighters and executive jets. On 28 May 1971, the prototype conducted its maiden flight, while the type entered service on 4 June 1974 with French airline Air Inter.

Attempts were made to market the type in the US, including partnerships with American manufacturers Douglas, Lockheed and General Dynamics, with the vision of producing it in the United States. However, the Mercure had very little success on the market, which has been attributed to several factors, primarily the decision to design the Mercure with a service-limiting lack of range in comparison to rival aircraft (less than half the range (Note: Dassault Mercure range: 2,084 kilometres (1,295 mi). Boeing 737-200 range: 4,800 kilometres (3,000 mi).) of the contemporary Boeing 737-200). As a consequence, there were only 12 aircraft constructed, all of which were built between 1971 and 1975. The Mercure performed its final flight in 1995.

== Development ==
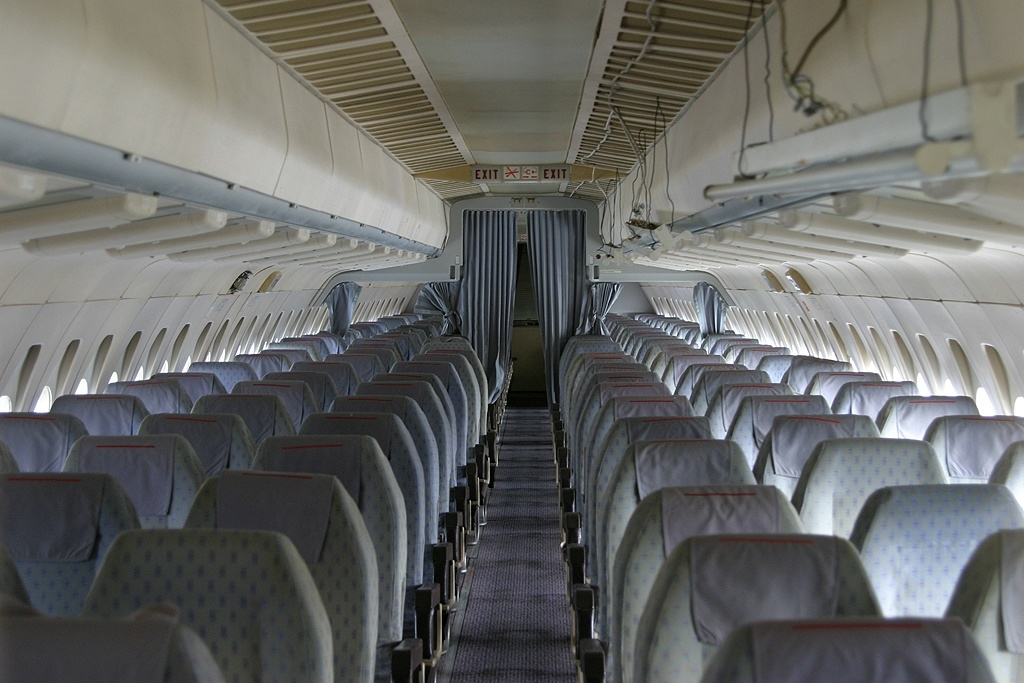
View of the aircraft's six-abreast cabin.

=== Engineering ===
During the mid-1960s, Marcel Dassault, the founder and owner of French aircraft company Dassault Aviation, as well as other parties such as the French Directorate General for Civil Aviation (DGAC), examined the civil aviation market and noticed that there was no existing aircraft that was intended specifically to serve low-distance air routes. Thus, it was found that there could be a prospective market for such an airliner, if it were to be developed. The DGAC was keen to promote a French equivalent to the popular American Boeing 737, and suggested the development of a 140-seat airliner to Dassault.

In 1967, with the issuing of backing by the French government, Dassault decided to commence work on its short-haul airliner concept. During 1968, the initial studies performed by the company's research team were orientated around a 110 to 120-seat airliner which was powered by a pair of rear-mounted Rolls-Royce Spey turbofan engines; as time went on, a specification for a 150-seat aircraft with a 1000-km range (540 nm) was developed. As envisioned, the new airliner would attack this market segment at the upper end with a 140-seat jetliner, contrasting against the 100-seat Boeing 737-100 and the 115-seat Boeing 737-200 variants then in production. In April 1969, the development programme was officially launched.

This aircraft was viewed as being a major opportunity for Dassault to demonstrate upon the civilian market its knowledge of high-speed aerodynamics and low-speed lift capability that had previously been developed in the production of a long line of jet fighters, such as the Ouragan, Mystère and Mirage aircraft. The French Government contributed 56 per cent of the programme's total development costs, which was intended to be repaid by Dassault via a levy on sales of the airliner. The company also financed the initiative with $10 million of its own money, as well as being mainly responsible for costs related to manufacture. The program cost was $75 million and the unit cost $6 million in 1971, raised to US$6.5 million in 1972.

According to aerospace publication Flight International, the design of the new airliner had been shaped by Dassault's "philosophy of aiming the aircraft at a corner of the market which it believes existing types do not adequately serve". Marcel Dassault decided to name the aircraft Mercure (French for Mercury). "Wanting to give the name of a god of mythology, I found of them only one which had wings with its helmet and ailerons with its feet, from where the Mercure name.." said Marcel Dassault. Extremely modern computer tools for the time were used to develop the wing of the Mercure 100. Even though it was larger than the Boeing 737, the Mercure 100 was the faster of the two. In June 1969, a full scale mockup was presented during the Paris Airshow at Le Bourget Airport. On 4 April 1971, the prototype Mercure 01 rolled out of Dassault's Bordeaux-Merignac plant.

=== Flight testing ===
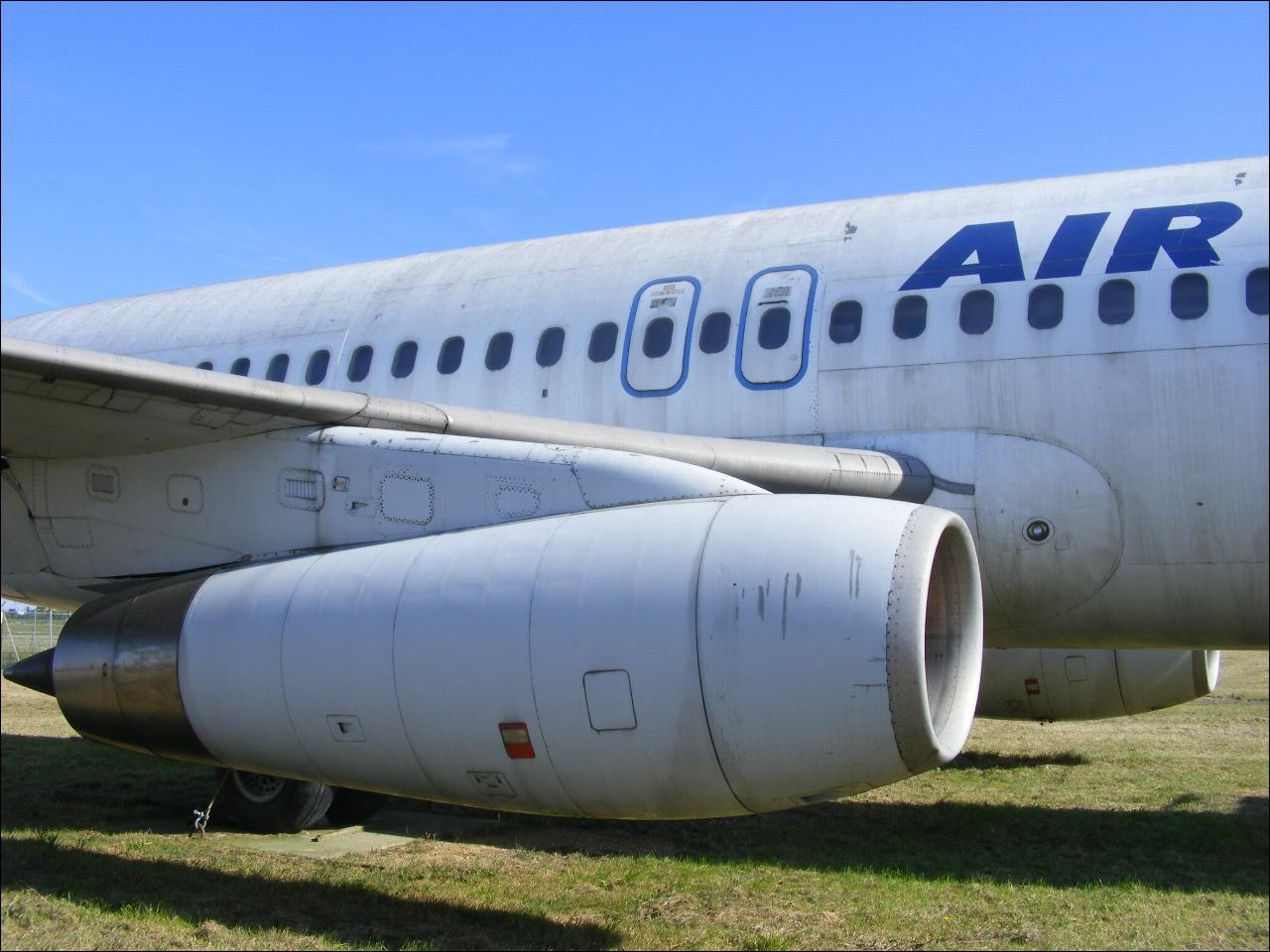
View of one the Pratt & Whitney JT8D nacelle.

On 28 May 1971, the maiden flight of the first prototype, powered by a pair of Pratt & Whitney JT8D-11 turbofan engines, capable of generating up to 6,800 kgf (15,000 lbf) of thrust, took place at Mérignac. On 7 September 1972, the second prototype, which was powered by a pair of Pratt & Whitney JT8D-15 engines, which would be used on all subsequent Mercures built, flew for the first time. On 19 July 1973, the first production aircraft conducted its maiden flight. On 12 February 1974, the Mercure received its Type certificate and, on 30 September 1974, was certified for Category IIIA approach all-weather automatic landing (minimum visibility = 500 ft, minimum ceiling = 50 ft). The Mercure 100 was also the first commercial airliner to be operated by a 100% female crew on one of its flights.

Dassault tried to attract the interest of major airlines and several regional airlines, touting the Mercure 100 as a replacement for the Douglas DC-9. A few airlines showed some initial interest but only Air Inter, a domestic French airline, placed an order. This lack of interest was due to several factors, including the devaluation of the dollar and the oil crisis of the 1970s, but mainly because of the Mercure's operating range – suitable for domestic European operations but unable to sustain longer routes; at maximum payload, the aircraft's range was only 1,700 kilometres (1,100 mi). Consequently, the Mercure 100 achieved no foreign sales. With a total of only ten sales with one of the prototypes refurbished and sold as the 11th Mercure to Air Inter, the airliner represented one of the worst failures of a commercial airliner in terms of aircraft sold.

=== Mercure 200 project ===
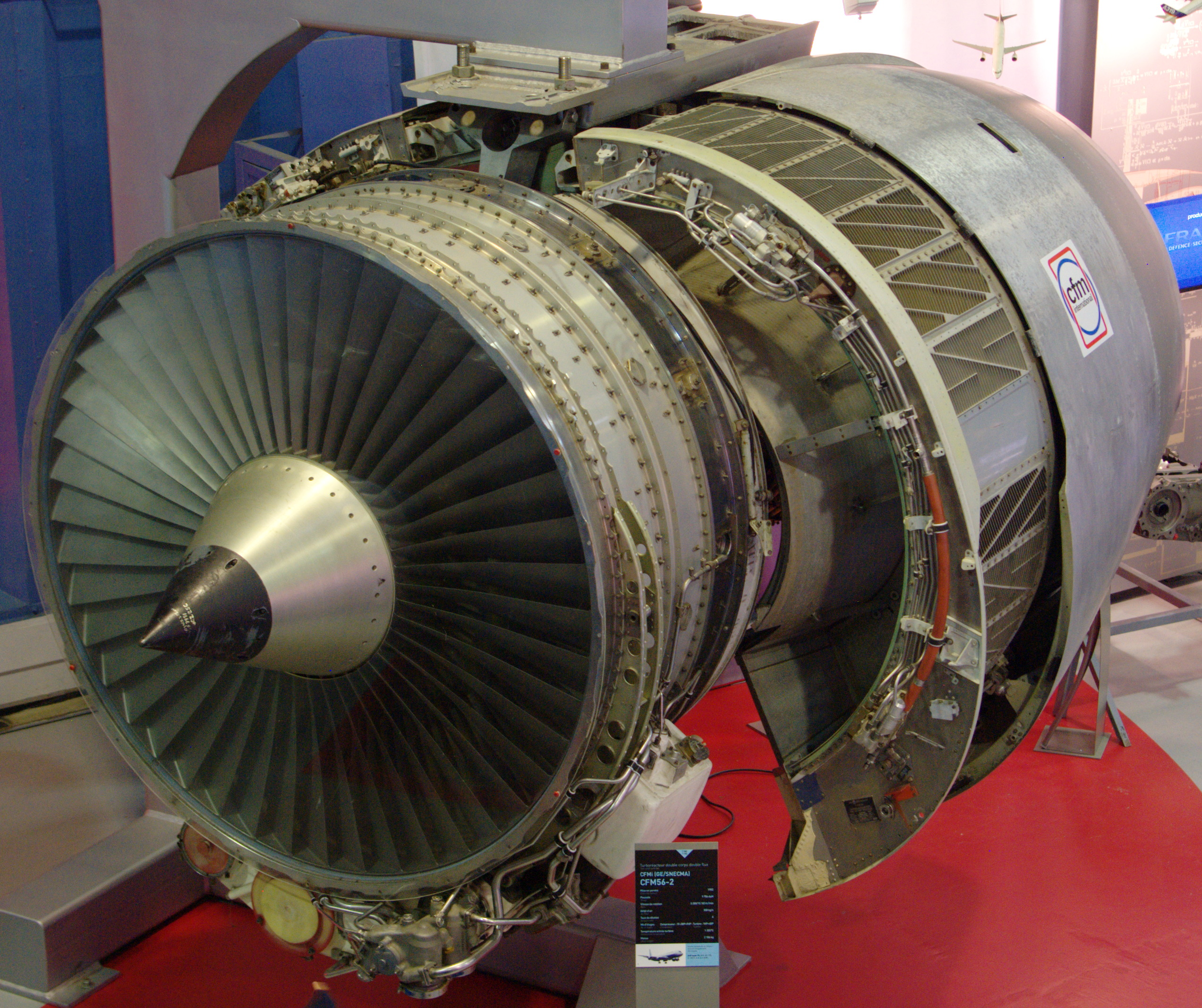
The CFM56 proposed for the Mercure 200-1/2.

After the commercial failure of the Mercure 100, Marcel Dassault requested a new version, the Mercure 200C, in cooperation with Air France, to carry 140 passengers across 2,200 km (1,200 nmi; 1,400 mi). Several major carriers in the United States showed some interest. At the beginning of 1973, an agreement was formed with the French government to finance this programme as a 200-million French Francs loan, refundable on sales after the 201st aircraft. However Air France sought a JT8D-117 powered airliner, quieter but larger, requiring an additional 80-million French Francs loan. The French government decided Dassault had to support half of the Mercure 200C development costs, which was impossible after the Mercure 100 failure. The project was then canceled.

To answer an official request, Dassault proposed a variant with the new 22,000–25,000 lbf (98–111 kN) CFM International CFM56 and a supercritical wing. In 1975, contacts were made with Douglas Aircraft Company and Lockheed Corporation to build and sell it in the US, and with SNIAS to build it in France. However, Marcel Dassault was concerned that the CFM56 was not yet ordered. The Mercure 200-1 would be lengthened by 6 m (20 ft) to accommodate 160 passengers in two classes to 184, while the 200-2 would keep the Mercure 100 fuselage length with the new wing to seat 124 in two classes to 150.

The 35 m (115 ft) wide wing of the 200 version would have an area of 135 m^{2} (1,450 sq ft), for a 39.6–35.7 t (87,000–79,000 lb) empty weight and a 66–76 t (146,000–168,000 lb) MTOW. Meanwhile, Douglas introduced a competing, stretched DC-9. Dassault then initiated contacts with General Dynamics, a Mirage F1 competitor with the F-16 Fighting Falcon, with no outcome. In 1981, Marcel Dassault tried to license the program in the US, unsuccessfully.

== Design ==
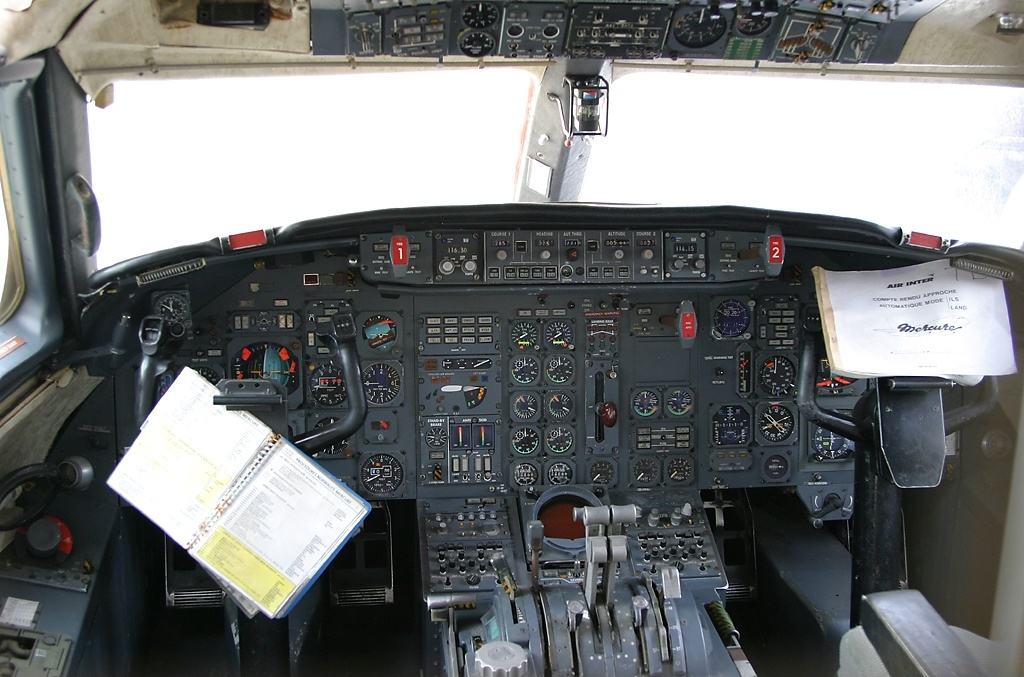
View of the Mercure's flight deck.

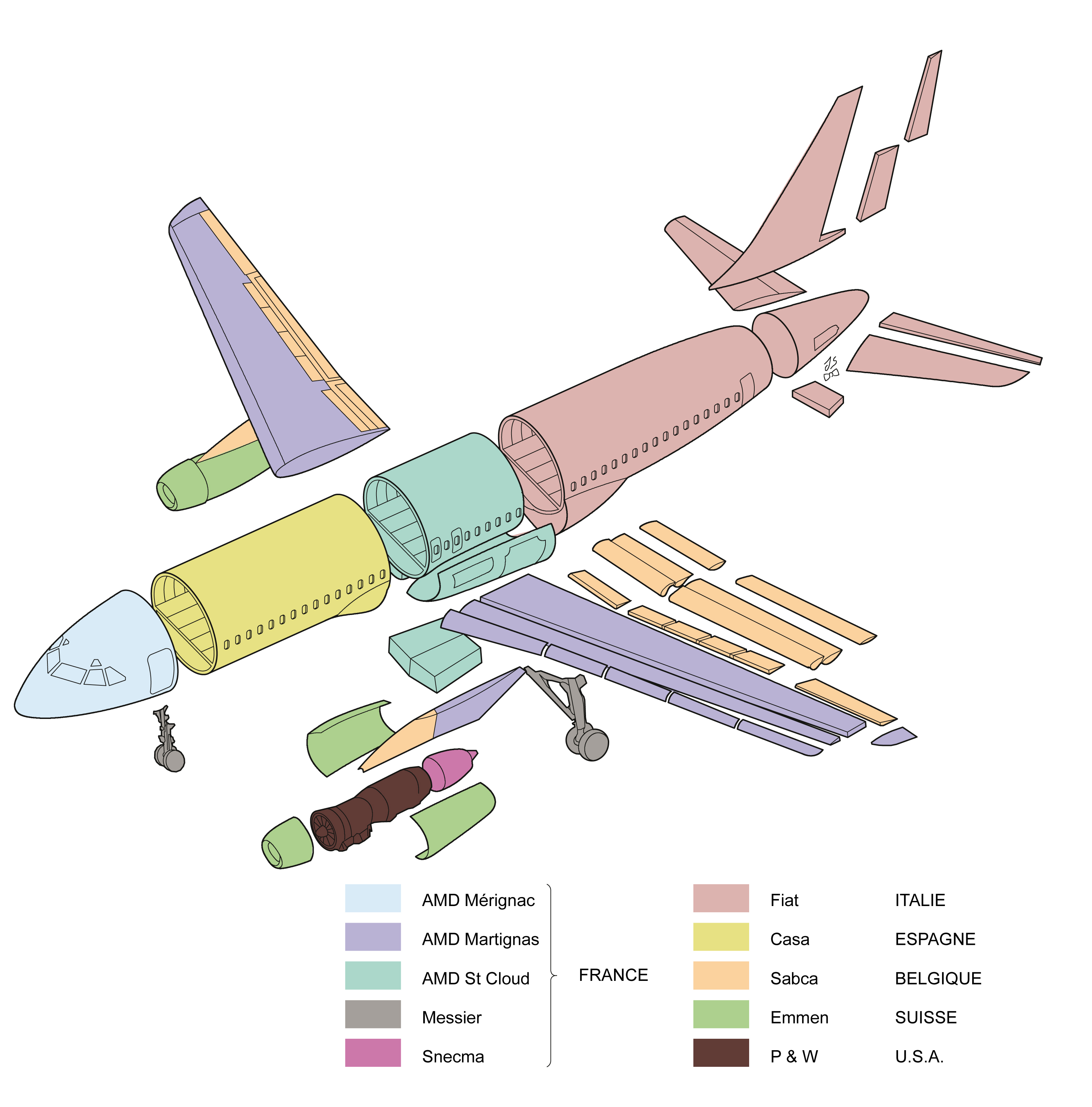
Diagram of partners involved at the beginning in the project, for the first prototype. During production, Fiat reduced its involvement.

The Dassault Mercure was a jet-powered narrow-body jet airliner, optimised for short-haul routes. It intentionally exchanged fuel for passenger capacity in order to carry a greater passenger load. As such, the Mercure had up to 17 per cent more seats than the competing Boeing 737 while having a shorter range. It was designed to be outfitted with a two-crew flight deck, although operator Air Inter had its aircraft flown by three-man crews. According to Flight International, the basic model of the Mercure featured a degree of built-in stretch potential. Elements of the design were reportedly capable of supporting the envisioned expanded model with little or no change, including much of the wing, cabin, and the undercarriage. The landing gear was spaced to accommodate the fitting of longer legs to, in turn, enable larger engines and an elongated fuselage to be later adopted.

The wing of the Mercure was largely conventional. It was relatively thick, possessing a section of 12.5 per cent thickness at the wing root, slimming to 8.5 per cent thickness at the tip of the wing. Aspects of the Mercure's wing, such as the general layout and individual wing sections, were optimised using a combination of wind tunnel tests and computer-generated simulations by Dassault's design team. The wing had a good lift/drag ratio and a high block efficiency. The flaps formed a continuous spanwise unit when deployed in the take-off position, requiring neither low-speed ailerons nor cut-outs to accommodate jet exhaust, due to the engines being fixed low down upon deep pylons.

Production Mercures were powered by a pair of Pratt & Whitney JT8D-15 turbofan engines, capable of generating a maximum of 15,500 lb (69 kN) thrust. These were mounted on underwing pylons, which were designed with anti-vibration mountings. The engines themselves featured joint Snecma/Dassault-developed thrust reverser and noise suppression systems. Significant attention had been paid to reducing engine noise, this issue having been one of the final topics of research during the Mercure's development. According to Flight International, there was a perception that the Federal Aviation Administration of the United States, a major potential market for the Mercure, may enact regulations that would necessitate the implementation of a noise-attenuation retrofit programme, and thus Dassault needed to be prepared to address this foreseen scenario.

Dassault emphasised the commercial value of the Mercure, highlighting its low operating costs across short sectors, which principally resulted from its refined aerodynamic features and low structural weight. The design also benefitted from an advanced fail-safe structure, the majority of which was milled using Dassault's traditional military manufacturing practices. The Mercure featured in-house-developed triplicated, fail-safe hydraulic flight control system and the flight controls lacked any manual reversion. Air conditioning also featured independent duplicated systems with a cross-feed tapped from the engines compressors along with, unusually, the auxiliary power unit for use during takeoffs and on the ground, as well as in the instance of a double-engine failure scenario. The electrics were composed of a pair of independent 120/128 volt three-phase 400 Hz AC systems fed via engine-driven alternators, while a third AC system was driven by the APU. There are also three independent 28 volt DC sources.

== Operational history ==
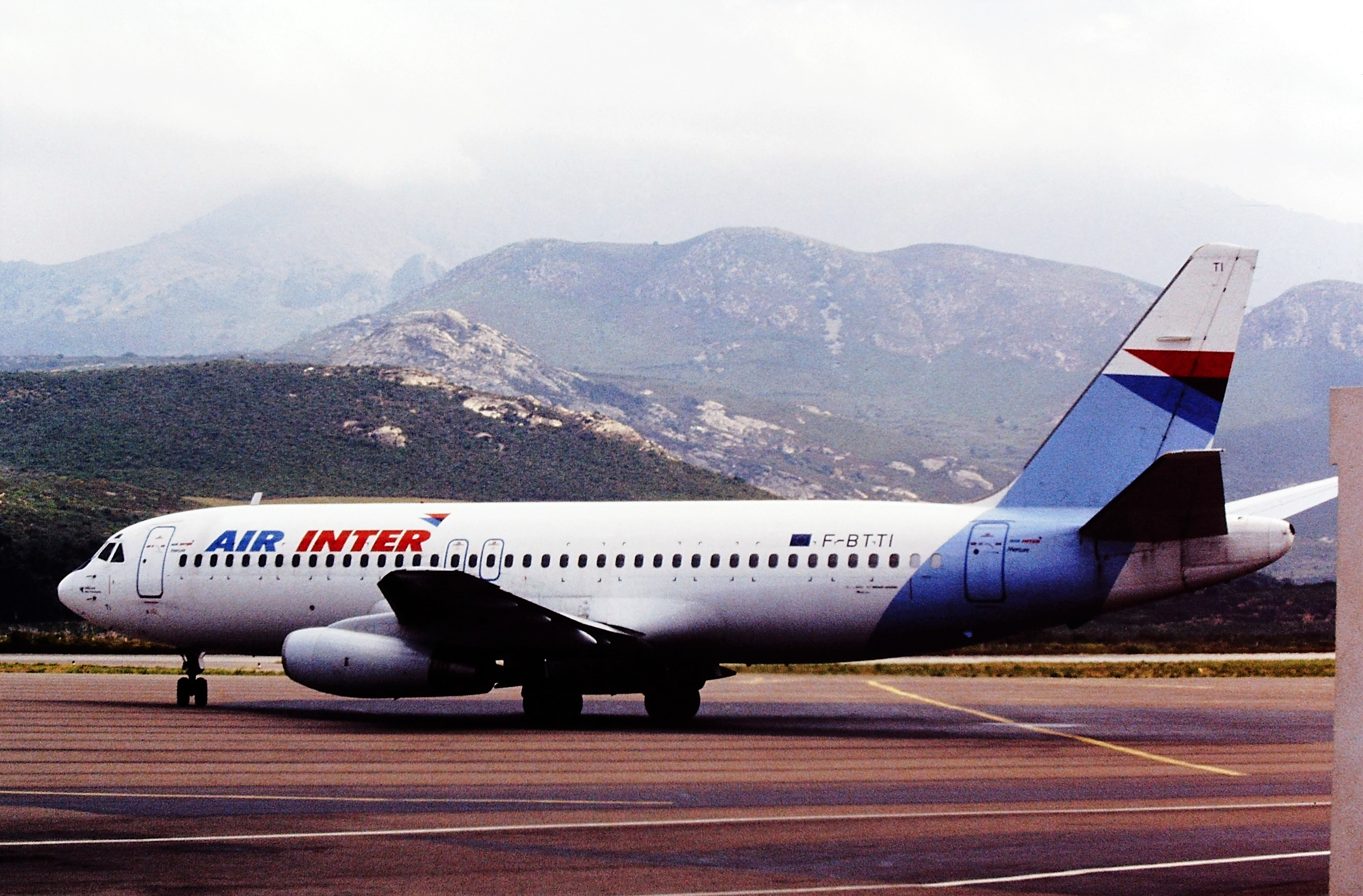
A Mercure operated by Air Inter.

Intending for the Mercure to be mass-produced in substantial numbers (According to Flight International, the 300th aircraft was projected to be delivered by the end of 1979), Dassault established a total of four plants especially for the Mercure program: Martignas (close to Bordeaux), Poitiers, Seclin (close to Lille) and Istres. Additional manufacturing work was distributed across locations throughout Europe, the production programme being a collaborative effort between Dassault, Fiat Aviazione of Italy, SABCA (Société Anonyme Belge de Constructions Aéronautiques) of Belgium, Construcciones Aeronáuticas SA (CASA) of Spain and the Swiss National Aircraft Factory at Emmen, all of which acted as risk-sharing partners in the venture.

On 30 January 1972, Air Inter placed an order for ten Mercures, which had to be delivered between 30 October 1973 and 13 December 1975. At this point, the break-even point was anticipated to be around 125–150 aircraft. However, due to the lack of other orders, the production line was shut down on 15 December 1975. Only a total of two prototypes and ten production aircraft were built. Air Inter eventually refurbished and bought one of the prototypes (number 02) to add it to its fleet.

On 29 April 1995, the last two Mercures in service flew their last commercial flights. Throughout their combined cumulative operational lifetimes, the Mercure accumulated a total of 360,000 flight hours, during which 44 million passengers were carried across 440,000 individual flights without any accidents occurring, and a 98% in-service reliability.

== Operators ==
France

- Air Inter

== Surviving aircraft ==
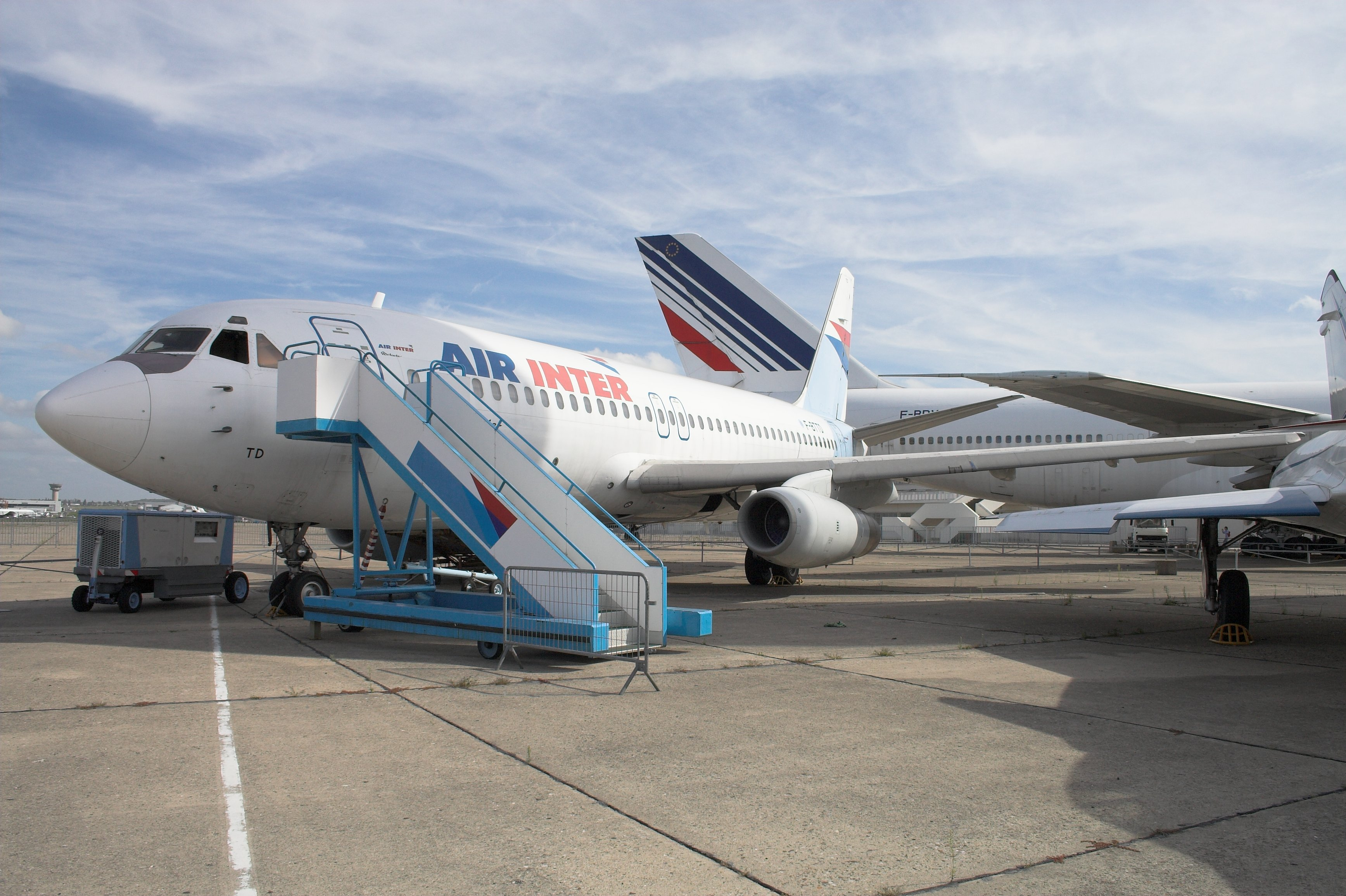
A Mercure display at the Musée de l’air et de l’espace at Paris–Le Bourget Airport.

- F-BTTB, c/n 2 is on display at the Technik Museum Speyer in Germany. The cabin of the aircraft, although closed to the public, can be seen through a grille. It is presented in the same condition as when it left service (on its last commercial flight), complete with French magazines on the passenger seats.
- F-BTTD, c/n 4 is on display at the Musée de l’air et de l’espace at Paris–Le Bourget Airport in France.
- F-BTTE, c/n 5 is preserved as a ground instructional airframe at Montpellier–Méditerranée Airport. for the Ecole Supérieure des Métiers de l'Aéronautique
- F-BTTF, c/n 6 is stored at Bordeaux–Mérignac Airport in France.
- F-BTTH, c/n 8 is preserved at Marseille Provence Airport.
- F-BTTI, c/n 9 is preserved as an instructional airframe at Bordeaux–Mérignac Airport in France.
- F-BTTJ, c/n 10 was preserved at the Musée Delta in Athis-Mons, near Paris-Orly Airport. It was cut up during 2018, with the forward fuselage now at Piet Smedts (PSAero) in Baarlo, the Netherlands, and a major portion of the upper fuselage in use as part of the scenery at a paintball center near Uden, the Netherlands.

== Specifications ==
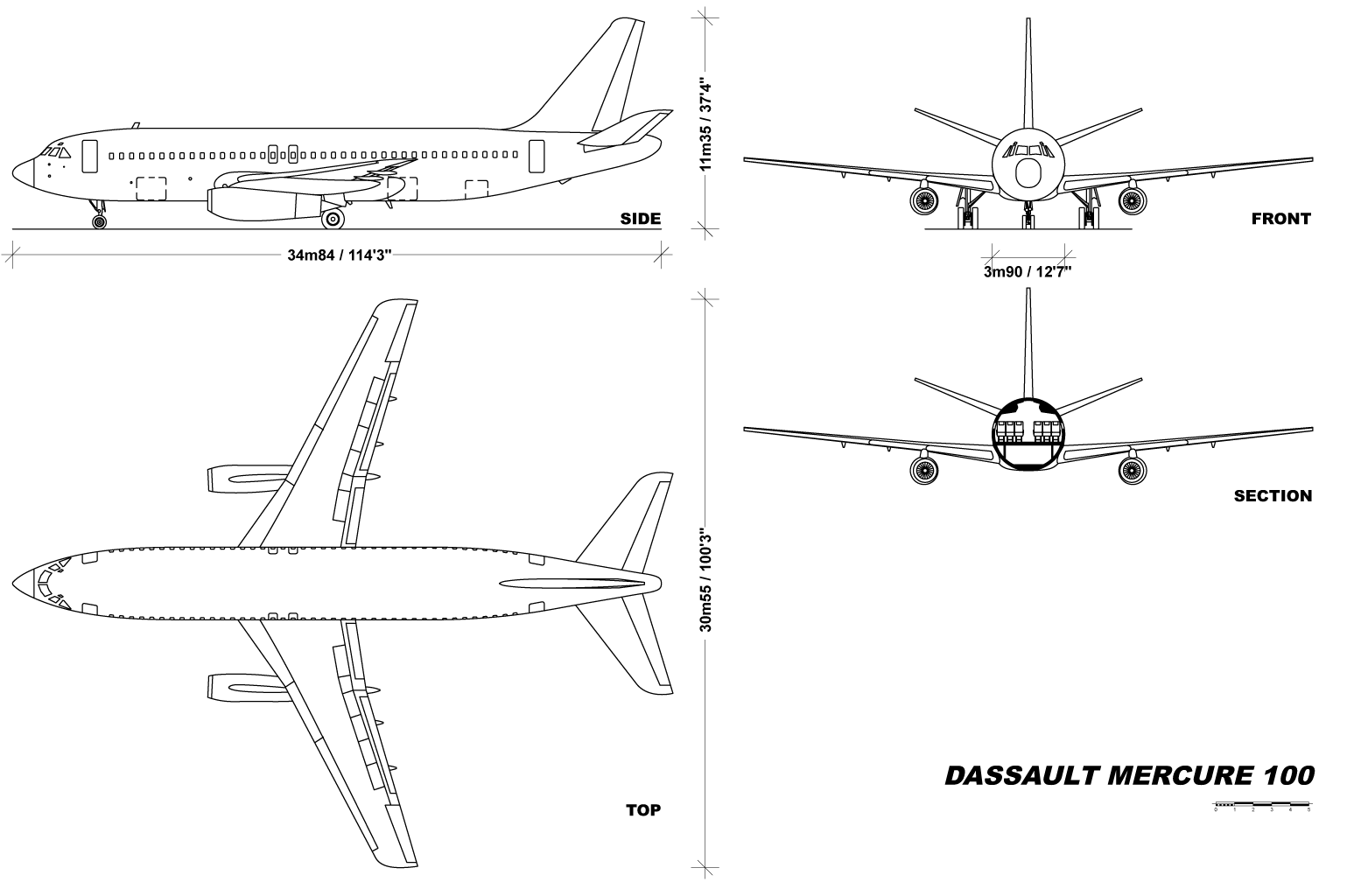
Three-view diagram of the Mercure.

Data from Jane's all the world's aircraft, 1975–76, Dassault Mercure

General characteristics

- Crew: 3 flight crew
- Capacity: 162 all-economy
- Length: 34.84 m (114 ft 4 in)
- Wingspan: 30.55 m (100 ft 3 in)
- Height: 11.36 m (37 ft 3 in)
- Wing area: 116 m^{2} (1,250 sq ft)
- Aspect ratio: 8
- Airfoil: Dassault sections
- Empty weight: 31,800 kg (70,107 lb)
- Max takeoff weight: 56,500 kg (124,561 lb)
- Fuel capacity: 18,400 L (4,900 US gal; 4,000 imp gal)
- Powerplant: 2 × Pratt & Whitney JT8D-15 low bypass turbofan engines, 69 kN (15,500 lbf) thrust each

Performance

- Maximum speed: 704 km/h (437 mph, 380 kn) EAS up to 6,100 m (20,000 ft)
- Maximum speed: Mach 0.85 (1041 km/h) 6,100 m (20,000 ft)
- Cruise speed: 926 km/h (575 mph, 500 kn) at 6,100 m (20,000 ft)
- Range: 2,084 km (1,295 mi, 1,125 nmi) with 4,100 kg (9,000 lb) fuel reserves
- Service ceiling: 12,000 m (39,000 ft)
- Rate of climb: 17 m/s (3,300 ft/min) at sea level, at 45,000 kg (100,000 lb)
- Fuel consumption: 2.96–5.03 kg/km (10.5–17.8 lb/mi) (2,440 kg / 825 km to 4,700kg / 935km)
- Takeoff roll: 2,100 m (6,900 ft)
- Landing roll: 1,755 m (5,670 ft)

== See also ==
Aircraft of comparable role, configuration, and era

- BAC One-Eleven
- Boeing 737-200
- McDonnell Douglas DC-9
- Airbus A320 family

== Sources ==
- Uijthoven, Réne L. (January–February 2005). "An 'Airbus" Before its Time?: Dassault's Mercure Airliner". Air Enthusiast. No. 115. pp. 70–73. ISSN 0143-5450.
