= Noirétable =

- Commune
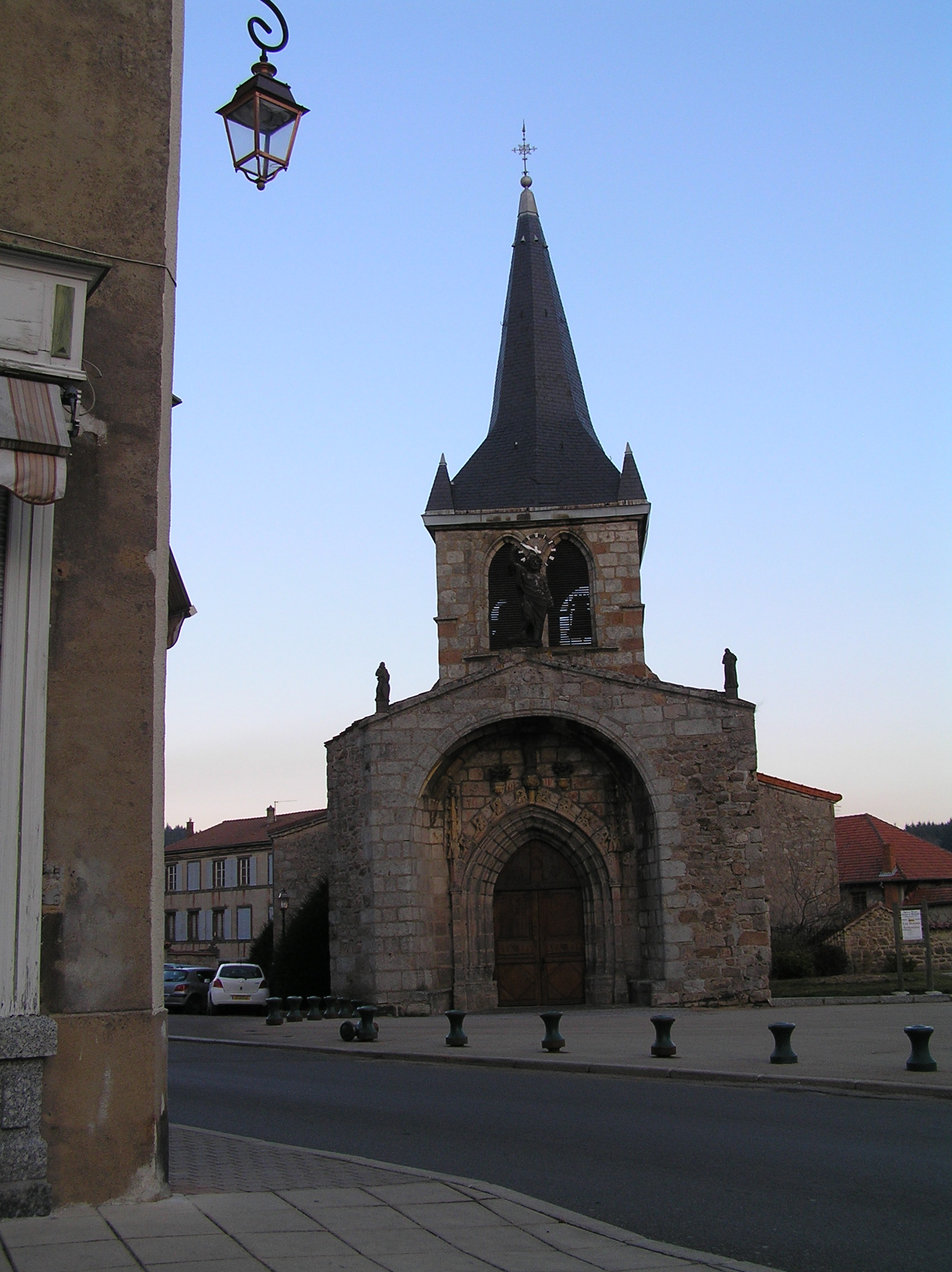

- Coat of arms
- Location of Noirétable
- Location within France Location within Auvergne-Rhône-Alpes
- Coordinates: 45°49′05″N 3°45′56″E
- Country: France
- Region: Auvergne-Rhône-Alpes
- Department: Loire
- Arrondissement: Montbrison
- Canton: Boën-sur-Lignon
- Intercommunality: CA Loire Forez

Government
  - Mayor (2021–2026): Julien Degout
- Area^{1}: 40.34 km^{2} (15.58 sq mi)
- Elevation: 727 m (2,385 ft)
- Highest elevation: 1,351 m (4,432 ft)
- Lowest elevation: 656 m (2,152 ft)
- Population (2023): 1,585
  - Density: 39.29/km^{2} (101.8/sq mi)
- Time zone: UTC+01:00 (CET)
  - Summer (DST): UTC+02:00 (CEST)
- INSEE/Postal code: 42159 /42440
- ^{1} French Land Register data, which excludes lakes, ponds, glaciers > 1 km^{2} (0.386 sq mi or 247 acres) and river estuaries.

Noirétable (French pronunciation: [nwaʁetabl]; Occitan: Neitrable) is a commune in the Loire department in central France.

== Population ==
Historical population
Year	Pop.	±% p.a.
1968	1,850	—
1975	1,873	+0.18%
1982	1,838	−0.27%
1990	1,719	−0.83%
1999	1,637	−0.54%
2007	1,704	+0.50%
2012	1,658	−0.55%
2017	1,588	−0.86%
2023	1,585	−0.03%
Source: INSEE

== See also ==
- Communes of the Loire department
