= List of accidents and incidents involving the Vickers Viscount =

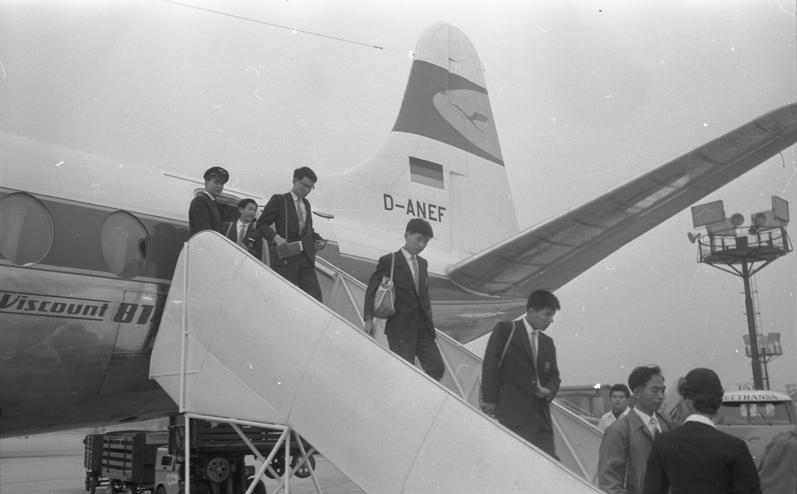
This aircraft, D-ANEF, later crashed while landing on 28 January 1972

As World War II came to a close the British government realised that it was going to have to drastically change its air manufacturing industry to avoid becoming dependent on American aircraft companies. To address this issue the Brabazon Committee was formed in 1943 to investigate the future needs of the British Empire's civilian airliner market.

As a direct result of the specifications spelled out by the Brabazon Committee the Vickers Viscount was created: this was a medium-range turboprop airliner first flown in 1948 by Vickers-Armstrongs, making it the first such aircraft to enter service in the world. It would go on to be one of the most successful of the first-generation postwar transports, with 445 being built.

Of that relatively large number of 445 aircraft there have been over 150 accidents and incidents, including 144 hull losses. An accident or incident can involve anything from slight damage to total write-off and crash with all people on board killed.

The first incident was on 27 August 1952 when G-AHRF, operated by the UK Ministry of Supply crashed at the Khartoum International Airport. Eventually, with many newer aircraft designs available, the Viscount was phased out of operations by industrial nations but one remains airworthy (as of April 2010) in the developing world, and another remains flyable in the United States.

In April 2003, 9Q-CGL of Trans Intair was damaged on landing at a gravel strip in the Congo. The pilots attempted to take off with damaged engines but as the aircraft was gaining altitude a second engine failed and the aircraft crashed into some trees becoming a total write-off.

== 1950s ==
- On 27 August 1952, G-AHRF, operated by the Ministry of Supply was damaged beyond economic repair at Khartoum International Airport when the starboard undercarriage collapsed on landing.
- On 31 October 1954, VH-TVA of Trans Australia Airlines was written off at Mangalore Airport, Victoria when it crashed shortly after take-off when simulating an engine failure on take-off, killing three of the eight crew.
- On 20 January 1956, G-AMOM of British European Airways crashed on take-off from Blackbushe Airport when the training pilot mishandled the controls for the starboard engines when simulating an engine failure on take-off.
- On 20 February 1956, N7404 (c/n 90) of Capital Airlines was damaged beyond economic repair at Chicago Midway International Airport when it landed short of the runway due to a malfunction of the propeller control switches. Despite this, the aircraft was remanufactured as c/n 301 and entered service with Trans-Canada Air Lines in May 1957.
- On 9 July 1956, CF-TGR (c/n 55), of Trans-Canada Airlines lost a propeller in flight on a flight from Chicago to Toronto and Montreal. The propeller entered the passenger cabin, killing a passenger. The aircraft made a successful emergency landing at Windsor, Ontario.
- On 1 October 1956, SU-AIC of Misrair was written off at Almaza Airport, Cairo, during an air raid by Royal Air Force Canberras of 12(B) Squadron as part of Operation Musketeer.
- On 12 December 1956, F-BGNK of Air France crashed at Dannemois, Île de France while on a training flight, killing all five crew on board.

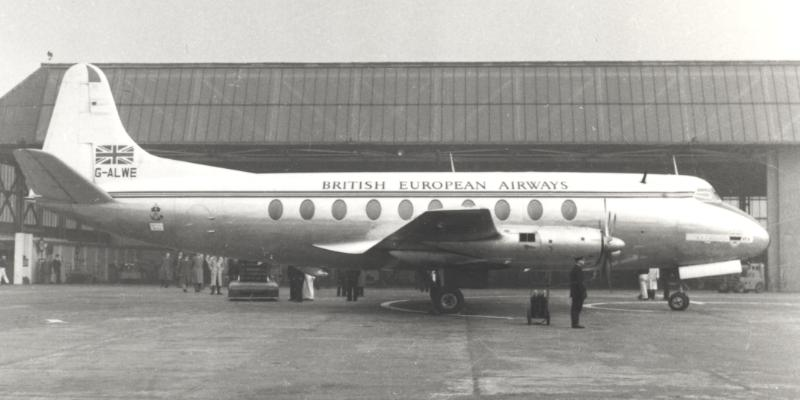
G-ALWE at Ringway in 1953

- On 14 March 1957, G-ALWE of British European Airways crashed at Wythenshawe, Greater Manchester on approach to Ringway Airport, Manchester when a bolt holding a part of the flap mechanism on the starboard wing failed. All 20 people on board were killed, as were two more on the ground.
- On 20 October 1957, G-AOYF, being operated by Vickers was damaged beyond economic repair at Johannesburg International Airport when the starboard undercarriage collapsed following a heavy landing.
- On 23 October 1957, G-AOJA of British European Airways was damaged beyond economic repair when it crashed on approach to Nutts Corner Airport, Belfast, killing all seven on board.

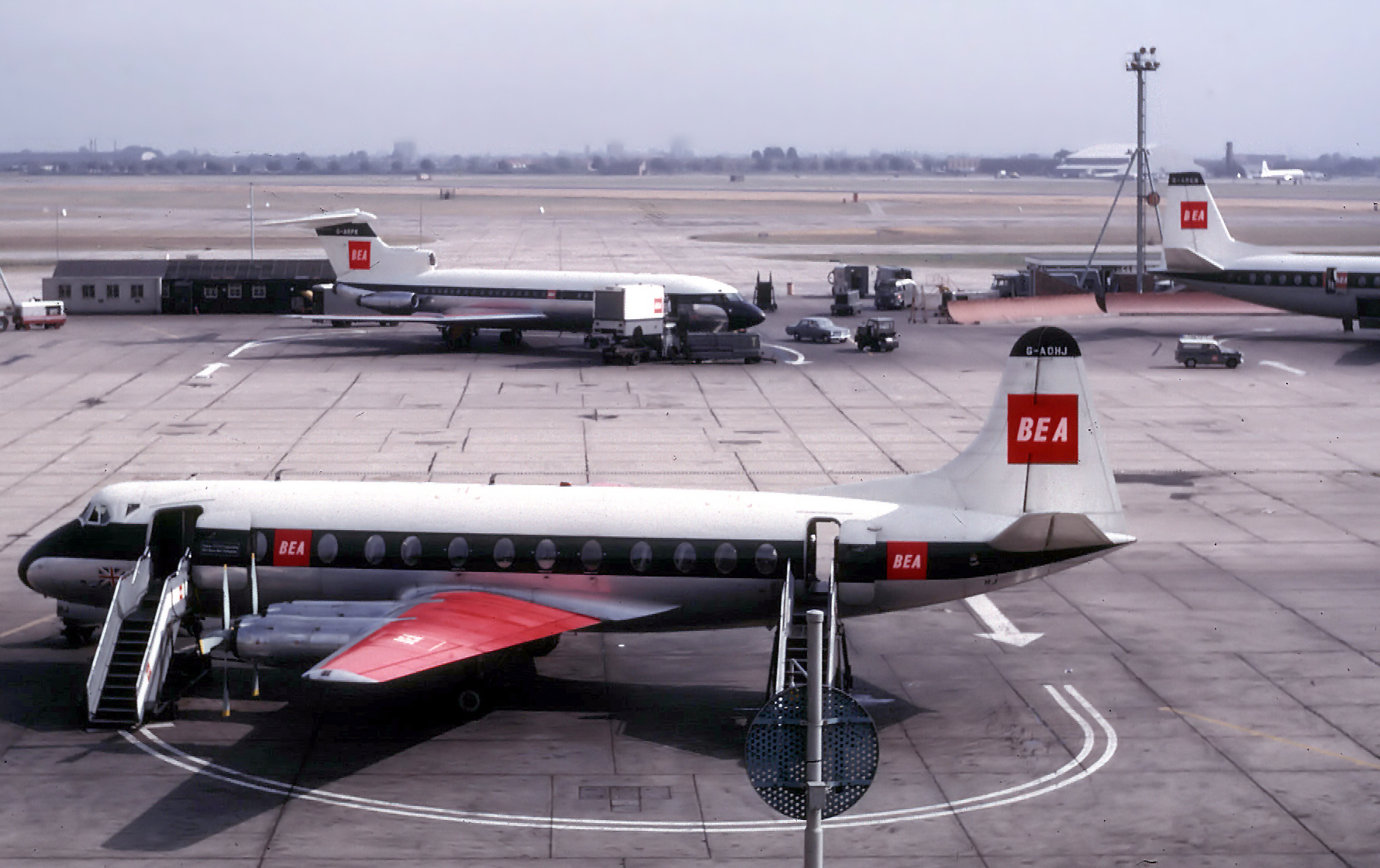
G-AOHJ of BEA, sister aircraft to G-AOHP

- On 17 November 1957, G-AOHP of British European Airways crashed at Ballerup after the failure of three engines on approach to Copenhagen Airport. The cause was a malfunction of the anti-icing system on the aircraft.
- On 6 April 1958, N7437, operating Capital Airlines Flight 67, stalled and crashed on approach to Tri-City Airport, Michigan. All 47 on board were killed. The cause was attributed to ice accretion on the horizontal stabiliser.
- On 9 April 1958, a Viscount of Cubana de Aviación was hijacked en route from José Martí International Airport, Havana to Santa Clara Airport. The aircraft landed at Mérida-Rejón Airport, Mexico where the hijack ended.
- On 28 April 1958, G-AORC of British European Airways crashed at Craigie, Ayrshire on approach to Prestwick Airport when the pilot misread the altimeter by 10,000 feet.
- On 20 May 1958, N7410 of Capital Airlines was involved in a mid-air collision with a Lockheed T-33 of the Air National Guard. All eleven on board were killed when it crashed at Brunswick, Maryland, as was one of the two crew members of the T-33.
- On 9 August 1958, VP-YNE of Central African Airways crashed 9 kilometres (5.6 mi) south east of Benina International Airport, Libya, killing 36 of the 54 people on board.
- On 22 October 1958, G-ANHC, operating British European Airways Flight 142 was involved in a mid-air collision with a North American F-86E Sabre of the Italian Air Force. The F-86E pilot ejected but all 31 on board the Viscount were killed when it crashed at Nettuno.
- On 1 November 1958, CU-T603 of Cubana de Aviación crashed into Nipe Bay on a flight from Miami International Airport to Varadero Airport. Seventeen of the 20 people on board were killed. The aircraft had been hijacked and the crash was due to fuel exhaustion.
- On 10 November 1958, CF-TGL of Trans-Canada Air Lines was destroyed by fire after it was struck by Lockheed L-749 Super Constellation N6503C of Seaboard & Western Airlines which had crashed on take-off from Idlewild Airport, New York.
- On 12 November 1958, ZK-BRD of National Airways Corporation, New Zealand, belly landed by mistake when touching down at Whenuapai Airport. The pilot was flying in the righthand seat and inadvertently pulled the undercarriage lever instead of the flaps lever upon touchdown. Moderate damage was done to the airframe, but it was repaired and put back into service.
- On 2 December 1958, G-ANRR of Hunting-Clan Air Transport crashed at Frimley, Surrey after losing its starboard wing in flight, killing all six crew on board.
- On an unknown date in 1958, VX217 of the Royal Air Force was damaged beyond economic repair by fire at RAF Seighford, Staffordshire.
- On 17 February 1959, TC-SEV of Turk Hava Yollari crashed at Jordan's Wood, Newdigate, Surrey, 5.2 kilometres (3.2 mi) west of London Gatwick Airport. Fourteen of the 24 people on board were killed. Turkish Prime Minister Adnan Menderes was among the survivors.
- On 5 March 1959, YS-09C of TACA International Airlines crashed shortly after take-off from Managua Airport when both port engines failed. Fifteen of the 19 people on board were killed.
- On 25 April 1959, a Viscount of Cubana de Aviación was hijacked on a flight from Varadero to Havana. The aircraft was landed at Key West International Airport, Florida.
- On 12 May 1959, N7463 operating Capital Airlines Flight 75 broke up in mid-air after encountering thunderstorms. The aircraft crashed at Chase, Maryland killing all 31 people on board.
- On 18 May 1959, AP-AJC of Pakistan International Airlines was damaged beyond economic repair on landing at Islamabad International Airport.
- On 14 August 1959, AP-AJE of Pakistan International Airlines crashed at Karachi International Airport while attempting an overshoot with two engines inoperative on a training flight. Two of the three people on board were killed.
- On 2 October 1959, a Viscount of Cubana de Aviación was hijacked on a flight from Havana to Antonio Maceo Airport, Santiago. The aircraft landed at Miami International Airport.
- On 3 October 1959, CF-TGY of Trans-Canada Air Lines was written off when it landed short of the runway at Toronto-Malton Airport.
- On 21 December 1959, I-LIZT of Alitalia crashed short of the runway at Ciampino Airport, Rome on a training flight exercise in landing with two engines inoperative. Both people on board were killed.
- On 22 December 1959, a VASP Vickers Viscount 827 registration PP-SRG while on approach to land at Rio de Janeiro-Galeão was involved in a mid-air collision with the Brazilian Air Force Fokker S-11 (T-21) registration FAB0742 in the vicinity of Manguinhos Airport. All 32 people on board the Viscount were killed, as were a further ten on the ground. The T-21 pilot parachuted to safety. This accident eventually led to the closure of Manguinhos Airport.

== 1960s ==
- On 5 January 1960, G-AMNY of British European Airways was damaged beyond economic repair at Luqa Airport when it departed the runway after landing following a loss of hydraulic pressure. Unable to brake or steer, the aircraft struck the limestone tower, trapping the pilot. There were no fatalities, but the fuselage was substantially damaged. The cause was a malfunctioning check valve in the hydraulic system.
- On 7 January 1960, G-AOHU of British European Airways was damaged beyond economic repair when the nose wheel collapsed on landing at Heathrow Airport. A fire then developed and burnt out the fuselage. There were no casualties among the 59 people on board.
- On 18 January 1960, N7462, operating Capital Airlines Flight 20 crashed at Holdcroft, Virginia after losing power from at first two, then all four engines. All 50 people on board were killed.
- On 12 April 1960, all three crew and a passenger of a Viscount of Cubana de Aviación claimed political asylum after the aircraft landed at Miami International Airport.
- On 17 July 1960, the captain of a Viscount of Cubana de Aviación hijacked the aircraft on a flight from José Martí International Airport, Havana to Miami International Airport. The aircraft landed at Palisadoes Airport, Kingston, Jamaica where the captain claimed political asylum.
- On 26 September 1960, Austrian Airlines Flight 901 crashed 11 kilometres (6.8 mi) short of the runway at Sheremetyevo International Airport, Moscow. Thirty-one of the 37 people on board were killed.
- On 29 September 1960, SU-AKW of United Arab Airlines broke up in mid-air and crashed 27.5 kilometres (17.1 mi) north of Elba. All 23 people on board were killed.
- On 12 June 1961, G-APKJ of All Nippon Airways was damaged beyond economic repair when the starboard undercarriage collapsed following a heavy landing at Osaka Itami Airport.
- On 30 October 1961, G-AODH of British United Airways was damaged beyond economic repair while attempting to land at Frankfurt Airport in poor visibility.
- On 15 November 1961, N6592C of Northeast Airlines was written off when it collided with Douglas DC-6 N8228H of National Airlines after landing at Logan International Airport. The DC-6 had started to take off without receiving clearance.
- On 15 November 1961, VT-DIH of Indian Airlines was damaged beyond economic repair when the copilot retracted the undercarriage during landing at Ratmalana Airport, Colombo.
- On 30 November 1961, Ansett-ANA Flight 325 crashed into Botany Bay shortly after takeoff from Kingsford-Smith Airport, Sydney. The starboard wing failed in a thunderstorm. All 15 people on board were killed.
- On 16 March 1962, SU-AID of United Arab Airlines was damaged beyond economic repair when it crash-landed 3 miles (4.8 km) short of Wadi Halfa Airport due to fuel exhaustion.
- On 8 July 1962, N243V of Continental Airlines was damaged beyond economic repair when the propellers struck the runway shortly after take-off from Lubbock International Airport. A wheels-up landing was made in a wheat field.
- On 10 October 1962, CF-THA of Trans-Canada Air Lines was involved in a ground collision with CF-101 Voodoo 17452 of the Royal Canadian Air Force at RCAF Station Bagotville. The Voodoo had been given clearance to take off before the Viscount had cleared the runway. It collided with the tail of the Viscount, killing a flight attendant and a passenger. The crew of the Voodoo ejected as the aircraft was set on fire by the collision. The Viscount was substantially damaged, but it was repaired and returned to service.
- On 19 November 1962, JA8202 of All Nippon Airways crashed at Nagoya while on a training flight, killing all four people on board.
- On 23 November 1962, N7430 operating United Air Lines Flight 297 was struck by a flock of whistling swans, one of which caused the structural failure of the port tailplane. The aircraft crashed at Ellicott City, Maryland killing all 17 on board.
- On 19 December 1962, SP-LVB of LOT Polskie Linie Lotnicze stalled on approach to Okęcie International Airport, Warsaw. All 33 people on board were killed.
- On 29 January 1963, N242V of Continental Air Lines crashed at Kansas City Downtown Municipal Airport when pitch control was lost due to ice accretion on the horizontal stabilizer. All eight people on board were killed.
- On 1 February 1963, OD-ADE operating Middle East Airlines Flight 265 was in a mid-air collision with C-47 CBK28 of the Turkish Air Force. Both aircraft crashed in Ankara, killing all 14 on board the Viscount, all three on board the C-47 and a further 87 people on the ground.
- On 17 February 1963, Vickers 807 Viscount, ZK-BWO, "City of Dunedin" of the National Airways Corporation overran the southern end of the runway at Wellington New Zealand, sliding down onto Moa Point Road. Minor damage sustained.
- On 14 April 1963, TF-ISU of Icelandair Flugfélag Islands crashed on approach to Oslo-Fornebu Airport. All 12 people on board were killed. Propeller malfunctioning or ice on the tail fins was a likely cause.
- On 12 August 1963, Air Inter Flight 2611, registered as F-BGNV, was damaged beyond economic repair when it crashed on approach to Lyon-Bron Airport in a storm. Fifteen of the 16 people on board were killed. One person on the ground was also killed.
- On 11 September 1963, VT-DIO of Indian Airlines crashed 51 kilometres (32 mi) south of Agra, killing all 18 people on board.
- On 23 February 1964, SU-AKX of United Arab Airlines was damaged beyond economic repair in a heavy landing at Beirut International Airport.
- On 28 March 1964, I-LAKE of Alitalia Flight 045 crashed into Monte Somma, killing all 45 people on board.
- On 21 April 1964, OD-ACX of Middle East Airlines was damaged beyond economic repair at El Arish.
- On 13 June 1964, CF-THT of Air Canada was damaged beyond economical repair when it crash-landed at Toronto International Airport after the failure of two engines on approach.
- On 9 July 1964, N7405 operating as United Airlines Flight 823 crashed at Parrottsville, Tennessee following an inflight fire. All 39 people on board were killed.
- On 4 September 1964, VASP Flight 141, PP-SRR, crashed into Pico da Caledônia, Nova Friburgo, Brazil. The aircraft was 35 kilometres (22 mi) off course at the time. All 39 people on board were killed.
- On 15 February 1965, EP-AHC of Iranian Airlines was damaged beyond economic repair when the port undercarriage collapsed as a result of a heavy landing at Isfahan International Airport.
- On 3 March 1965, PP-SRQ of VASP was damaged beyond economic repair at Rio de Janeiro–Galeão International Airport when the aircraft departed the runway during a simulated engine failure on take-off.
- On 19 March 1965, YI-ACU of Iraqi Airways was damaged beyond economic repair at Cairo International Airport when it ran into a number of lamp standards after a hydraulic system failure.

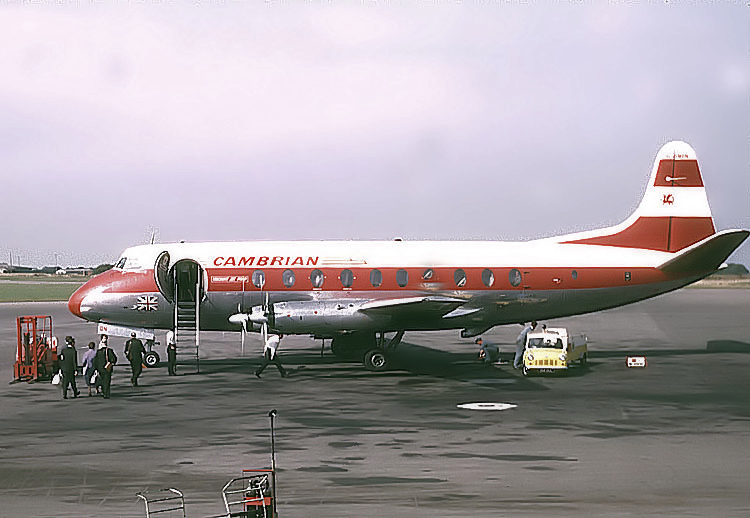
A Viscount of Cambrian Airways

- On 20 July 1965, G-AMOL of Cambrian Airways crashed on approach to Speke Airport, killing both crew and two people in the factory.
- On 20 August 1965, SP-LVA of LOT Polskie Linie Lotnicze crashed at Jeuk after entering a thundercell. All four people on board were killed.
- On 22 September 1966, Ansett-ANA Flight 149 crashed near Winton, Queensland after a mid-air fire caused the structural failure of the port wing. All 24 people on board were killed.
- On 31 October 1966, PP-SRM of VASP was damaged beyond economic repair when it overran the runway at Rio de Janeiro Santos Dumont Airport.
- On 19 January 1967, N7431 of United Air Lines was damaged beyond economic repair when it collided with a snow tractor on the runway at Norfolk International Airport.
- On 13 March 1967, ZS-CVA operating as South African Airways Flight 406 crashed into the sea off East London killing all 25 people on board.
- On 3 May 1967, G-AVJZ of Channel Airways was written off at Southend Airport, Essex when a propeller was feathered on take-off. Two people on the ground were killed.
- On 22 June 1967, EI-AOF of Aer Lingus stalled and crashed at Ashbourne, County Meath killing all three people on board.
- On 30 June 1967, VR-AAV of Aden Airways was damaged beyond economic repair at Aden International Airport when a bomb on board exploded. The aircraft was in quarantine at the time after an engine change.

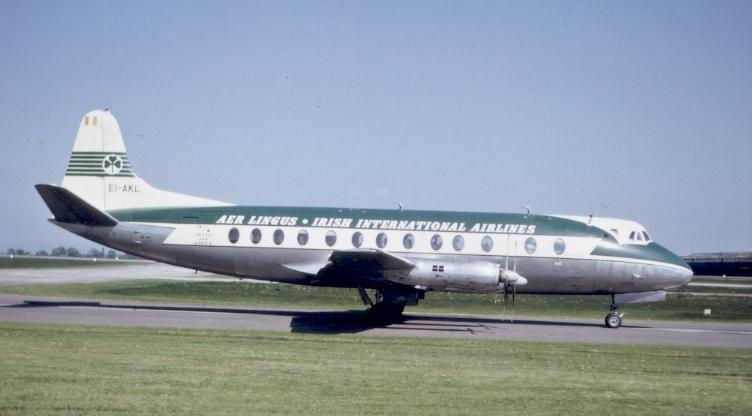
A Viscount of Aer Lingus

- On 21 September 1967, EI-AKK of Aer Lingus was damaged beyond economic repair when it made a wheels-up landing at Bristol Lulsgate Airport.
- On 28 November 1967, N7465 of United Air Lines was damaged beyond economic repair at Raleigh-Durham International Airport when the nose wheel collapsed on landing.
- On 8 December 1967, FAB2100 of Força Aérea Brasiliera was written off at Rio de Janeiro Santos Dumont Airport when the undercarriage malfunctioned.
- On 11 December 1967, N7429 of United Air Lines was damaged beyond economic repair when it overran the runway at Akron-Canton Airport.
- On 24 March 1968, EI-AOM, operating Aer Lingus Flight 712 broke up in mid-air and crashed into the Irish Sea, killing all 61 on board. Speculation that the aircraft had been shot down by the Royal Air Force was finally ruled out in 2002, with a structural failure of the port tailplane identified as a likely cause.
- On 4 May 1968, G-APPU of Channel Airways overran the runway on landing in a rainstorm at Southend Airport having landed at too high a speed and aquaplaned. The aircraft was written off.

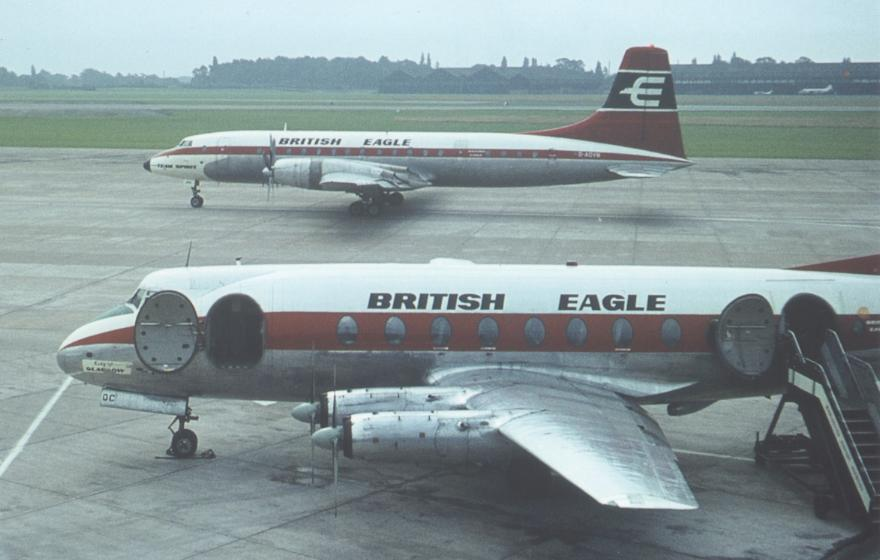
A Viscount of British Eagle

- On 9 August 1968, British Eagle Flight 802 crashed on Bundesautobahn 9 near Langenbruck (Reichertshofen) killing all 48 people on board. The cause of the accident was a loss of electrical power in flight, leading to instruments giving incorrect readings and loss of control.
- On 11 September 1968, a Viscount of Air Canada was reported to have been hijacked by a Cuban passenger.
- On 15 September 1968, PP-SRE of VASP crashed at São Paulo while on a crew training flight. Both of the two crew were killed besides one person on the ground.
- On 28 December 1968, OD-ACT of Middle East Airlines was destroyed in a raid by Israeli Commandos at Beirut International Airport.
- On 31 December 1968, MacRobertson Miller Airlines Flight 1750 broke up in mid-air and crashed 48 kilometres (30 mi) south of Port Hedland, Western Australia. All 26 people on board were killed.
- On 2 February 1969, TC-SET of Turk Hava Yollari crashed on approach to Esenboğa International Airport, Ankara. There were no casualties.
- On 20 February 1969, G-AODG of British Midland Airways was damaged beyond economic repair when it landed short of the runway at East Midlands Airport. There were no casualties.
- On 20 March 1969, G-AVJA of British Midland Airways crashed on take-off at Ringway Airport, Manchester. Three of the four people on board were killed.
- On 7 April 1969, CF-THK of Air Canada was damaged beyond economic repair by a fire which occurred on take-off from Sept-Îles Airport. The aircraft landed back at Sept-Îles but one passenger was killed in the fire.
- On 27 June 1969, N7410 of Aloha Airlines was damaged beyond repair when it collided on the ground with Douglas DC-9-31 N906H of Hawaiian Airlines at Honolulu International Airport.
- On 16 September 1969, a Viscount of Turk Hava Yollari was hijacked and landed in Sofia.
- On 26 October 1969, 4X-AVC of Arkia crashed at Lod International Airport on a night training flight. There were no casualties.
- On 22 December 1969, LX-LGC of Luxair was damaged beyond economic repair when it ran off the runway at Luxembourg – Findel Airport and the nose wheel collapsed.

== 1970s ==
- On 19 January 1970, G-AMOA of Cambrian Airways was damaged beyond economic repair in a heavy landing at Lulsgate Airport, Bristol.
- On 22 January 1970, G-AWXI of British Midland Airways was damaged beyond economic repair at Heathrow Airport, London when an engine caught fire on take-off. A successful emergency landing was made at Heathrow.
- On 1 March 1970, CF-THY of Air Canada collided in mid-air with Ercoupe 415 CF-SHN on approach to Vancouver International Airport. The Ercoupe pilot was killed.
- On 6 May 1970, 6O-AAJ of Somali Airlines caught fire on approach to Mogadishu International Airport. The nosewheel collapsed in a heavy landing and the aircraft was burnt out. Five of the 30 people on board were killed.
- On 3 June 1970, HC-ART of SAETA overran the runway at Cuenca Airport and was damaged beyond economic repair.
- On 25 January 1971, YV-C-AMV of Línea Aeropostal Venezolana crashed into a mountain near Mérida. Thirteen of the 47 people on board were killed.
- On 8 August 1971, N7415 of Aloha Airlines was damaged beyond economic repair at Honolulu International Airport when a fire broke out upon landing.
- On 9 August 1971, VT-DIX of Indian Airlines was damaged beyond economic repair when it overran the runway at Jaipur Airport. The aircraft was landed with a tailwind on a wet runway.
- On 20 October 1971, a Viscount of SAETA was hijacked by six people. It landed at Cuenca Airport.
- On 1 November 1971, YV-C-AMZ of Línea Aeropostal Venezolana crashed shortly after take-off from La Chinita International Airport, Maracaibo. All four people on board were killed.
- On 10 November 1971, PK-MVS of Merpati Nusantara Airlines crashed into the sea 75 miles (121 km) off Sumatra killing all 69 people on board.
- On 28 December 1971, F-BOEA of Air Inter was damaged beyond economic repair at Clermont-Ferrand Aulnat Airport when it departed the runway on a training flight during a simulated failure of #4 engine.
- On 21 January 1972, HK-1347 of Líneas Aéreas La Urraca crashed at Funza after an explosion on board. All 20 people on board were killed.

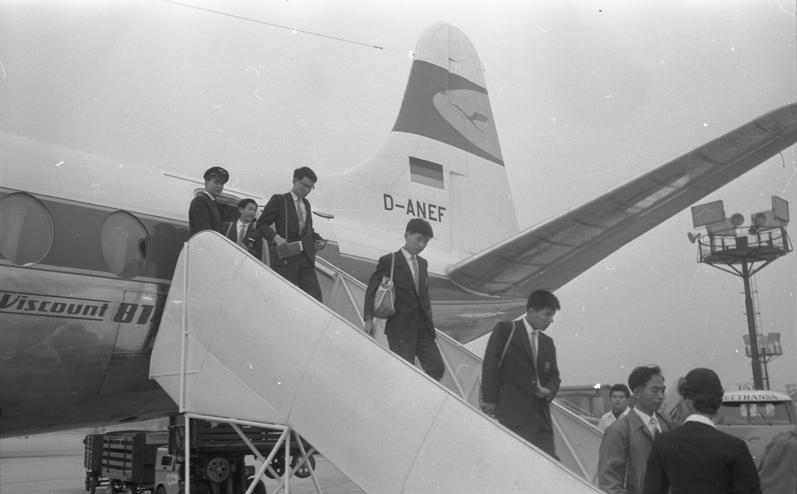
D-ANEF at Köln-Bonn in 1960

- On 28 January 1972, D-ANEF of Airwork Services was damaged beyond repair when the undercarriage collapsed after a heavy landing at Bournemouth International Airport.
- On 5 April 1972, a Viscount of Merpati Nusantara Airlines was the subject of an attempted hijacking. The hijacker was killed.
- On 24 August 1972, XY-ADF of Union of Burma Airways was damaged beyond economic repair at Sittwe Airport when it departed the runway on landing and the undercarriage collapsed.
- On 27 October 1972, F-BMCH of Air Inter crashed into the Pic du Picon, 4 kilometres (2.5 mi) west of Noirétable, Loire. Sixty of the 68 people on board were killed.
- On 19 January 1973, G-AOHI of British European Airways crashed into Ben More while on a test flight. All four people on board were killed.
- On 17 April 1973, YI-ACL of Iraqi Airways was damaged beyond economic repair when it made a wheels-up landing at Mosul International Airport after suffering fuel exhaustion.
- On 15 May 1973, PP-SRD of VASP was damaged beyond economic repair when it departed the runway on landing at Salvador Airport and the undercarriage collapsed.
- On 7 June 1973, HK-1061 of Aerolíneas TAO was damaged beyond economic repair in an accident on landing at El Dorado Airport, Bogotá.
- On 21 January 1974, a Viscount of Aeropesca Colombia was hijacked and diverted to Cali.
- On 8 June 1974, HK-1058 of Aerolíneas TAO crashed at Monte San Isidoro after the structural failure of the port tailplane in flight. All 44 people on board were killed.
- On 14 August 1974, YV-C-AMX of Línea Aeropostal Venezolana flew into La Gloria, Isla Margarita killing all 49 people on board.
- On 7 October 1974, a Viscount of Far Eastern Air Transport was the subject of an attempted hijacking. The hijacker was overpowered and the aircraft landed at its intended destination of Taipei Songshan Airport.
- On 1 February 1975, PK-RVM of Mandala Airlines was damaged beyond economic repair when it overran the runway at Taipei Songshan Airport.
- In March 1975, XW-TDN of Royal Air Lao crashed at Phnom Penh International Airport. The pilot was not qualified to fly the aircraft. All four people on board were killed. Accident aircraft also reported as XW-TFK with a date of 15 March.
- On 11 May 1975, CX-AQO of PLUNA was damaged beyond economic repair when it departed the runway at Jorge Newbery Airport, Buenos Aires.
- On 31 July 1975, B-2029 of Far Eastern Air Transport crashed at Taipei Songshan Airport, killing 27 of the 75 people on board.
- On 7 January 1976, PK-RVK of Mandala Airlines was damaged beyond repair when it overran the runway at Sam Ratulangi International Airport, Manado.
- On 15 August 1976, HC-ARS operating SAETA Flight 232 crashed into the Chimborazo volcano, killing all 59 people on board. The wreckage was not discovered until 17 October 2002.
- On 15 January 1977, Linjeflyg Flight 618 operated by SE-FOZ crashed at Kälvesta on approach to Bromma Airport, Stockholm due to ice accretion on the tailplane leading to a loss of control. All 22 people on board were killed.
- On 4 September 1977, HC-IBL of SAN Ecuador crashed into a mountain in the Cajas Mountains killing all 33 people on board.
- On 14 December 1977, HK-1267 of TAC Colombia was damaged beyond repair at Palo Negro International Airport, Bucaramanga.
- On 29 December 1977, HC-BEM of SAN Ecuador crashed into a hill near Cuenca. All 24 people on board were killed.
- On 10 June 1978, 9G-ACL of West African Air Cargo was damaged beyond economic repair when the undercarriage collapsed on landing at Spriggs Payne Airport, Monrovia.
- On 3 September 1978, VP-WAS operating Air Rhodesia Flight 825 was shot down by a SAM-7 missile killing 28 of the 56 people on board. A further ten people were killed by ZIPRA guerillas. The incident site was in the Whamira Hills.
- On 12 February 1979, VP-YND, operating Air Rhodesia Flight 827 was shot down by a SAM-7 missile and crashed in the Vuti African Purchase Area near Kariba killing all 59 people on board. ZIPRA guerillas were responsible for the shoot-down.
- On 23 April 1979, HC-AVP of SAETA crashed in the Pastaza Province on a flight between Mariscal Sucre International Airport and Cuenca Airport, killing all 57 people on board. The wreckage was discovered in 1984. The aircraft was 25 nautical miles (46 km) off track.

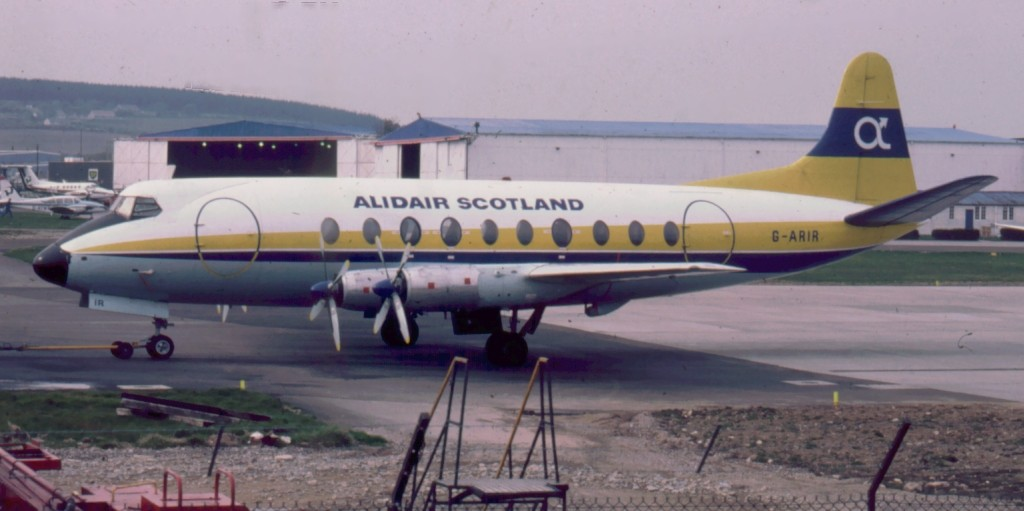
A Viscount in Alidair livery

- On 25 October 1979, G-BFYZ of Alidair was damaged beyond economic repair when the aircraft departed the runway at Kirkwall Airport after #4 propeller struck the runway. The nosewheel collapsed when the aircraft reached an intersecting runway.

== 1980s ==
- On 14 July 1980, HC-BHB of Aerolíneas Cóndor was damaged beyond economic repair in a landing accident at Loja Airport.
- On 17 July 1980, G-ARBY of Alidair crashed at Ottery St Mary when all four engines failed due to fuel exhaustion. All 62 people on board survived.
- On 26 August 1980, PK-IVS of Bouraq Indonesia Airlines suffered an in-flight failure of the starboard elevator and crashed 26 kilometres (16 mi) north east of Jakarta killing all 37 people on board.
- On 28 August 1980, VT-DJC of Huns Air was damaged beyond economic repair when the nosewheel collapsed after the aircraft bounced three times on landing at Vijayawada Airport.
- On 1 May 1981, PK-RVN of Mandala Airlines was damaged beyond economic repair when it departed the runway on landing at Semarang Achmad Yani Airport, causing the starboard and nose gear to collapse.
- On 18 August 1981, N7407 of Airgo Air Freight was damaged beyond repair at an airport in Florida during Hurricane Dennis.
- On 26 August 1981, HK-1320 of Aeropesca Colombia operating Flight 221 flew into Mount Santa Elena killing all 50 people on board.
- On 26 March 1982, HK-2382 of Aeropesca Colombia flew into a mountain near Queate while on a flight from La Vanguardia Airport to El Dorado International Airport, killing all 21 people on board.
- On 8 October 1982, HC-ATV of SAN Ecuador was damaged beyond economic repair at Mariscal Lamar Airport, Cuenca.
- In July 1984, Z-YNI of Air Zimbabwe was damaged beyond economic repair in an accident on the ground at Harare International Airport. It was withdrawn from use as a result and passed to the airports fire department for use as a training aid.
- On 28 August 1984, 9Q-CPD of Zaire Aero Service crashed after take-off from N'djili Airport.
- On 13 January 1985, PK-RVT of Mandala Airlines was damaged beyond economic repair in a landing accident at Adisucipto International Airport, Yogyakarta.
- On 19 October 1985, N923RC of Ray Charles Enterprises was damaged beyond economic repair when it departed the runway on landing at Bloomington Airport.
- On 11 January 1988, G-APIM of British Air Ferries was damaged beyond economic repair when it was in a ground collision with Short 330 G-BHWT at Southend Airport. G-APIM was subsequently repaired and donated to Brooklands Museum for preservation.
- On 18 June 1988, PK-MVG of Merpati Nusantara Airlines was damaged beyond economic repair when it suffered a hydraulic system failure and departed the runway at Polonia International Airport, Medan.
- On 4 July 1988, PK-IVW of Bouraq Indonesia Airlines was damaged beyond economic repair when the starboard and nose gear collapsed during a tailwind landing at Sultan Aji Muhammad Sulaiman Airport.
- On 23 November 1988, G-BBVH of Gibraltar Airways was damaged beyond economic repair in a landing accident at Tangier-Boukhalef Airport.
- In 1988, 9Q-CTS of Filair was damaged beyond economic repair in a landing accident at Tshikapa Airport.

== 1990s ==
- On 31 March 1991, HK-1708 of Intercontinental de Aviación was damaged beyond economic repair while on a flight from El Dorado International Airport to Gustavo Rojas Pinilla International Airport. Both artificial horizons failed in turbulence at 16,000 feet (4,900 m). Control of the aircraft was regained at 4,000 feet (1,200 m) and a successful emergency landing was made at Olaya Herrera Airport, Medellín. The lower main spar was found to have cracked. The aircraft had previously suffered a gear collapse on 14 February 1988.
- On 24 July 1992, PK-RVU of Mandala Airlines, flew into Lalaboy Mountain, 15 kilometres (9.3 mi) west of Pattimura Airport at an altitude of 2,300 feet (700 m), killing all 70 people on board.
- On 27 July 1992, XA-SCM of Aero Eslava flew into Cerro Xocotlihuipa at an altitude of 10,130 feet (3,090 m), killing all four people on board. The aircraft had been authorised to descend to 12,000 feet (3,700 m).
- On 28 August 1992, PK-IVX of Bouraq Indonesia Airlines was damaged beyond economic repair when an engine fire on take-off forced the crew to abort the take-off at Syamsudin Noor Airport.
- On 25 February 1994, G-OHOT of British World Airlines crashed 7.5 kilometres (4.7 mi) south west of Uttoxeter after suffering multiple engine failures in icing conditions. One of the two crew was killed.
- On 26 September 1994, PK-IVU of Bouraq Indonesia Airlines was substantially damaged in a landing accident at Pontianak Airport. The aircraft was repaired and returned to service.
- On 24 March 1996, G-OPFE of British World Airways was damaged beyond economic repair when it made a wheels-up landing at Belfast International Airport.
- On 6 June 1997, 9Q-CWL of Bazair suffered an onboard fire and crashed at Irumu, killing all 23 people on board.

== 2000s ==
- On 24 July 2001, 3D-OHM of Transtel Togo was damaged beyond economic repair in a take-off accident at N'Djamena International Airport when the aircraft departed the runway, damaging the engines and propellers. Although written off by the insurers, the aircraft was repaired. Repairs were almost complete when a soldier accidentally discharged his firearm, puncturing a fuel tank.
- In April 2003, 9Q-CGL of Trans Intair was damaged on landing at a gravel strip in the Congo. A takeoff with only three engines operable was attempted but a second engine failed and the aircraft crashed into some trees. The aircraft was damaged beyond economic repair.
