= Flight 149 =

Flight 149 may refer to:

- Ansett-ANA Flight 149, crashed on 22 September 1966
- British Airways Flight 149, landed in occupied Kuwait on 2 August 1990
