= British Eagle International Airlines Flight 802 =

British Eagle International Airlines Flight 802 may refer to

- British Eagle Flight 802, crashed on 9 August 1968
- British Eagle International Airlines Flight 802/6, crashed on 29 February 1964
