= Flight 802 =

Flight 802 may refer to

- British Eagle Flight 802, crashed on 9 August 1968
- World Airways Flight 802, crashed on 8 September 1973
