= British European Airways Flight 142 =

1958 mid-air collision

Accident
- Date: 22 October 1958
- Summary: Mid-air collision
- Site: Nettuno, near Anzio, Italy; 41°27′54″N 12°37′55″E
- Total fatalities: 31
- Total survivors: 1

First aircraft
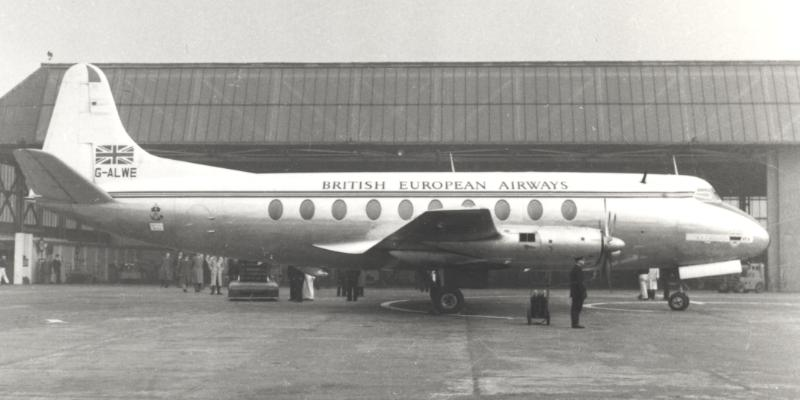
- A Vickers Viscount 701, similar to the accident aircraft. This aircraft would be involved in another accident
- Type: Vickers Viscount 701
- Operator: British European Airways
- Registration: G-ANHC
- Flight origin: London Heathrow Airport, England
- Destination: Naples Airport, Italy
- Passengers: 26
- Crew: 5
- Fatalities: 31
- Survivors: 0

Second aircraft
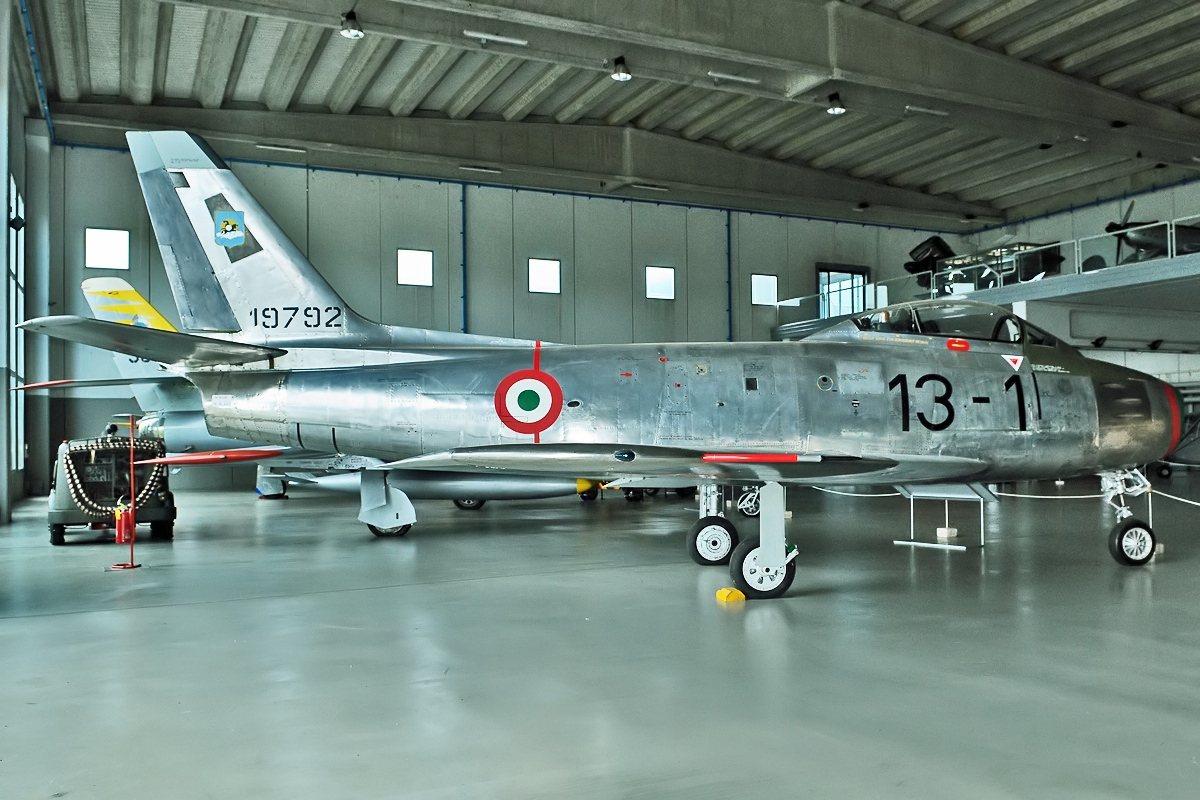
- A North American F-86E Sabre, similar to the accident aircraft
- Type: North American F-86E Sabre
- Operator: Italian Air Force
- Passengers: 0
- Crew: 1
- Injuries: 1
- Survivors: 1

British European Airways Flight 142 (callsign Bealine 142) was a scheduled service between London Heathrow Airport and Naples Airport. On 22 October 1958, it was flown by a Vickers Viscount 701, registered G-ANHC, and named "Sir Leopold McClintock". During the flight, the Viscount collided with an Italian Air Force North American F-86E Sabre over Anzio, Italy. All 31 occupants (26 passengers and 5 crew) of the Viscount died. Captain Giovanni Savorelli, the F-86 pilot, didn't use his ejector seat but instead parachuted down successfully and spent 6 months in hospital.

== Accident ==
Flight 142 was piloted by Captain Frank Foster and took off from Heathrow Airport on 22 October 1958 and was headed to Naples. At 12:55 local time the captain reported is position to the Rome Air traffic controller, being above Ostia at an altitude of 23,500 feet (7,500 m). However, as later discovered, the plane was off course, having actually entered a military zone without having had any authorization, which was a 200-hectare area used as a shooting range.

The flight was reported to continue towards the Ponza NDB at 11:57 local time. Meanwhile, at 10:45 local time, a formation of four F-86 Sabre's departed from Pratica di Mare Air Base for a tactical group training exercise on a route prohibited to all civil aircraft flights. The four F-86s were 5 miles east of Anzio to carry out a reverse attack maneuver consisting of an initial dive followed by a climb with a right turn and finally a violent dive with recovery of the plane in horizontal flight. During the dive that followed the climb of the fighter plane piloted by the formation leader, it collided with Flight 142. The wing of the Sabre struck the upper fuselage of the Viscount causing a violent explosive decompression which caused the passenger plane to crash into the military testing area, killing all 31 occupants.

A witness to the collision was a housewife from Nettuno who claimed to have seen the bodies of passengers falling from the plane. A male passenger was found alive by rescuers, but he died while being taken to hospital. Eight bodies were so heavily disfigured that they could not be recognized. On the plane there were secret Admiralty documents that were to be delivered to the island of Malta. The documents were recovered and sent back to England.

At the same time, after the collision, the military aircraft became uncontrollable due to the loss of a wing, forcing the pilot to eject, with the latter reaching the ground few meters from the wreckage. The pilot, who was seriously injured, was rescued by two farmers and taken to a hospital in Nettuno, where he remained under guard waiting to be able to testify about the incident.

== Investigation ==
Immediately after the accident, a nine-member commission was formed and chaired by an Italian Air squadron general. At the end of the investigation, the final report attributed the collision to a tragic fatality, since none of the crews could have noticed the potential collision, a fact attributable to the flight profile of the F86s and the military nature of the exercise that was taking place. It was also noted that the Viscount had strayed out of its airway and into a military-prohibited area. The management of British European Airways (BEA), supported by the local press, heavily contested this reconstruction of the facts.
