= HMAS Kimbla =

Royal Australian Navy ship

History

Australia
- Builder: Walkers
- Laid down: 4 November 1953
- Launched: 23 March 1956
- Commissioned: 26 March 1956
- Decommissioned: 15 February 1985
- Motto: "Seek The Depths"

General characteristics
- Displacement: 733 t (721 long tons)
- Length: 54.56 m (179 ft 0 in)
- Beam: 9.75 m (32 ft 0 in)
- Draught: 3.66 m (12 ft 0 in)
- Speed: 10 knots (19 km/h; 12 mph)
- Complement: 40

HMAS Kimbla was a boom defence vessel of the Royal Australian Navy from 1956 until 1985.

== History ==
HMAS Kimbla was built by Walkers of Maryborough, Queensland, being commissioned on 26 March 1956. It operated in Australian and New Guinea waters, laying and maintaining moorings. Built as a boom defence vessel, it was converted to an oceanographic research ship in 1959.

Kimbla participated in a number of salvage operations. In June 1960 it was involved in the recovery of a Trans Australia Airlines Flight 538 followed in November 1961 by Ansett-ANA Flight 325. In October 1962 it was involved in the recovery of a RAN Sea Venom aircraft off Jervis Bay and in 1978 of a General Dynamics F-111C off New Zealand.

On 31 August 1979, a crewman was washed overboard in heavy seas while the ship was leaving Port Phillip Bay. When it was decommissioned on 15 February 1985, Kimbla was the last RAN ship to use a reciprocating steam engine as a form of propulsion.
