= Ansett-ANA Flight 325 =

1961 aviation accident in New South Wales

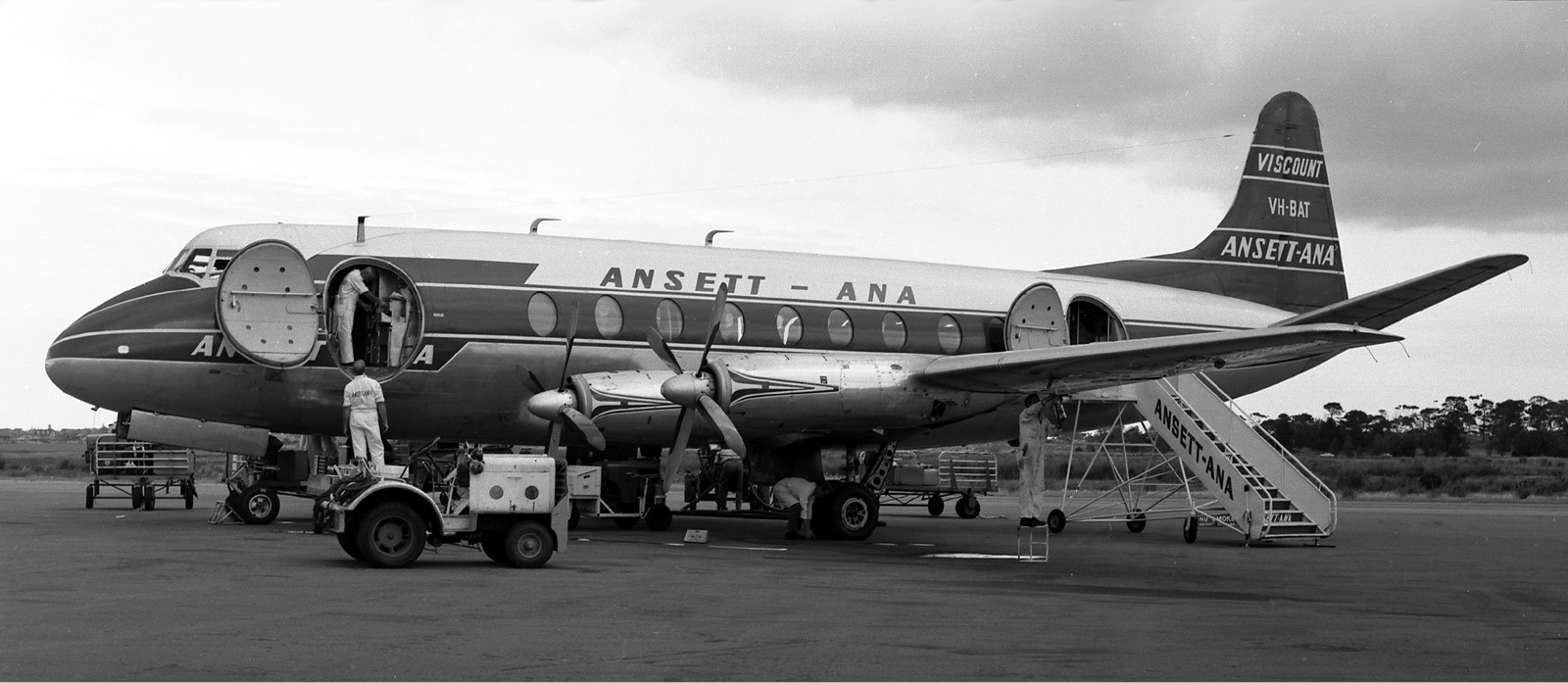
- Viscount 700 series similar to VH-TVC

Accident
- Date: 30 November 1961
- Summary: Structural failure of wing in thunderstorm
- Site: Botany Bay, Sydney, Australia; 33.9807°S 151.1998°E

Aircraft
- Aircraft type: Vickers Viscount 720
- Operator: Ansett-ANA
- Registration: VH-TVC
- Flight origin: Sydney, Australia
- Destination: Canberra, Australia
- Occupants: 15
- Passengers: 11
- Crew: 4
- Fatalities: 15
- Survivors: 0

On the evening of 30 November 1961, Ansett-ANA Flight 325, a service from Sydney to Canberra, Australia, operated by a Vickers Viscount 720, broke up in mid-air and crashed shortly after takeoff, when it encountered a severe thunderstorm. All 15 people on board were killed.

Radio contact was lost about nine minutes after takeoff, but no reports of a crash were initially received by the authorities. The next day, wreckage and a fuel slick were found on the surface of Botany Bay, Sydney. The aircraft had been drawn into a thunderstorm and subjected to extreme turbulence. It had broken up and crashed into Botany Bay less than 3 miles (4.8 km) from where it took off.

The loss of Flight 325 was the first fatal accident suffered by Ansett since commencement of operations in 1935.

== The flight ==
Record of talk in Sydney Airport control tower on the night of the accident.

Ansett-ANA Flight 325, a Vickers Viscount registered VH-TVC "John Oxley", took off from Sydney Airport on runway 07 at 7:17 pm local time for a scheduled 128 nmi (237 km) passenger flight to Canberra. The aircraft was being leased from Trans Australia Airlines in exchange for a Douglas DC-6B aircraft. On board were the pilot, Stan Lindsay; co-pilot, Ben Costello; two air hostesses, Aileen Keldie and Elizabeth Hardy; and eleven passengers.

Around the time of takeoff there was a severe thunderstorm with very heavy rain to the south of the airport and another to the north. Above Sydney airport there was cloud at about 800 feet (240 m) but no thunderstorm activity. Flight 325 was observed to enter cloud shortly after take off. Five other aircraft took off while this meteorological situation existed.

Flight 325 was directed to take off and continue heading east towards the Tasman Sea until reaching an altitude of 3,000 feet (910 m), turn around and fly west to a radio navigation aid 6 1/2 miles (10.5 km) west of the airport (Note: Padstow locator beacon.) and then turn south-west for Canberra. The crew were to ensure they passed over the airport no lower than 5,000 feet (1,520 m).

Five minutes after takeoff the crew advised they had reached 6,000 feet (1,830 m). About 3½ minutes later, Sydney air traffic control called Flight 325 with a routine request for information but received no reply. No further radio communication was received from Flight 325 so when it did not arrive at Canberra Airport authorities knew it had suffered an accident. An air search was planned to commence at dawn.

Approximately nine minutes after takeoff the outer section of the right wing (Note: The wing spar broke at station 323, slightly outboard of the No. 4 engine. The outer section of the right wing, including the wingtip and aileron, was torn away from the aircraft. All four engines were found with the main wreckage in Botany Bay.) had been torn away and the aircraft had crashed into Botany Bay. The rain, thunder and lightning associated with the thunderstorm over Botany Bay had been so intense that no-one saw the aircraft or observed anything crash into the water. Accident Investigator Frank Yeend wrote "The weather was so bad that this aircraft crashed in the middle of a major city without anybody having seen it or heard anything that would give cause to alarm."

== Search and recovery ==
External images
- HMAS Kimbla recovers wreckage from Botany Bay
- Navy clearance divers prepare to search for the right tailplane in waters to the north of Kurnell

When it became clear Flight 325 was not responding to radio calls and the aircraft could not be seen on the radar screen in the control tower the Alert Phase of search and rescue procedures was initiated. (Note: In 1961 the control tower at Sydney Airport was equipped with an early civil radar system. The operator worked in a darkened enclosure and watched a small screen to see the radar echoes from aircraft.) The Police, Royal Australian Air Force, Royal Australian Navy and Volunteer Coastal Patrol were notified. A message was broadcast on the radio frequency used by coastal shipping. The Department of Civil Aviation air-sea rescue launch based on Botany Bay made a circuit of the Bay's foreshores. When Flight 325 failed to arrive at its destination, search and rescue procedures were elevated to the Distress Phase. In the hours after loss of contact with Flight 325 no report was received of an aircraft accident so there was general foreboding that it had crashed into the Tasman Sea. At first light the next morning two Douglas DC-3 aircraft began searching the sea to the east of Sydney. A helicopter and several motor launches also began searching Botany Bay.

Soon after sunrise the crew of the helicopter reported an item floating on Botany Bay. The crew of the air-sea rescue launch investigated the sighting and retrieved a piece of damaged upholstery. Airline staff confirmed the upholstery was from a Vickers Viscount pilot's seat. Searchers on the beach in the north-east of Botany Bay, near Bunnerong Power Station, found some cabin furnishings and human remains. At the south of the Bay the outer section of the right wing, still showing registration VH-TVC, was found protruding above the surface of shallow water near Kurnell. (Note: The outer section of the right wing was located 1,500 feet (460 m) from the shore near Bonna Point; north of Balboa Street.)

Later in the day police and navy divers investigated a large fuel slick in the centre of Botany Bay and discovered the scattered wreckage of VH-TVC in 25 feet (7.6 m) of water, 1.6 miles (2.6 km) north of the outer section of the right wing. The aircraft had crashed 2.8 miles (4.5 km) south-east of Sydney airport. (Note: The main wreckage was located from Sydney airport on a bearing of 140° (magnetic.) This was 8,350 feet (2,550 m) north of, and 100 feet (30 m) east of, the outer section of the right wing. 33.9807°S 151.1998°E)

The Royal Australian Navy sent a team of clearance divers and HMAS Kimbla, a boom defence vessel, to Botany Bay and brought the main wreckage of VH-TVC to the surface. After a week Kimbla was replaced by HMAS Walrus, a smaller workboat from which the navy divers worked for many weeks, locating and recovering many smaller pieces of wreckage.

The right tailplane was missing from the main wreckage. Navy divers eventually found the missing parts of the tailplane close to where the outer section of the right wing was found, indicating the right tailplane was also torn from the aircraft prior to its impact with the water.

Numerous small items, including many from the number 4 engine nacelle, were found on Kurnell peninsula, south of the outer section of the right wing. The wreckage trail was aligned approximately north-south with the main wreckage at the north in Botany Bay; and the smaller, lighter items at the south on Kurnell peninsula.

The aircraft was not equipped with a flight data recorder or cockpit voice recorder so it was important that as much as possible of the wreckage should be recovered and examined. (Note: In November 1960, after Mr Justice Spicer's investigation of the fatal crash of Fokker Friendship Trans Australia Airlines Flight 538 he recommended flight data recorders should be installed in all turbine-powered airline aircraft registered in Australia. This recommendation was executed but the fleet of Viscount aircraft had not been equipped with recorders at the time of the loss of Flight 325.) The recovery effort continued for 3 months.

The top section of the rudder was not found during the recovery of the wreckage. Twelve years after the accident the missing section was found in shallow water in Botany Bay, near Kurnell Beach. (Note: The missing section of rudder was found by a Kurnell resident on 2 March 1974.)

== Investigation ==
External image
- Wreckage of VH-TVC laid out in a hangar.

As pieces of wreckage from VH-TVC were progressively recovered from Botany Bay they were laid out in a hangar at Sydney airport to allow investigators to search for the cause of the accident. The right tailplane and the outer section of the right wing had received almost no damage on impact with the water but the main wreckage in Botany Bay showed extensive disintegration, suggesting a very high speed of impact. (Note: All four engines were producing power at the time of the impact. The angles of the propeller blades led investigators to estimate that the aircraft struck the water at a speed between 300 and 400 knots (560 and 740 km/h). Post mortem examination of the bodies showed all occupants died instantly due to impact forces.) No evidence was found of any fault or mechanical failure that might have existed prior to the accident.

It soon became clear that the spar in the right wing had broken and the outer section of the wing had been torn away by the airstream. The lower boom (or lower flange) in the wing spar had failed in upward bending at station 323 due to extreme overload. (Note: Station 323 on the right wing is a little outboard of number 4 engine. All four engines were found with the main wreckage in Botany Bay. Some small items from the nacelle of number 4 engine detached at the same time as the outer section of the right wing and were found on Kurnell peninsula.) The wing had been overloaded while the aircraft was flying at very high speed, probably in excess of the maximum safe speed of 260 knots (480 km/h) indicated airspeed. As an immediate consequence of the aircraft's gyrations during failure of the right wing, the right tailplane had also been subjected to excessive forces and had separated from the fuselage.

Engineers assisting the accident investigation calculated that for the wing spar to fail in the way it did in VH-TVC would require the aircraft to be flying faster than its maximum speed of 260 knots (480 km/h) and, while being subjected to a severe recovery manoeuvre by the crew, to encounter a very strong gust, possibly as much as 100 feet per second (30 m/s). At the time of the accident investigation, gusts up to 72 ft/s (22 m/s) had been measured inside thunderstorms by suitably equipped research aircraft. Investigators were aware of the crash of Capital Airlines Flight 75, a Vickers Viscount that crashed in Maryland, USA in May 1959 after encountering extreme turbulence associated with thunderstorms.

All the wreckage lay in a trail aligned north-south. By making assumptions about the likely terminal velocities of key pieces of wreckage, accident investigators were able to determine the approximate location, height and speed of the aircraft at the time it broke up. They believed the outer section of the right wing was torn away when the aircraft was south of its intended flight path, heading in a northerly direction, and at a height between 3,500 and 5,500 feet (1,070 and 1,680 m). They believed this occurred at a time when the aircraft should have been at about 9,000 feet (2,740 m), heading west and passing over a radio navigation aid nine miles away. It was necessary for the investigation to find a rational explanation as to why the aircraft was so far from where it should have been.

Accident investigators studied a scientific report titled The Thunderstorm published in the USA in 1949. This report proposed that where two thunderstorms were separated, edge to edge, by less than 6 miles (9.7 km) there was a likelihood of severe turbulence in the clear air between the two. The accident investigators believed it was likely that Flight 325, while flying west between two mature thunderstorms, encountered strong turbulence that caused the crew to lose control and the aircraft to lose a significant amount of height and enter the thunderstorm to the south of the airport. While flying north, possibly in an attempt to escape the thunderstorm, the crew encountered continuing strong turbulence that caused control to be lost again. The aircraft accelerated to its maximum safe speed or faster and while the crew were struggling to regain control the aircraft was suddenly subjected to extreme turbulence that caused the right wing and the right tailplane to fail.

== Board of Accident Inquiry ==
A Board of Accident Inquiry was appointed in 1962 to investigate all aspects of the accident to Flight 325. chairman of the board was Justice Spicer of the Commonwealth Industrial Court. The Board first convened on 12 June 1962, sat for 24 days and closed on 27 July 1962.

Investigation of the accident concluded:

The cause of the accident was the failure in flight of the starboard outer wing in upward bending due to tensile overloading of the lower spar boom at station 323, probably induced by a combination of manoeuvre and gust loading when the speed of the aircraft was in excess of 260 knots. The circumstances and available evidence carry a strong implication that the in-flight structural failure was preceded by a loss of control with a consequential increase in speed to at least 260 knots. The most probable explanation for the loss of control is that the aircraft entered an area of unexpected turbulence of such severity as to deprive the pilots of full recovery. (Note: The Board of Inquiry heard evidence from two Ansett-ANA pilots who had experienced loss of control of a Viscount aircraft in severe turbulence. The two pilots were flying Viscount VH-BAT from Adelaide to Sydney on 3 January 1960 when they encountered severe turbulence at an altitude of about 18,000 feet in the vicinity of Mildura. The aircraft descended vertically until they were able to regain control at an altitude of about 9,000 feet.)

The Inquiry gave a strong impetus for greater co-operation between the meteorological service and air traffic control; and for airline aircraft in Australia to be equipped with weather radar to give pilots of these aircraft the ability to avoid hazardous weather. All Australian airliners were required to be equipped with weather radar by 1 June 1963.

== Aircraft ==
External images
- Photograph of VH-TVC
- Two photographs of VH-TVC in flight

The aircraft was Vickers Viscount 720, serial number 46. It was registered VH-TVC and first flew on 17 November 1954. It was delivered to Trans Australia Airlines on 8 December 1954 and named John Oxley in honour of an early Australian explorer and surveyor.

VH-TVC was leased to Ansett-ANA on 7 March 1960 and operated with the passenger cabin configured for 48 passengers. (Note: In February 1960 the Australian Government imposed a cross-charter arrangement as part of the Two Airlines Policy. Ansett-ANA was required to charter two of its Douglas DC-6B to TAA; and TAA was required to charter three of its Vickers Viscounts to Ansett-ANA. The intention was to equalise the passenger-carrying capacity of the two airlines, and make their aircraft fleets more uniform so that neither would have any significant commercial advantage over the other.)

The aircraft made 12,010 flights and flew for 16,946 hours.

== See also ==
- Ansett-ANA Flight 149 – Viscount accident in 1966
- MacRobertson Miller Airlines Flight 1750 – Viscount accident in 1968
- List of accidents and incidents involving the Vickers Viscount
- List of disasters in Australia by death toll
- List of accidents and incidents involving commercial aircraft
- List of accidents and incidents involving airliners by location
