= Alidair =

British airline

Alidair Ltd.
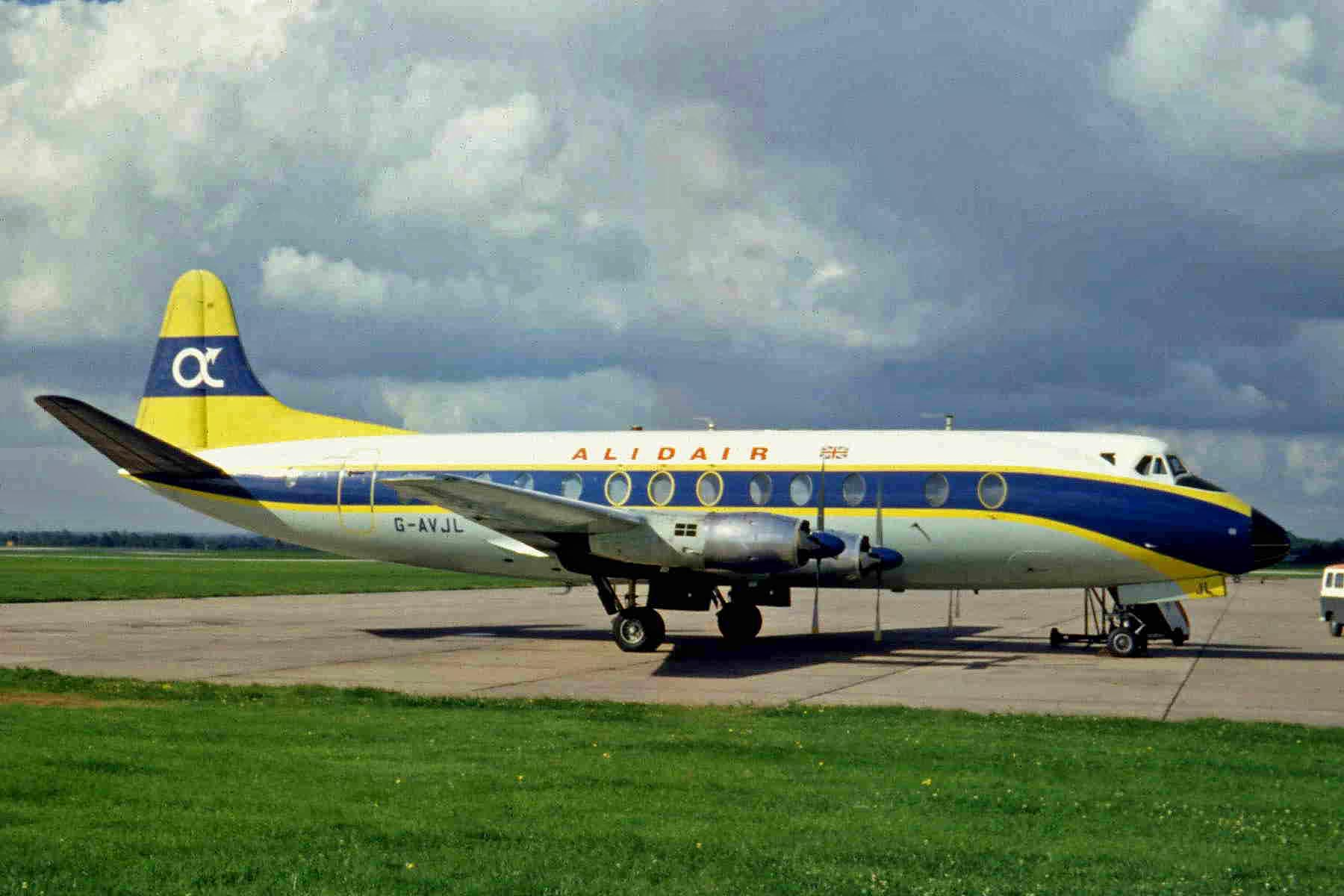
- Vickers Viscount 800
IATA	ICAO	Call sign
QA	—	—
- Founded: 1972
- Commenced operations: 1972
- Ceased operations: 1983
- Hubs: East Midlands Airport (EMA)
- Subsidiaries: Guernsey Airlines
- Fleet size: 7 at the end of operations
- Headquarters: East Midlands Airport (EMA)
- Key people: Roger Dadd founder and chairman; Trefor Jones director

Alidair is a passenger & cargo charter airline based in United Kingdom. It started with on-demand flights and then evolved into scheduled connections, also through a subsidiary.

== History ==
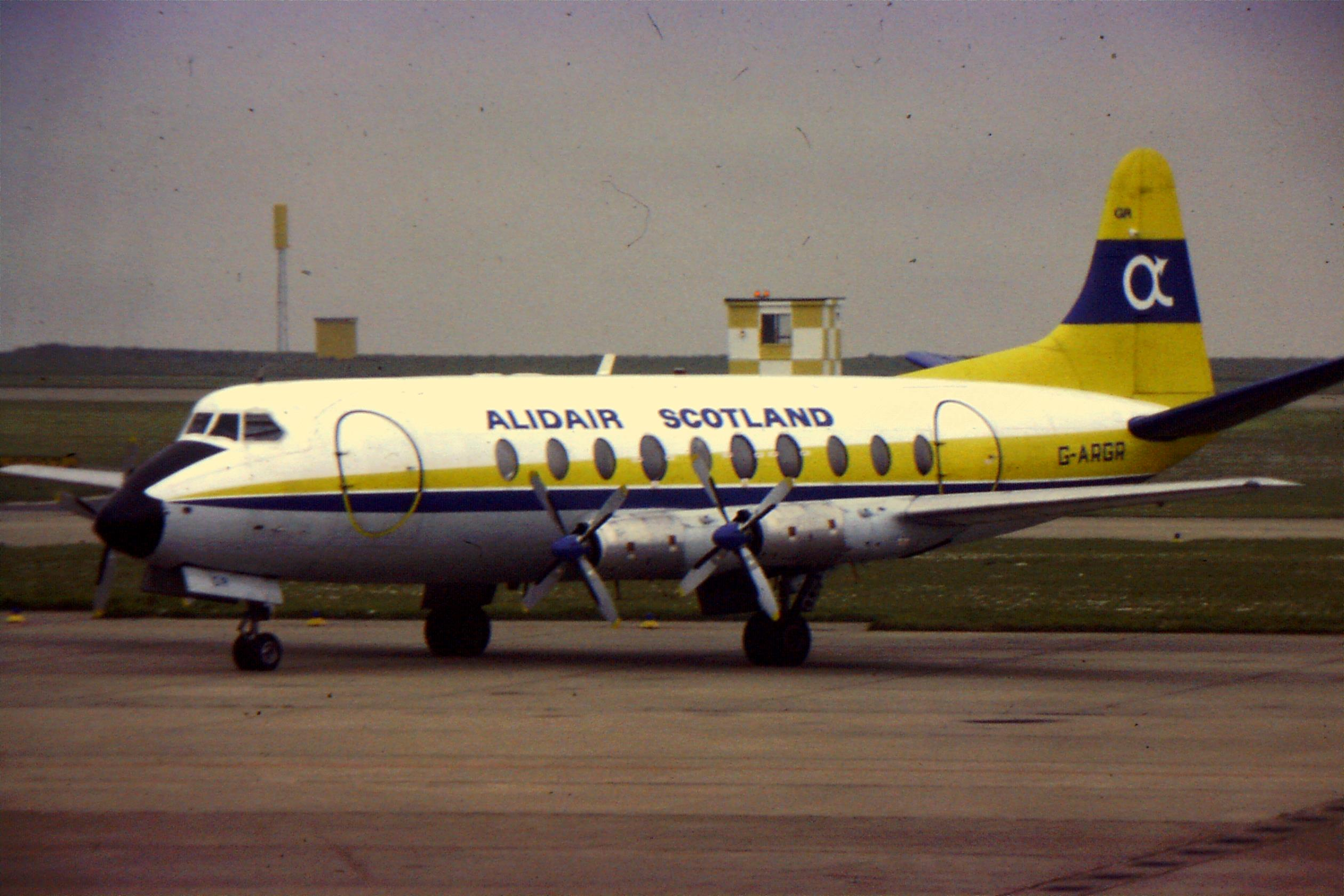
Vickers Viscount 700

In the summer of 1971, Alida Packaging purchased two Piper PA-30 Twin Comanches to transport executives. In November, a Beagle Pup was purchased as a recreational vehicle for company employees. In January 1972, Alidair Cargo was legally incorporated to transport goods from Hucknall Aerodrome (Nottinghamshire). The initiative was launched by pilot Roger Dadd, supported by two Midlands entrepreneurs. In April, a Vickers Viscount 800 was purchased, followed by two more. The Viscounts could carry 78 passengers in a single class or 7,000 kg of cargo. The operational base was moved to Castle Donington airport (EMA) because there were no customs services at Hucknall.

The first charter flight took place on June 12, carrying schoolchildren from Coventry to Graz. A related company, Alidair Holidays Ltd., began organizing day trips to destinations in Belgium, the Channel Islands, the Netherlands, and Paris. These activities continued throughout 1973 and 1974.

At the end of 1972, permission was requested to operate regular flights from East Midlands Airport and Birmingham to Copenhagen and Malmo. This was granted, and the first flight took place on April 30, 1973. However, demand was low, and the initiative ended at the end of the year. Charter flights from Coventry and Southend continued throughout the year.

In 1974, charter flights were organized by Clarksons (a global shipping company) to the Netherlands for the purchase of tulip bulbs by British floriculturists and gardening enthusiasts. In 1975, the first flights from Aberdeen to Scandinavia began on behalf of oil companies. For such five Viscount 700s were purchased, providing a better expense/income ratio. This made it possible to increase operations from Sumburgh Airport as well. In the late 1970s, Alidair Scotland titles were applied to the aircraft devoted to these charter flights.

On April 14, 1977, Guernsey Airlines, with its operations based in the Channel Islands, became a wholly owned subsidiary. Aircraft maintenance was entrusted to affiliate Alidair Aero Engineering, which later expanded its operations to include executive aircraft. However, financial losses were suffered since 1979 as a result of the world economic situation.

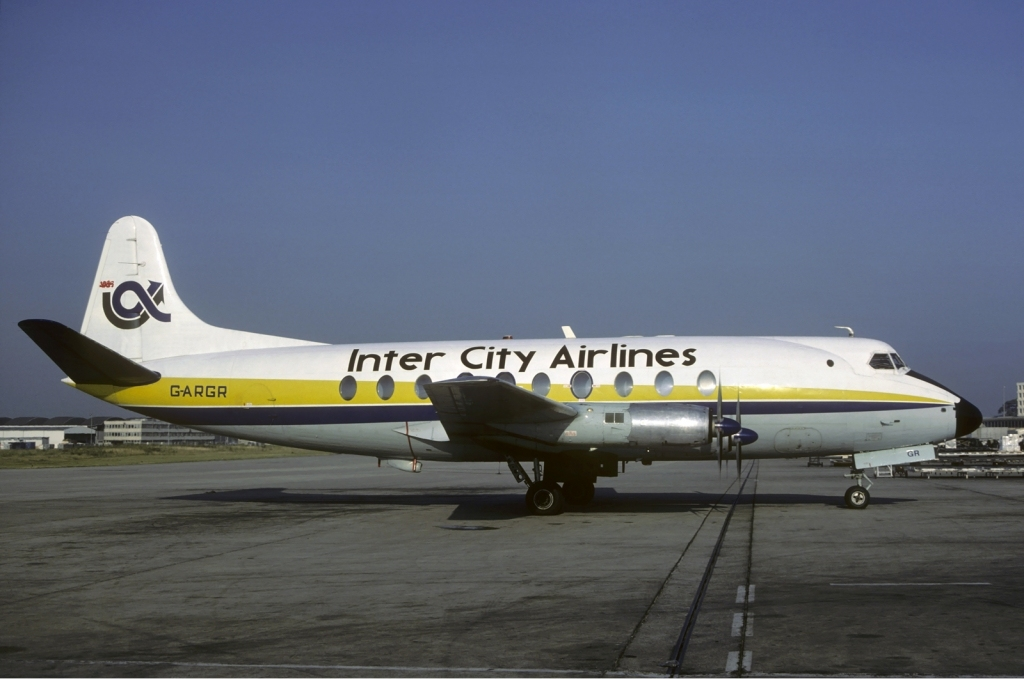
Vickers Viscount 700

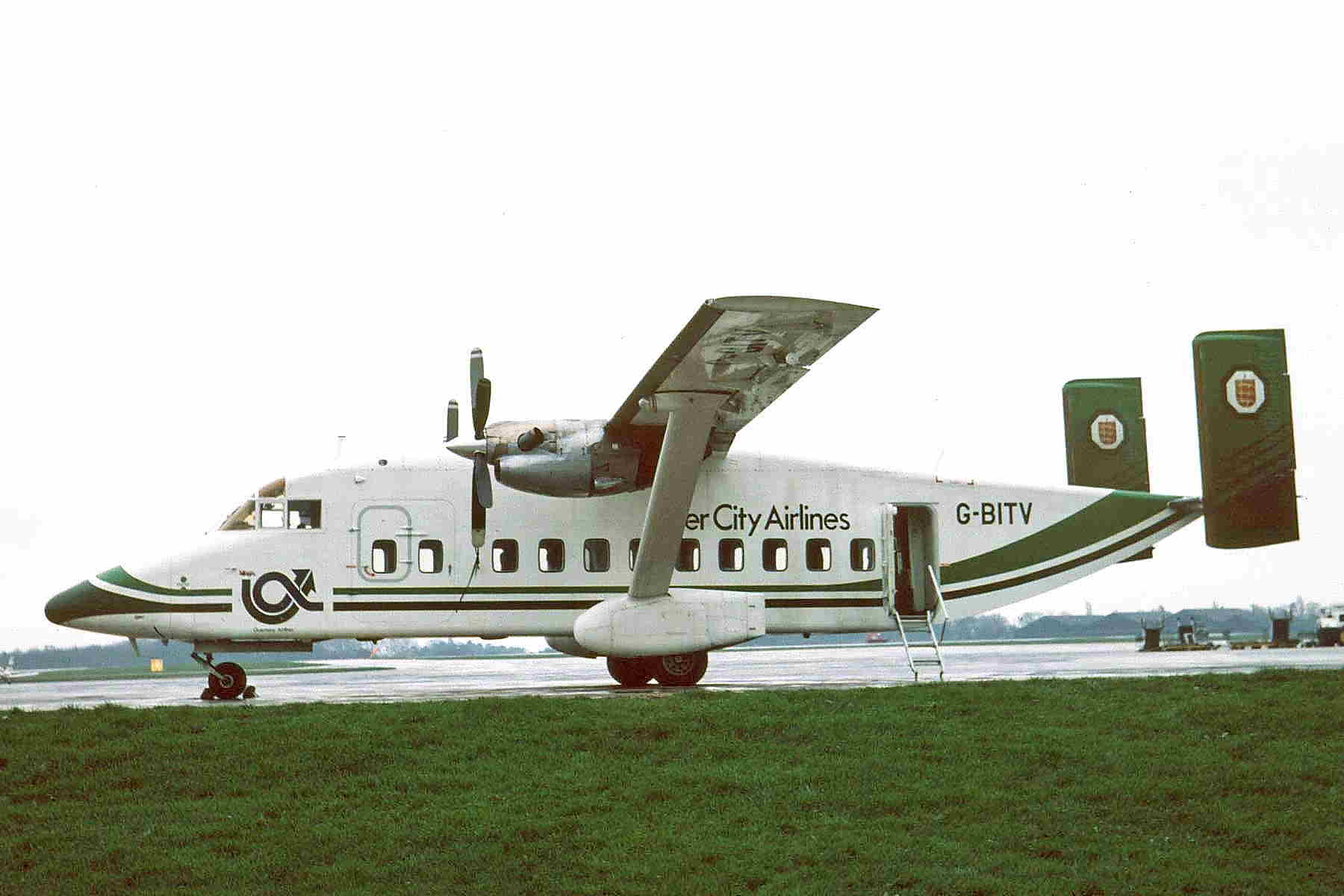
Shorts 330

On April 16, 1981, the first Shorts 330 was delivered to Inter City Airlines, the new commercial name adopted by Alidair. Scheduled flights resumed immediately, and the aircraft performed excellently on the EMA-Edinburgh-Aberdeen route. In fact, two more aircraft were soon added, followed by two Shorts 360s. These were also used by Guernsey Airlines from the Channel Islands to Manchester, Gloucester, and Cambridge. On November 4, the East Midlands-Brussels route was inaugurated.

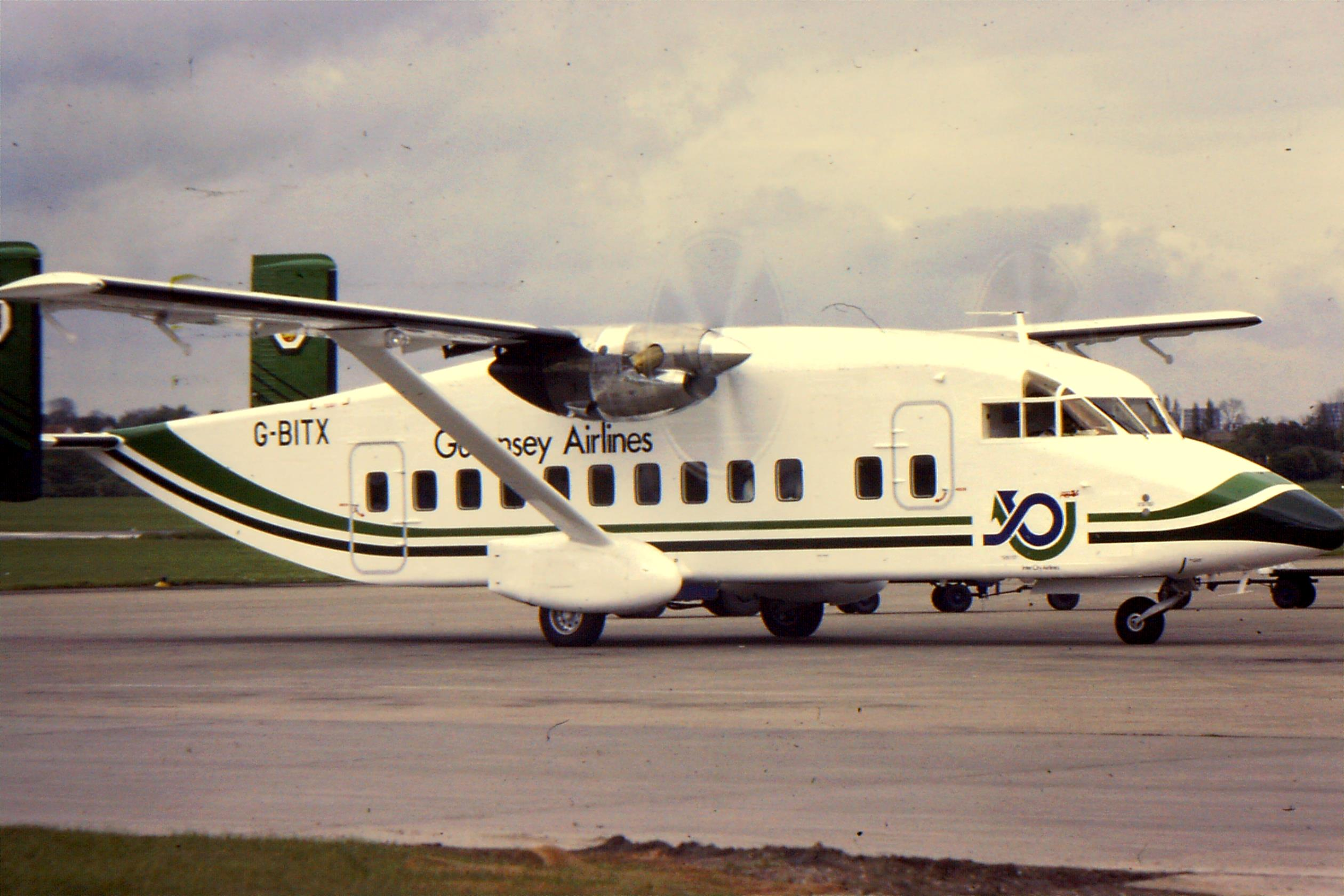
Guernsey Airlines Shorts 330

Despite this, the financial results remained negative and worsened after 1980. Despite the efforts of chairman Dadd and director Trefor Jones, the company ceased operations on July 29, 1983. Guernsey Airlines was sold to Jadepoint, Ltd., in August and went on as a British Air Ferries subsidiary.

== Fleet ==
Alidair/Inter City Airlines fleet consisted of the following aircraft types as of July 29, 1983:

- 2 x Piper PA-23
- 2 x Vickers Viscount 700
- 3 x Shorts 330
