= MacRobertson Miller Airlines Flight 1750 =

1968 aviation accident in Western Australia

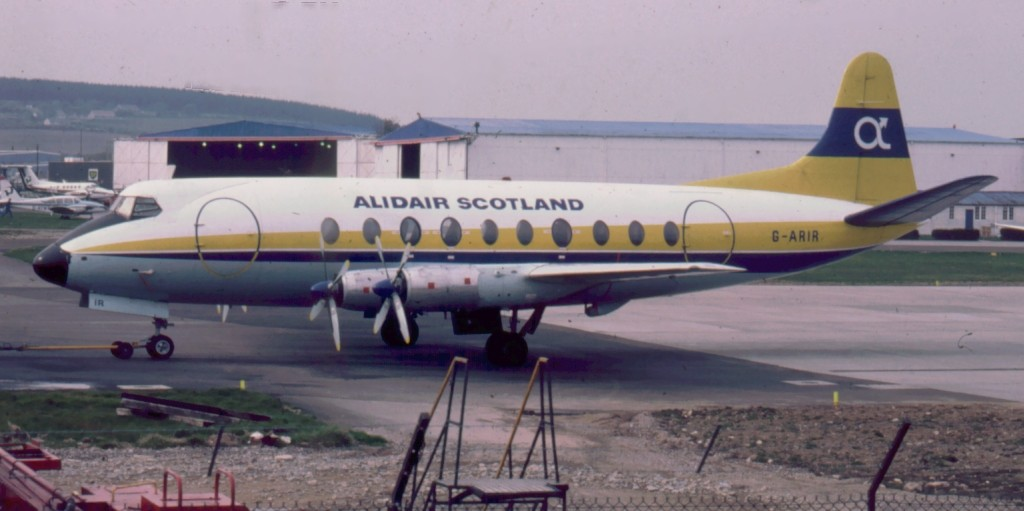
- Viscount 700 series similar to VH-RMQ

Accident
- Date: 31 December 1968
- Summary: Metal fatigue caused by maintenance error
- Site: 28 NM south of Port Hedland, Western Australia; 20.8457°S 118.5848°E

Aircraft
- Aircraft type: Vickers Viscount Type 720
- Operator: MacRobertson Miller Airlines
- Registration: VH-RMQ
- Flight origin: Perth Airport, Perth, Western Australia, Australia
- Destination: Port Hedland International Airport, Port Hedland, Western Australia, Australia
- Passengers: 22
- Crew: 4
- Fatalities: 26
- Survivors: 0

On 31 December 1968 a Vickers Viscount aircraft departed from Perth, Western Australia for a flight of 724 nautical miles (1341 km) to Port Hedland. The aircraft crashed 28 nautical miles (52 km) short of its destination with the loss of all twenty-six people on board. More than half of the right wing, from outboard of the inner engine to the wingtip, including the outer engine and its propeller, broke away from the rest of the aircraft in flight and struck the ground a significant distance from the main wreckage. Investigation by the Australian Department of Civil Aviation and British Aircraft Corporation concluded that a mysterious action during maintenance led to extensive fatigue cracking in the right wing spar. This accident remains the third worst in Australia's civil aviation history.

== The flight ==
MacRobertson Miller Airlines Flight 1750, a Vickers Viscount registered VH-RMQ, took off from Perth Airport at 8:36 am local time. On board were two pilots, two air hostesses and twenty-two passengers. (Note: Some sources specify 21 passengers and 3 air hostesses. One person on the flight was a trainee air hostess travelling as a passenger for the purpose of familiarisation training. She was travelling on a passenger ticket issued by the airline and was not assigned any of the duties normally carried out by the air hostesses.) The aircraft climbed to an altitude of 19,000 feet (5,800 m) for the 189-minute flight.

At 11:34 am the pilot advised that the aircraft was 30 nautical miles (56 km) short of its destination and passing altitude 7,000 feet (2,100 m) on descent to Port Hedland airport. No further radio transmission was received from the aircraft. Four seconds after completion of this transmission half of the right wing separated from the aircraft. Twenty-six seconds later the aircraft fuselage struck the ground.

As the aircraft was falling two people are known to have observed it from distances of 4.5 miles (7.2 km) and 6.5 miles (10.5 km) but because of intervening high terrain neither saw it strike the ground. When the crew of the aircraft failed to respond to further radio calls a Cessna 337 aircraft was despatched from Port Hedland airport at 12:12 pm to investigate. Eleven minutes later the pilot of the Cessna reported sighting the burning wreckage. A ground party from Port Hedland arrived at the accident site an hour later and confirmed that none of the occupants had survived the impact.

== Wreckage ==
The aircraft crashed on Indee Station on level rocky ground vegetated with spinifex grass and some stunted trees. Wreckage was spread over an area about 7,750 feet (2,360 m) long and 2,500 feet (760 m) wide.

Accident investigators immediately observed that half of the right wing, its outer engine and propeller were close together about 3,000 feet (910 m) from the main wreckage. The half-wing had been driven into the rocky ground by the impact but it was clear that the wing's main spar had fractured in flight causing immediate separation of the half-wing from the rest of the aircraft.

== Investigation ==
Detailed investigation of the two fracture surfaces showed that metal fatigue had caused cracks to grow across the lower boom (or lower flange) of the right wing's main spar until they affected approximately 85% of the cross-sectional area. With so much of the lower boom affected the wing could no longer support the weight of the aircraft, the lower boom suddenly broke in two and the outer half of the right wing separated from the inner half.

The mandatory retirement life of the lower boom in the inner wing was 11,400 flights. A pair of new inner lower booms had been installed in VH-RMQ in 1964 and had been in service for only 8,090 flights. The investigation concentrated on determining why the inner lower boom had failed at 70% of its retirement life.

The fatal fatigue crack in the inner lower boom had been initiated at a bolt hole at Station 143, the rearmost of five bolt holes for attachment of the inner engine nacelle to the lower boom. These holes were 7/8 inch (2.22 cm) diameter and were anodised to resist wear and corrosion. A cadmium-plated steel bush of length 1 5/8 inch (4.13 cm), chamfered at one end, was pressed into each hole. Each bush was an interference fit in the hole to improve fatigue resistance and substantially increase the retirement life of the inner lower boom. (Note: The interference was between .0015 and .0029 inch on diameter. The lengths of the bushes were slightly different, so as to accommodate the tapering thickness of the lower boom.)

The investigation determined that some years before the accident, the bush at Station 143 had been pushed upwards so the chamfer and 0.055-inch (1.40 mm) of the parallel-sided portion protruded beyond the upper surface of the boom. The exposed end of the bush was then struck with a conical tool applied to the bore. This action slightly flared the exposed end and left the external diameter 0.0038 inch (0.097 mm) oversize. The bush was then pushed upwards out of the hole and re-inserted from the lower surface. As the bush was being re-inserted its flared end broached the anodised material and a small amount of aluminium from the wall of the hole. This broaching action scored the wall of the hole and left its diameter slightly oversize so the bush was not an interference fit anywhere except at its flared end. Scoring of the wall of the hole and the absence of an interference fit left the inner lower boom vulnerable to developing fatigue cracks at Station 143.

Despite exhaustive investigation it was not possible to determine when, why, or by whom, the bush at Station 143 had been flared with a conical tool, removed and then re-inserted in the bolt hole. Investigators could not imagine circumstances in which a responsible tradesman would take these actions.

Approximately 5000 flights after new inner lower booms were installed in 1964, numerous fatigue cracks began to develop in both the forward and rear edges of the hole. These cracks eventually joined to form a single crack growing forwards from the forward edge of the hole, and a single crack growing rearwards from the rear edge of the hole. These two cracks grew to affect 85% of the cross-sectional area of the inner lower boom at Station 143.

Seven weeks after the accident the Minister for Civil Aviation, Reg Swartz, announced that the accident had been caused by metal fatigue and he did not consider it necessary to appoint a court to inquire into the accident. This position was challenged by the opposition spokesman for aviation, Charlie Jones.

British Aircraft Corporation (Note: The manufacturer of the aircraft, Vickers-Armstrongs, was absorbed into British Aircraft Corporation in 1960.) carried out multiple tests in which a bush was slightly flared with a conical tool and pressed into a hole in a test piece of the same aluminium alloy as the inner lower boom. Each test piece was then subjected to alternating stresses. These tests showed that eliminating the interference fit by insertion of a flared bush identical to the one found in the wreckage of VH-RMQ substantially reduced the mean life to failure of the boom – possibly by as much as 50%.

The investigation by the Australian Department of Civil Aviation was completed in September 1969 and concluded:

The cause of this accident was that the fatigue endurance of the starboard inner main spar lower boom was substantially reduced by the insertion of a flared bush at Station 143 when the margin of safety associated with the retirement life specified for such booms did not ensure that this boom would achieve its retirement life in the presence of such a defect.

When the Minister tabled the report in the Parliament in September 1969, Jones again called for a public inquiry.

== Aircraft ==
External image
- Eighteen photographs of the aircraft including one taken a month before the accident

The aircraft was a Vickers Viscount 720C manufactured in 1954 and assigned serial number 45. It was immediately acquired by Trans Australia Airlines and entered airline service in Australia as VH-TVB. In 1959 it appeared at that year's Farnborough Airshow. It was sold to Ansett-ANA in 1962 and re-registered as VH-RMQ. In September 1968 the aircraft was transferred to Western Australia and operated by MacRobertson Miller Airlines, by then a subsidiary of Ansett-ANA.

In 1958 the operator, Trans Australia Airlines, replaced both inner lower booms. In 1964 the new owner, Ansett-ANA, again replaced both inner lower booms. In February 1968 the aircraft became the first Australian Viscount to reach 30,000 flying hours. It was last inspected by Ansett-ANA in May 1968 when it had made 7,169 flights since the 1964 lower boom replacement. It made another 922 flights before the accident.

By 31 December 1968 the aircraft had made 25,336 flights and had flown for 31,746 hours. Since its previous complete overhaul it had made 6,429 flights and had flown for 7,188 hours.

== Recorders ==
The aircraft was equipped with a flight data recorder and a cockpit voice recorder. The flight data recorder functioned throughout the flight and continuously recorded the aircraft's pressure altitude, indicated airspeed, vertical acceleration and magnetic heading until the moment of impact with the ground. The cockpit voice recorder was slightly damaged in the impact and subsequent fire but there was no damage to the record of radio transmissions from the aircraft during the final 30 minutes of the flight. The record of ambient noise in the cockpit was also preserved and revealed the precise moment at which the frequency and volume of noise increased suddenly.

== Safe-life design ==
The wing of the Vickers Viscount used a single main spar made up of a centre section in the fuselage, two inner sections and two outer sections. The main spar comprised an upper boom, a shear web and a lower boom. The aircraft was designed and type-certificated to the principle of a safe-life. Before a component reaches its safe-life it must be removed from the aircraft and retired. At the time of the accident, the retirement life of the lower boom in the centre section was 20,500 flights; the inner lower boom was 11,400 flights; and the outer lower boom was 19,000 flights. The retirement life of the spars in the horizontal tailplanes and the vertical fin was 30,000 flights.

The retirement life of the wing spar of a transport category aeroplane type-certificated to the safe-life principle is based on a safety factor applied to data obtained from flight tests and information about properties of the spar material. The life of 11,400 flights for the Viscount inner lower boom was based on safety factors of 3.5 for the ground-air-ground cycle and 5.0 for fatigue damage due to atmospheric gusts. These safety factors were typical for this class of aeroplane. A 50% reduction of mean time to failure does not adequately explain why the inner lower boom in VH-RMQ should have failed before reaching its retirement life. In anticipation that the atmospheric gust spectrum in Australia may be more severe on the Viscount than the spectrum in some other climatic zones the gust spectrum was measured during 14,000 Viscount flights in Australia before 1961. The Department of Civil Aviation accepted the Viscount retirement lives as compatible with the atmospheric gust spectrum these aircraft would encounter during operations in Australia.

The airworthiness design requirements applicable to the Vickers Viscount and other safe-life transport category aeroplanes did not require retirement lives to be determined taking account of an unpredictable gross defect of the kind inflicted on the wing spar of VH-RMQ by insertion of the flared bush. Similarly, the airworthiness maintenance requirements did not require periodic inspection for fatigue cracking of the wing spars.

VH-RMQ was inspected by Ansett-ANA in May 1968, 922 flights prior to the accident, but it was not a requirement of this inspection that the wing structure be disassembled to allow access to the lower booms. Even if the wing had been disassembled it is unlikely the cracks radiating from the damaged bolt hole could have been detected.

Early in the life of the Viscount aircraft type, renewal of the inner lower booms included installation of new mount fittings for attachment of the rear of the two inboard engine nacelles to the lower booms. New fittings were supplied without pre-drilled holes and the holes were drilled during installation to correctly align the engine nacelle with the wing. However, after considerable in-service experience of the boom-renewal process British Aircraft Corporation amended the procedure to allow re-use of the engine nacelle rear mount fittings. Re-use of the old fittings relied on the existing holes aligning closely with the bushes in the new inner lower booms. When new inner lower booms were installed in VH-RMQ in 1958, new engine nacelle rear mount fittings were also installed but when new booms were again installed in 1964 the fittings first installed in 1958 were re-used. In the wreckage of the right wing of VH-RMQ there was evidence of an initial problem while trying to align the five holes in the old fitting with the bushes in the new boom. The bores of three bushes had been scored with a drill, possibly while maintenance personnel were trying to align three of the holes sufficiently to be able to insert the attachment bolts. (Note: This drilling removed .006-inch of material from the bore of the bush at Station 143. Two other bushes showed signs of drilling that had removed .006 and .015-inch of material respectively. The attachment bolts were 5/16 inch diameter.) Running a drill through the bush at Station 143 may have disturbed the bush and initiated a sequence of actions leading to fatal damage to the wall of the hole.

== Aftermath ==
Immediately after the accident the Department of Civil Aviation temporarily grounded all Australian-registered Viscount Type 700 aircraft. The temporary grounding of Australian-registered Viscounts was eventually made permanent, pending investigations into the cause of the accident.

Fatigue-failure of the wing of VH-RMQ immediately raised doubt about the validity of the retirement life of the inner lower boom in the Type 700 so British Aircraft Corporation and the UK Air Registration Board (ARB) took the precaution of reducing the life from 11,400 flights to 7,000. This soon resulted in British Aircraft Corporation obtaining a number of inner lower booms with time in service greater than 7,000 flights. Nineteen of these retired booms were examined in detail. Sixteen contained minor fatigue cracks in different critical locations. The longest crack was 0.054-inch (1.37 mm) in a boom that had been in service for 8,194 flights. This evidence convinced British Aircraft Corporation and the UK Air Registration Board that the inner lower boom did not possess the fatigue endurance originally intended so the precautionary life of 7,000 flights was made permanent.

When this accident occurred the number of fatalities made it Australia's third worst civil aviation accident, a status it retains to this day. Two civil aviation accidents caused 29 fatalities each – the 1950 Australian National Airways Douglas DC-4 crash and the 1960 Trans Australia Airlines Flight 538.

== See also ==
- Ansett-ANA Flight 149 – Viscount accident in 1966
- Ansett-ANA Flight 325 – Viscount accident in 1961
- Chalk's Ocean Airways Flight 101 – a crash where material fatigue within the wing structure led to a wing separating in flight
- List of disasters in Australia by death toll
- List of accidents and incidents involving commercial aircraft
- List of accidents and incidents involving airliners by location

== Bibliography ==
- ACCIDENT INVESTIGATION REPORT by Air Safety Investigation Branch, Department of Civil Aviation (15MB file)
- Job, Macarthur (1992). Air Crash Vol. 2, Chapter 14. Aerospace Publications Pty. Ltd. Fyshwick, Australia. pp. 200. ISBN 1-875671-01-3
- Operational history of aircraft C/N 45
