= Ansett-ANA Flight 149 =

1966 aviation accident

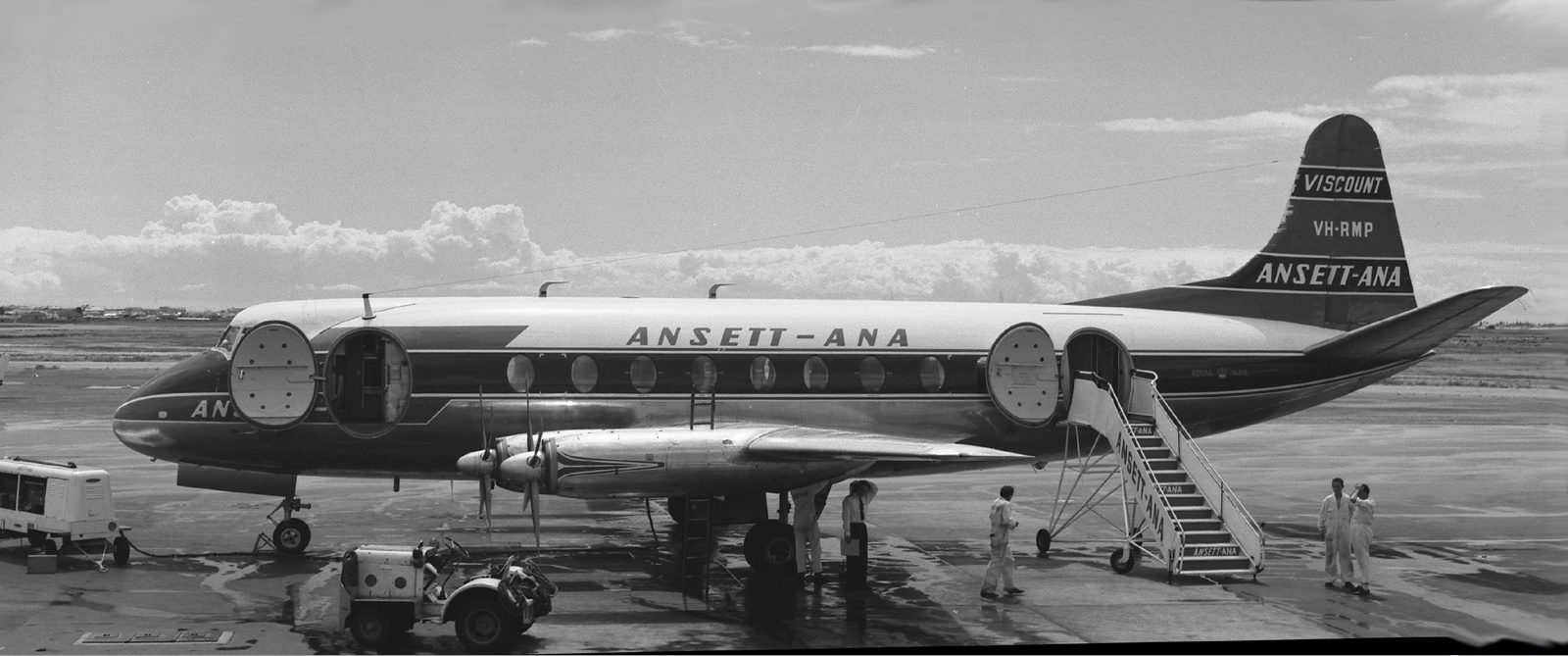
- Vickers Viscount similar to VH-RMI

Accident
- Date: 22 September 1966
- Summary: In-flight fire, wing failure
- Site: 19 km west of Winton, Queensland; 22.3798°S 142.8356°E

Aircraft
- Aircraft type: Vickers Viscount 832
- Operator: Ansett-ANA
- Registration: VH-RMI
- Flight origin: Mount Isa Airport, Mount Isa, Queensland, Australia
- Stopover: Longreach Airport, Longreach, Queensland, Australia
- Destination: Eagle Farm Airport, Brisbane, Queensland, Australia
- Passengers: 20
- Crew: 4
- Fatalities: 24
- Survivors: 0

Ansett-ANA Flight 149 crashed near Winton in Queensland, Australia on 22 September 1966, killing all on board. The Vickers Viscount aircraft departed from Mount Isa, Queensland, Australia for a 73-minute flight to Longreach. Forty-four minutes after takeoff a fire started in one of the engines. The crew were unable to extinguish the fire or feather the propeller so made an emergency descent with the intention of landing at Winton, a small town along the route. The fire spread to the fuel tank and weakened the wing structure so that a large part of the left wing broke away and the aircraft crashed. All twenty-four occupants were killed. The accident remains the fifth-worst in Australia's civil aviation history.

== The flight ==
Ansett-ANA Flight 149, a Vickers Viscount registered VH-RMI, took off from Mount Isa at 12:08 pm Eastern Standard Time and climbed to an altitude of 17,500 feet (5 334 m) for the flight of 316 nautical miles (585 km) to Longreach. On board were two pilots, two air hostesses and twenty passengers.

At 12:52 pm the Flight Service Unit at Longreach heard a radio transmission from the crew of Flight 149 saying they were making an emergency descent. (Note: The flight data recorder showed the aircraft reached 17,500 feet at 12:40 pm and descent was initiated at 12:47 pm.) Two minutes later the crew notified Longreach they had a fire warning for number 2 engine and had been unable to feather the propeller. At 12:59 pm Longreach received a message from Flight 149, relayed by the crew of a Douglas DC-3, (Note: The DC-3 was Trans Australia Airlines VH-AEQ flying between Longreach and Blackall.) saying fire in the engine nacelle was visible to the crew, and they were diverting to land at Winton airport, 92 nautical miles (171 km) from Longreach.

At 1:03 pm when only 13.5 nautical miles (25 km) from the airport (Note: 13.5 nautical miles from Winton airport on a bearing of 260° magnetic.) VH-RMI crashed on Nadjayamba Station and was engulfed in flames.

== Crash scene ==
Clouds of black smoke were observed by several people on agricultural properties to the west of Winton. One was a station hand working on the tower of a windmill. He was aware of the noise of an aircraft in the distance. The noise suddenly stopped so he looked up and saw a cloud of black smoke in the sky. Two burning objects were falling from the smoke towards the ground. When one of the falling objects struck the ground he saw a bright flash followed by a rising column of black smoke. A number of people in Winton observed the cloud of black smoke in the air to the west of the town, followed by two columns of dense black smoke rising from ground level.

The main wreckage, consisting of the forward fuselage, right wing, inner part of the left wing and number 2, 3 and 4 engines was badly burned. A short distance away were the tail and rear fuselage aft of the rear cabin door, both unburned and with little damage. Scattered about were bodies, passenger seats, pieces of cabin flooring, and sections of fuselage structure, some with cabin windows and cabin lining. The bodies of eleven of the passengers were unburned and still strapped to their seats. The bodies of the two air hostesses and three other passengers were found free of their seats. The bodies of six passengers and the two pilots were incinerated in the main wreckage. The outer part of the left wing and number 1 engine were about 900 yards (820 m) away from the main wreckage.

== Investigation ==
On the morning after the crash, a team of 22 members of the Department of Civil Aviation reached Winton to investigate the accident. The crash site on Nadjayamba Station was flat and dry, with only a few trees. The investigation was difficult because most of the aircraft was destroyed in the impact and subsequent fire. After two weeks of investigation at the crash site, most of the wreckage was catalogued and secured in crates. The crates were then transported to Melbourne, where an empty wool store was hired for the purpose of laying out all items of wreckage in their original position in the aircraft.

The aircraft was equipped with an early-model flight data recorder, so this was the first accident investigation in Australia to be aided by information from such a recorder. Housed in the forward belly locker, the recorder was damaged in the crash and subsequent fire, but it provided enough information to allow reconstruction of the Viscount's flight path until the moment of impact. The aircraft was not equipped with a cockpit voice recorder. (Note: Ansett-ANA equipped its fleet of Viscount aircraft with cockpit voice recorders in 1963. The performance of the recorders proved to be unsatisfactory and in early 1966 Ansett-ANA removed them and returned them to the USA for rectification.)

The investigation eventually determined that the rotors in the cabin pressurisation blower on number 2 engine began to break up, resulting in severe vibration that loosened the nuts securing the oil metering unit to the blower and allowed oil to escape freely. (Note: The Vickers Viscount is equipped with three cabin pressurisation blowers – one each on engines number 2, 3 and 4.) The rear bearing of one of the rotors also came free, so the rotor gyrated, causing metal-to-metal contact and great heat. The blower was located aft of the firewall, and a fire started in the rear of the nacelle when the escaping oil was ignited by contact with the hot metal in the damaged blower. The fire burned the engine control rods, preventing feathering of the propeller. Burning oil flowed into the wheel bay and from there into the leading edge of the left wing, where the fire breached the wall of a fuel tank. (Note: The fire spread to the No. 2 fuel cell in the No. 2 wing tank.) The abundant supply of fuel caused the fire to spread throughout much of the left wing and become so intense it caused softening of aluminium alloy and loss of strength of the upper boom (or upper flange) in the wing spar. The spar was critically weakened in the region between number 1 and 2 engines.

With the aircraft at a height between 3,500 feet (1 067 m) and 4,000 feet (1 220 m) the outer part of the left wing folded upwards and the remainder of the aircraft rolled to the left to meet it. The propeller of number 1 engine slashed the roof of the cabin before the detached part of the left wing separated from the remainder of the aircraft. With the roof slashed open, the airstream entered the fuselage and peeled away large segments of the cabin roof. The fuselage disintegrated aft of the propeller slash. Passengers and passenger seats from the rear of the cabin were ejected into the airstream, some passing through the ball of fire created by fuel from the severed left wing. The tail and rear fuselage aft of the rear cabin door remained intact but broke away from the rest of the fuselage.

The investigation was the longest and most detailed of any aircraft accident investigation conducted in Australia. It concluded that the probable cause of the accident was:

The means of securing the oil metering unit to the no. 2 cabin blower became ineffective and this led to the initiation of a fire within the blower, which propagated to the wing fuel tank and substantially reduced the strength of the main spar upper boom. It is probable that the separation of the oil metering unit arose from an out-of-balance condition induced by rotor break-up but the source of the rotor break-up could not be determined.

When an oil metering unit was installed on a cabin pressurisation blower, locking wire was used to ensure the five securing nuts did not rotate and become loose. In the wreckage of number 2 cabin blower accident investigators found none of the nuts and no locking wire. The investigators believed that when the blower was last overhauled the oil metering unit may have been re-attached without locking wire securing the nuts. The blower was overhauled and then installed on VH-RMI in April 1966.

The investigation discovered that a couple of years earlier, fires had occurred in one of the cabin pressurisation blowers on a Vickers Viscount in Canada and another in the British West Indies. Both fires broke out after loosening of the nuts securing the oil metering unit to the blower. Both occurred during testing of the engine on the ground. At the time, the blower manufacturer was not advised. It was not until the crash of Flight 149 in Australia that the blower manufacturer became aware of the need for these cabin pressurisation blowers to be modified.

== Inquiry ==
A Board of Accident Inquiry was appointed to investigate all aspects of the accident. The board was chaired by Sir John Spicer of the Commonwealth Industrial Court. Ansett-ANA was represented by Walter Campbell, British Aircraft Corporation (Note: The manufacturer of the aircraft, Vickers-Armstrongs, was absorbed into British Aircraft Corporation in 1960.) by Gordon Samuels, and the Department of Civil Aviation by Edward Williams. The inquiry first sat on 26 April 1967 and concluded on 31 August 1967.

== Aircraft ==
External image
- Photograph of VH-RMI

The aircraft was a Vickers Viscount 832. It was ordered by Ansett-ANA in 1958, was assigned serial number 416 and made its first flight in April 1959. It was registered in Australia as VH-RMI and entered airline service in May 1959. At the time of the accident, its cabin was configured for 63 passengers.

The aircraft made 12,858 flights and flew for 18,634 hours since new. It flew for 6,586 hours after its last complete overhaul in February and March 1964.

A newly overhauled cabin pressurisation blower was installed on the number 2 engine in April 1966. (Note: The cabin blower was overhauled in January 1966 and installed on number 2 engine on VH-RMI on 30 April 1966. By 22 September it had completed 14,427 hours since new, and 915 hours since overhaul.)

== Memorials ==
External image
- Photograph of memorial in Winton, plus 3 photographs of the crash site and 10 of VH-RMI

A year after the accident, a memorial was unveiled at the accident site on Nadjayamba Station, 12 statute miles (19 km) west of Winton. In 2006, on the 40th anniversary of the accident, a second memorial was unveiled on the main street of Winton.

== See also ==
- Ansett-ANA Flight 325 – Viscount accident in 1961
- MacRobertson Miller Airlines Flight 1750 – Viscount accident in 1968
- List of accidents and incidents involving airliners in Australia
- List of disasters in Australia by death toll

== Bibliography ==
- Job, Macarthur (1992). Air Crash Vol. 2, Chapter 14. Aerospace Publications Pty. Ltd. Fyshwick, Australia. pp. 200. ISBN 1-875671-01-3
- Spicer, The Honourable Sir John (1967). Report of Chairman of Board of Accident Inquiry on Accident to Viscount Aircraft VH-RMI Near Winton, Queensland on 22nd September, 1966. Commonwealth of Australia.
- ICAO Aircraft Accident Digest No. 16 – Volume II, Circular 82-AN/69 (73–84)
