= British European Airways Flight 411 =

1957 aviation accident

Coordinates: 53°21′59″N 2°15′12″W

- Wreckage of Flight 411

Occurrence
- Date: 14 March 1957
- Summary: Loss of control caused by metal fatigue in flaps
- Site: Wythenshawe, Manchester, England, United Kingdom
- Total fatalities: 22

Aircraft
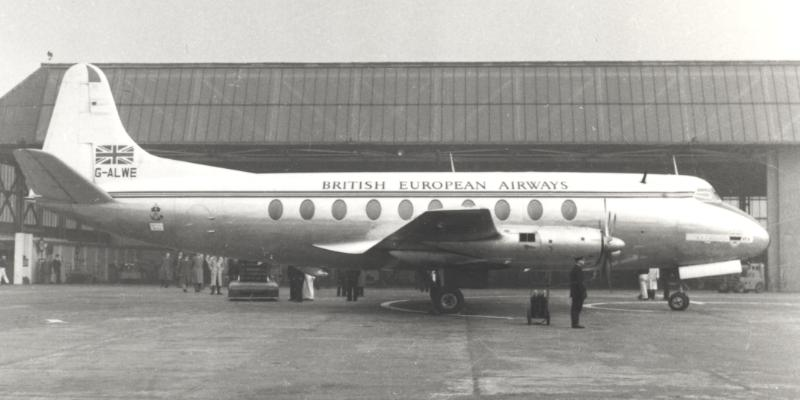
- G-ALWE, the aircraft involved in the accident, seen in 1953
- Aircraft type: Vickers Viscount
- Operator: British European Airways
- Registration: G-ALWE
- Flight origin: Schiphol International Airport, Amsterdam, Netherlands
- Destination: Manchester Airport, England
- Passengers: 15
- Crew: 5
- Fatalities: 20
- Survivors: 0

Ground casualties
- Ground fatalities: 2

British European Airways Flight 411 crashed on approach to Manchester Airport after a flight from Amsterdam Schiphol International Airport on 14 March 1957 and hit a house in Wythenshawe. All on board, 20 passengers and crew, died in the crash as did two people in the house. The aircraft involved was a Vickers Viscount registration G-ALWE operated by British European Airways. The cause of the crash was metal fatigue in flaps causing loss of control.

== Aircraft ==
G-ALWE, RMA Discovery, was the first Viscount 701 type to be manufactured by Vickers in 1952.

== Final flight ==
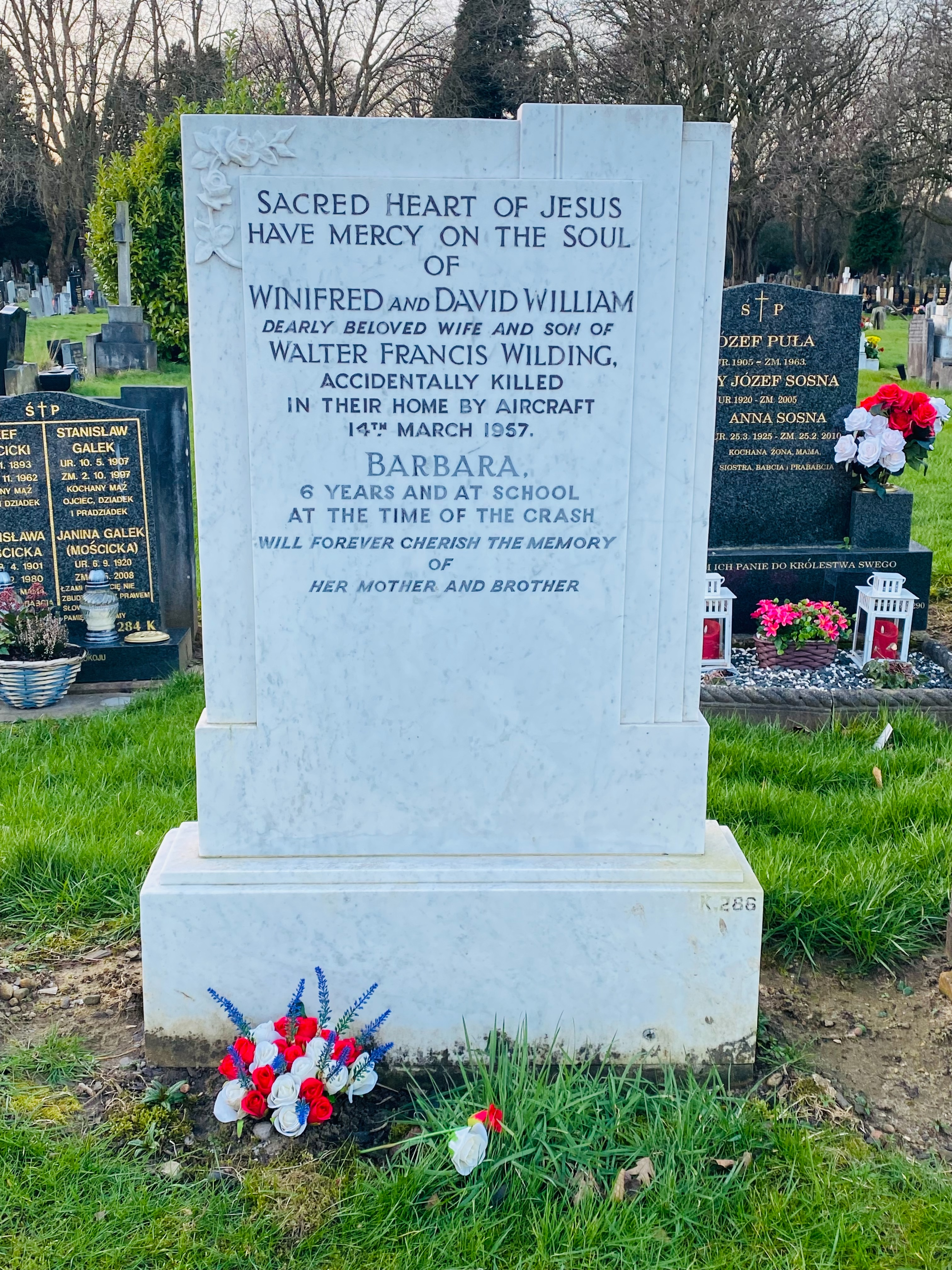
Grave of Winifred and David Wilding in Southern Cemetery, Manchester, the occupants of the house killed in the crash

Flight 411 took off from Amsterdam Schiphol International Airport. On board were 15 passengers and five crew members. At approximately 1.40pm GMT, 90 minutes after departure, flight 411 was cleared for approach into Manchester Airport. In low cloud and following a ground controlled approach the flight crew lowered the landing gear and turned into their final approach under visual control. One mile short of the runway eyewitnesses saw the aircraft turn into a shallow right descending turn with a steep bank angle. At 1.46pm the Viscount's right wing hit the ground and the rest of the plane broke up bursting into flames. It crashed into a house 85 yards beyond the impact point at the junction of Shadowmoss Road and Ringway in Wythenshawe. All 20 passengers and crew on the aircraft died in the crash and two occupants of the house also died.

A surviving occupant of the house that was destroyed was a former airport fireman at Ringway Airport, Wally Wilding. In the year before the crash, Wilding had launched a petition expressing concerns about the dangers of low-flying aircraft in the area. His wife and infant son both lost their lives in the crash.

== Investigation ==
The investigation into the crash of Flight 411 found that the probable cause of the crash was metal fatigue in the bottom bolt securing the starboard wing number 2 flap unit. The aileron locked when number 2 flap unit became detached from the wing trailing edge.

=== Aftermath ===
The investigation made several recommendations:-

1. That reliance on a single bolt in tension for the support of a primary structure should be avoided if possible.
2. That where such bolts are used an ample margin of strength should be allowed (having regard to the material of which the bolt is made) so as to ensure that fatigue will not develop at any time in the life of the bolt.
3. That where such bolts are used the seating of the bolt and nut should be carefully checked.
