= British Eagle Flight 802 =

1968 aviation accident in Germany

British Eagle International Airlines Flight 802
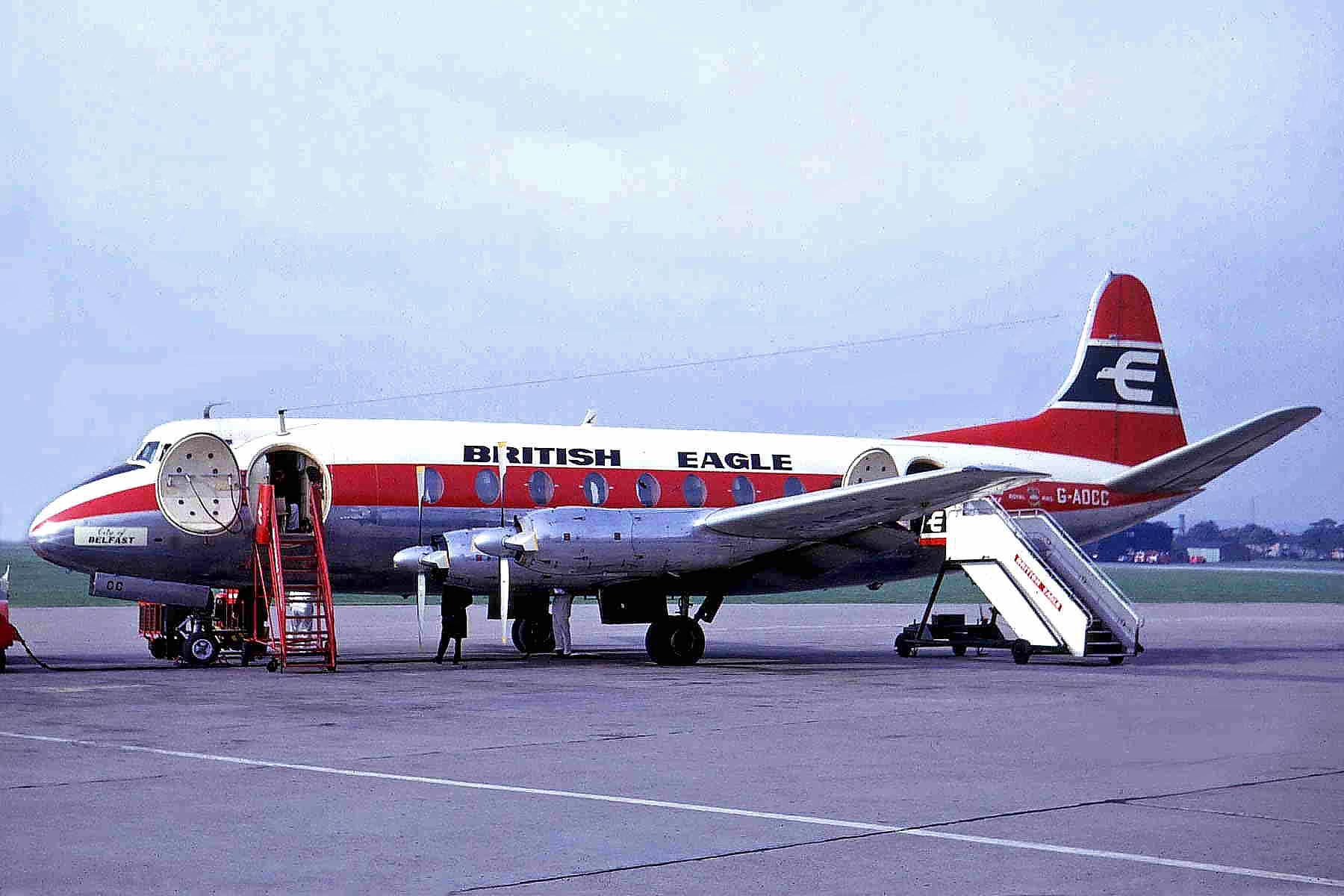
- A British Eagle Viscount, similar to the accident aircraft

Accident
- Date: August 9, 1968
- Summary: Loss of control due to total electrical failure
- Site: Near Langenbruck, West Germany

Aircraft
- Aircraft type: Vickers Viscount
- Aircraft name: City of Truro
- Operator: British Eagle International Airlines
- Registration: G-ATFN
- Flight origin: London
- Destination: Innsbruck
- Occupants: 48
- Passengers: 44
- Crew: 4
- Fatalities: 48
- Survivors: 0

British Eagle Flight 802 was a scheduled flight from London to Innsbruck. On August 9, 1968, the Vickers Viscount operating the flight had a total electrical failure. The crew began an emergency descent, during which the Viscount lost control, crashing into a highway. All 48 occupants onboard the aircraft were killed on impact.

== Aircraft ==
The aircraft operating the flight was a Vickers Viscount, serial number 394. It was built in 1958 for the Egyptian airline Misrair and sold to British Eagle International Airlines on September 3, 1965. Upon purchase it was registered as G-ATFN and named City of Truro. The aircraft had logged 18656 hours of flight with 10781 flights.

== Accident ==
Flight 802 reached its cruising altitude of 21,000 feet at 11:12 GMT. The aircraft entered Munich airspace at 12:52. Ten minutes later it passed waypoint 'Mike' and was cleared to descend to 12,000 feet. This clearance was not acknowledged by the crew, nor were any of the subsequent attempts to establish contact. Witnesses reported hearing a loud bang followed by the aircraft diving in a high speed turn. The bangs were the result of both wingtips and the left elevator breaking off due to aerodynamic forces. At 13:29 it impacted the embankment carrying the four-lane Munich-Nürnberg autobahn. The debris injured a bystander and damaged a car. All 48 on board were killed.

== Aftermath ==
Three months later, on November 6, 1968, British Eagle International Airlines stopped flying completely due to financial difficulties.

As a result of the crash, the British Aircraft Corporation (into which Vickers had been subsumed) made a number of modifications to aircraft systems and crew training drills to prevent this type of accident from happening in the future.

== Investigation ==
The accident was investigated by the German Office of Civil Aeronautics. It was determined that multiple systems, including instruments, radios and AC inverters were not energized at the time of impact, but all of the generators were running. The most likely scenario was all of the generators disconnecting. In the months before the accident, multiple electrical faults were recorded, including the generators tripping out several times, sometimes with no warning lights illuminating. This would have caused the entire electrical system to be powered off the battery only.

After 31 minutes the voltage would have dropped below 20 volts, with the very high frequency radio failing two minutes later. After 43 minutes the voltage would have dropped below 9 volts, with a voltage of 16 volts required to reconnect the generators. When the VHF radio failed the crew used the emergency 'communication failure' mode on the transponder, indicating they knew it had failed, but considering no action was taken to slow the drop of voltage, the warning lights for the disconnect of generators must not have worked, as otherwise there would have been sufficient time to take action and make an emergency landing.

The crew probably elected to continue the flight until their navigational aids failed, at which point they decided to descend below the cloud cover, not knowing it was only 1000 feet high. In the clouds most instruments would have failed, including the attitude indicators crucial for knowing the attitude of the aircraft. The attitude indicators would slowly become more and more incorrect as their gyroscopes slowed down. Without them it would have been impossible to control the aircraft.
