= 1983 Rhein-Main Starfighter crash =

Aviation accident in Germany

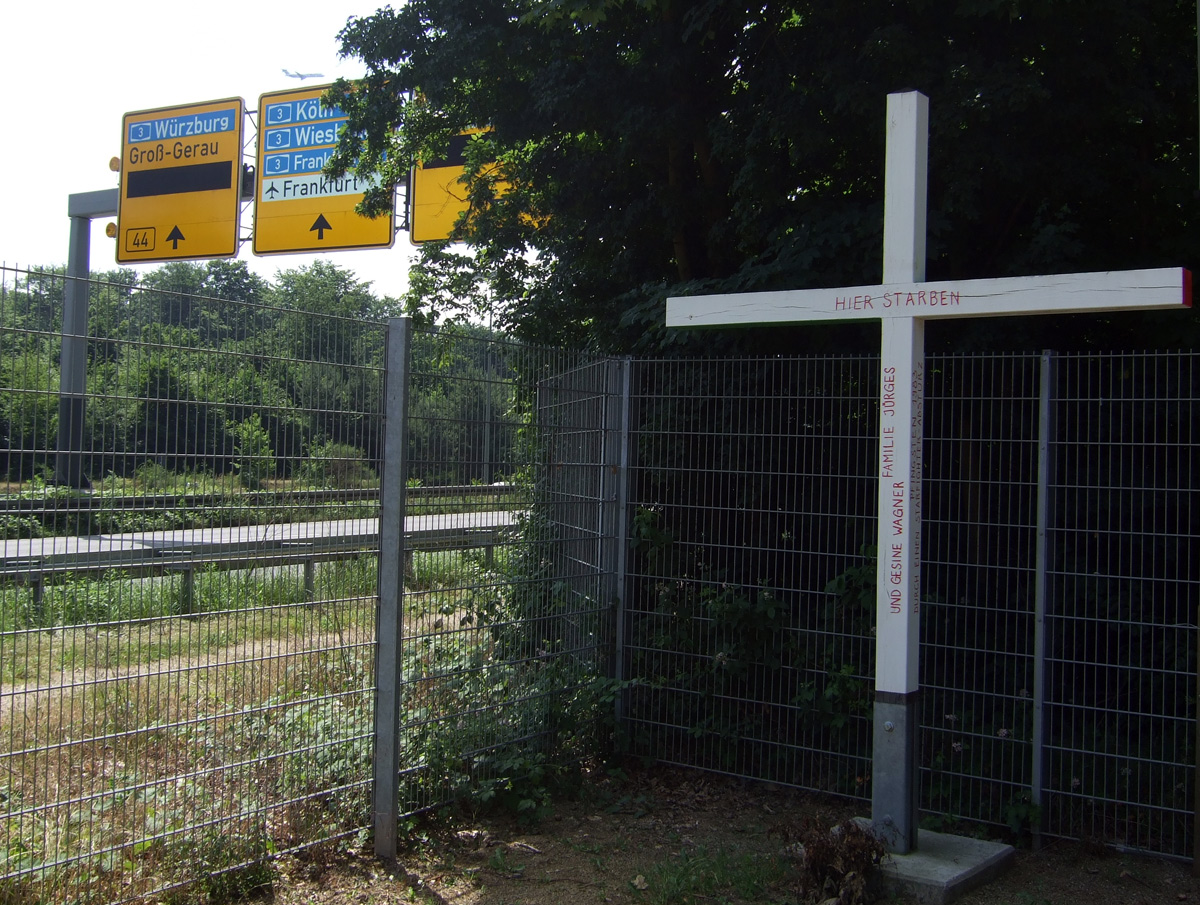
- A white, wooden cross in memory of the Jürges family killed in the Starfighter crash.

Accident
- Date: 22 May 1983
- Summary: Loss of control
- Site: near Rhein-Main Air Base; 50°04′01.0″N 8°39′03.2″E

Aircraft
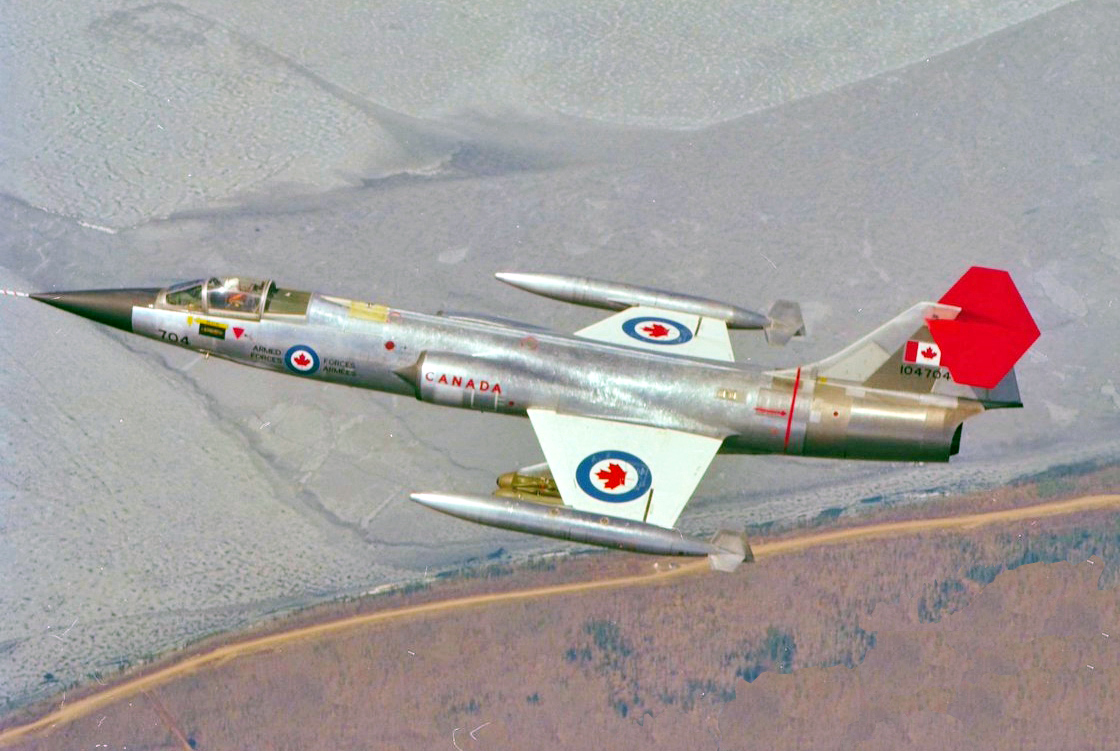
- A Canadair CF-104 Starfighter similar to the accident aircraft
- Aircraft type: Canadair CF-104 Starfighter
- Operator: Canadian Armed Forces
- Registration: 104813
- Flight origin: CFB Baden-Soellingen
- Destination: CFB Baden-Soellingen
- Crew: 1
- Fatalities: 6 (on ground)
- Survivors: 1 (pilot)

The 1983 Rhein-Main Starfighter crash happened on 22 May 1983, in connection with an air show at the Rhein-Main Air Base. A Canadian Armed Forces Canadair CF-104 Starfighter crashed on a nearby highway, killing six.

== Background ==
Pentecost is an extended holiday weekend in Germany in a row of three holiday weekends, with a lot of festival activities taking place. On 22 May 1983 in Frankfurt, the traditional "Wäldchestag" (forest day, albeit written in local dialect) drew people from the city into a forest area where a mobile fun park was erected. The tennis club near the soccer stadium Waldstadion held a tennis tournament and the Rhein-Main Air Base held a public open day air show. Part of the presentation was a display of formation aerobatics by Canadian Armed Forces Canadair CF-104 Starfighters (CF-104) from CFB Baden–Soellingen (Baden).

== Crash ==
Five CF-104s from 439 (Sabre-Toothed Tiger) Squadron CAF (439 Sqn) performed formation aerobatics. One of the aircraft left the formation, flew several kilometers northeast and crashed near the Waldstadion onto federal road 44.

The pilot was able to eject safely, but burning pieces of the airplane hit the car of Pastor Martin Jürges and his family, who were on their way to the Odenwald mountains for a day-trip. The family, Jürges himself (40), his wife Irmtraud (38), his mother Erna (77) and his children Jan (11) and Katharina (11 months) died at the scene of the accident. Jürges’ 19-year old niece Gesine Wagner managed to escape from the car, but was caught by the fireball of the exploding jet and burned extensively, dying on 11 August 1983, 81 days after the accident.

== Investigation ==
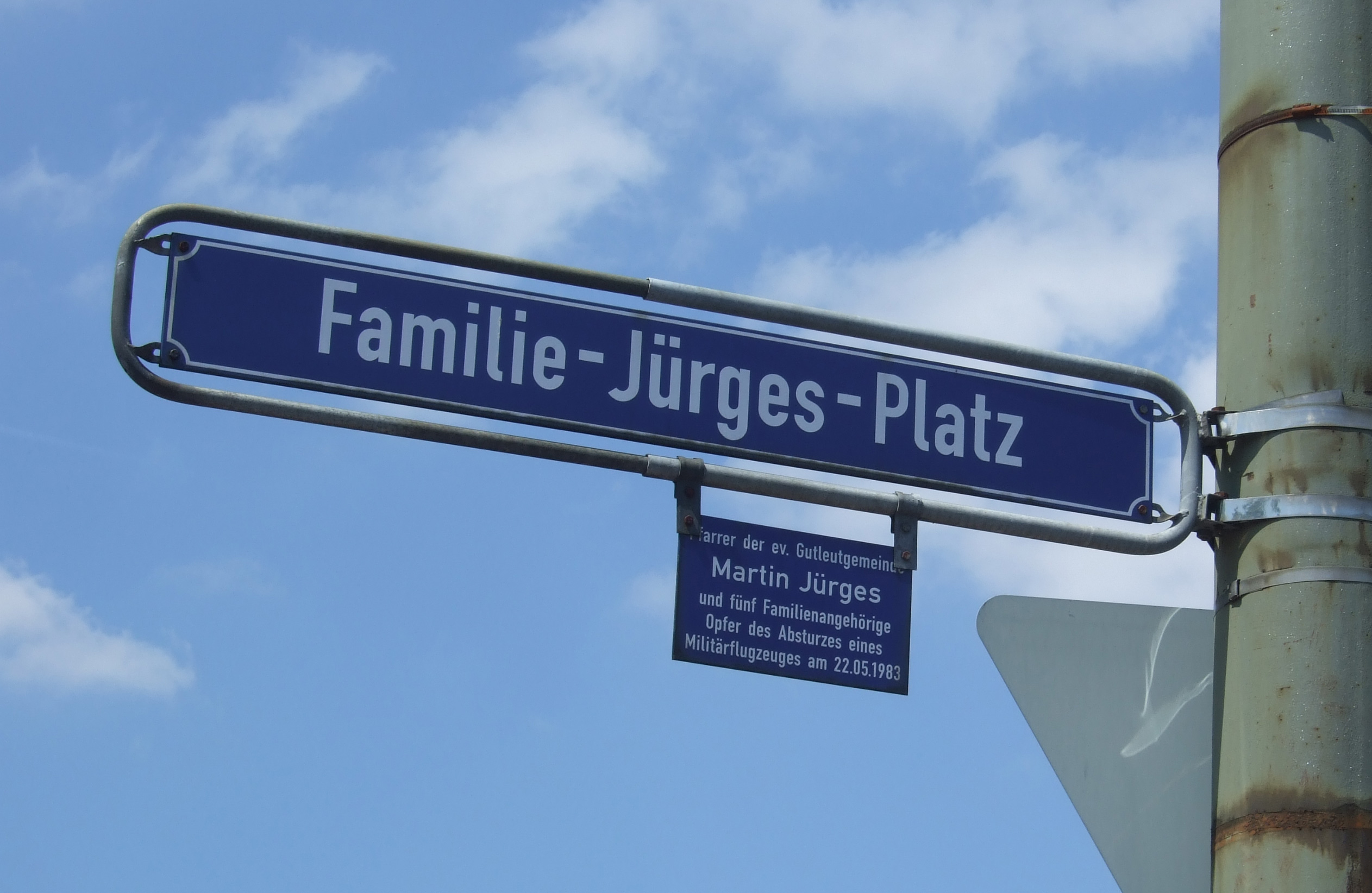
Familie-Jürges-Platz, Street sign

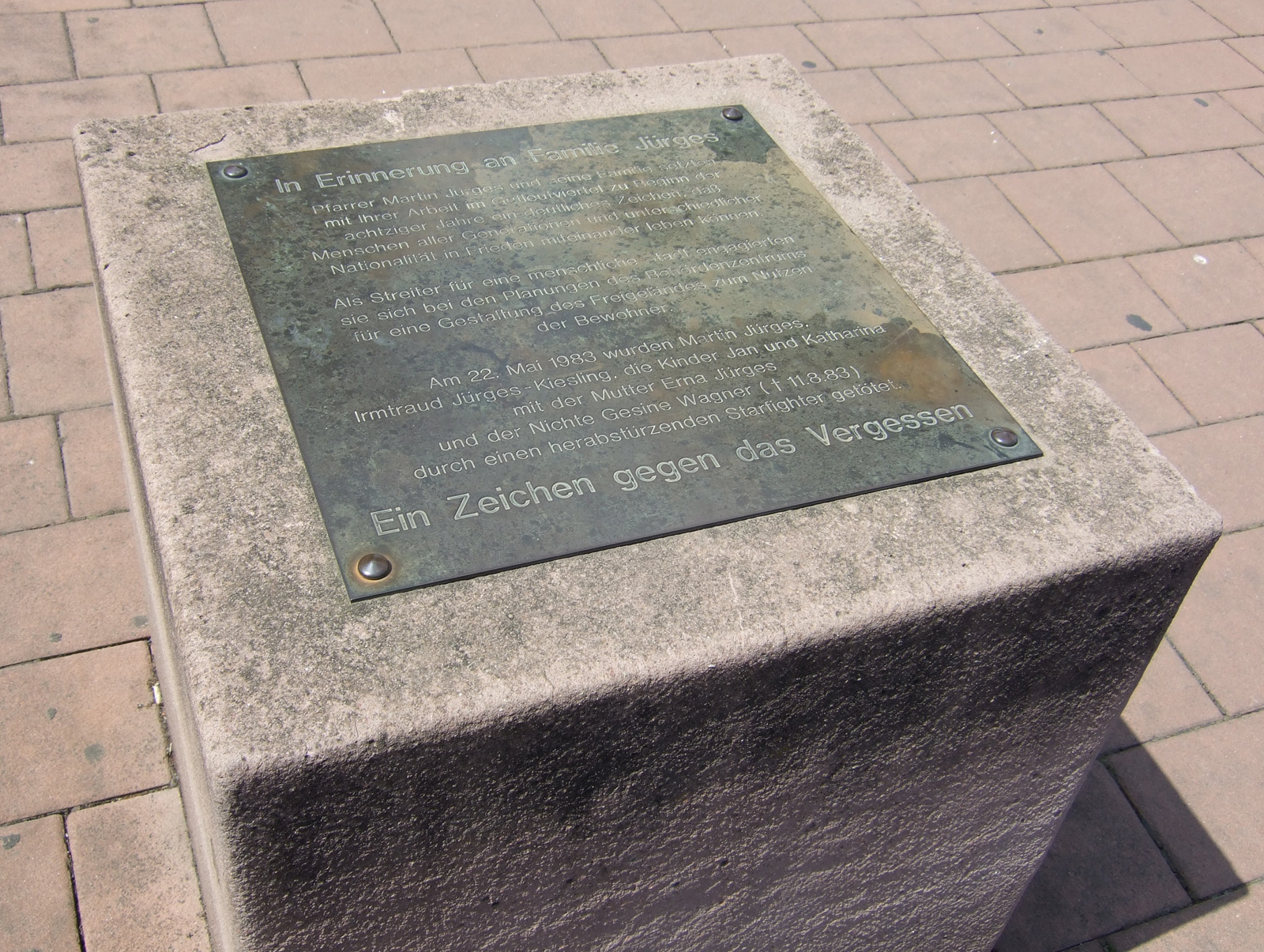
Plaque at the Familie-Jürges-Platz in Frankfurt.

Due to the NATO status of forces agreement the accident was investigated by the Canadian Department of National Defence. The state prosecutor in Frankfurt started, according to the rules, a cause of death investigation, but its investigation solely relied on the results of the Canadian investigation. Officially the results were only passed to the German state prosecutor as a press release, stating briefly that "neither technical failure nor human error" can be exempt as the cause of the accident. An investigation by the Hessischer Rundfunk in 2003 showed that although the leading state prosecutor had authority to question the pilot, he acceded to the Canadian accident report. Experts consulted reviewed the video evidence for the crash and concluded that human error by the pilot was to blame. The pilot in question, Alan Stephenson, has never commented on the disaster.

== Aftermath ==
It was soon realized that the crash could have caused many more fatal casualties, as the ongoing tennis tournament as well as the fun fair in the forest was just a few hundred meters from the crash site. As a result, the German defense ministry prohibited at first in general air shows in metropolitan areas which was later changed to prohibit air shows with jet airplanes in metropolitan areas.

During the 81 days in hospital Gesine dictated letters to her family and friends, which her parents published as a book.

In 2003, hr-fernsehen broadcast a documentary about the accident. According to the documentary, the owners of damaged cars were compensated fairly quickly after the accident. The parents of Gesine Wagner did not receive any support from officials while Gesine was in hospital or any condolences or compensation after her death.

A square in the Frankfurt district of Gutleutviertel – where Martin Jürges was pastor – is named after the Jürges family. A plaque commemorates the accident on May 22, 1983.

== See also ==
- 1955 Altensteig mid-air collision
- 1960 Munich C-131 crash
- 1964 Machida F-8 crash
- 1988 Remscheid A-10 crash
- Cavalese cable car disaster (1998)
- 2015 Shoreham Airshow crash
