= 1955 Altensteig mid-air collision =

Aviation accident in Germany

Coordinates: 48.5377°N 8.5427°E

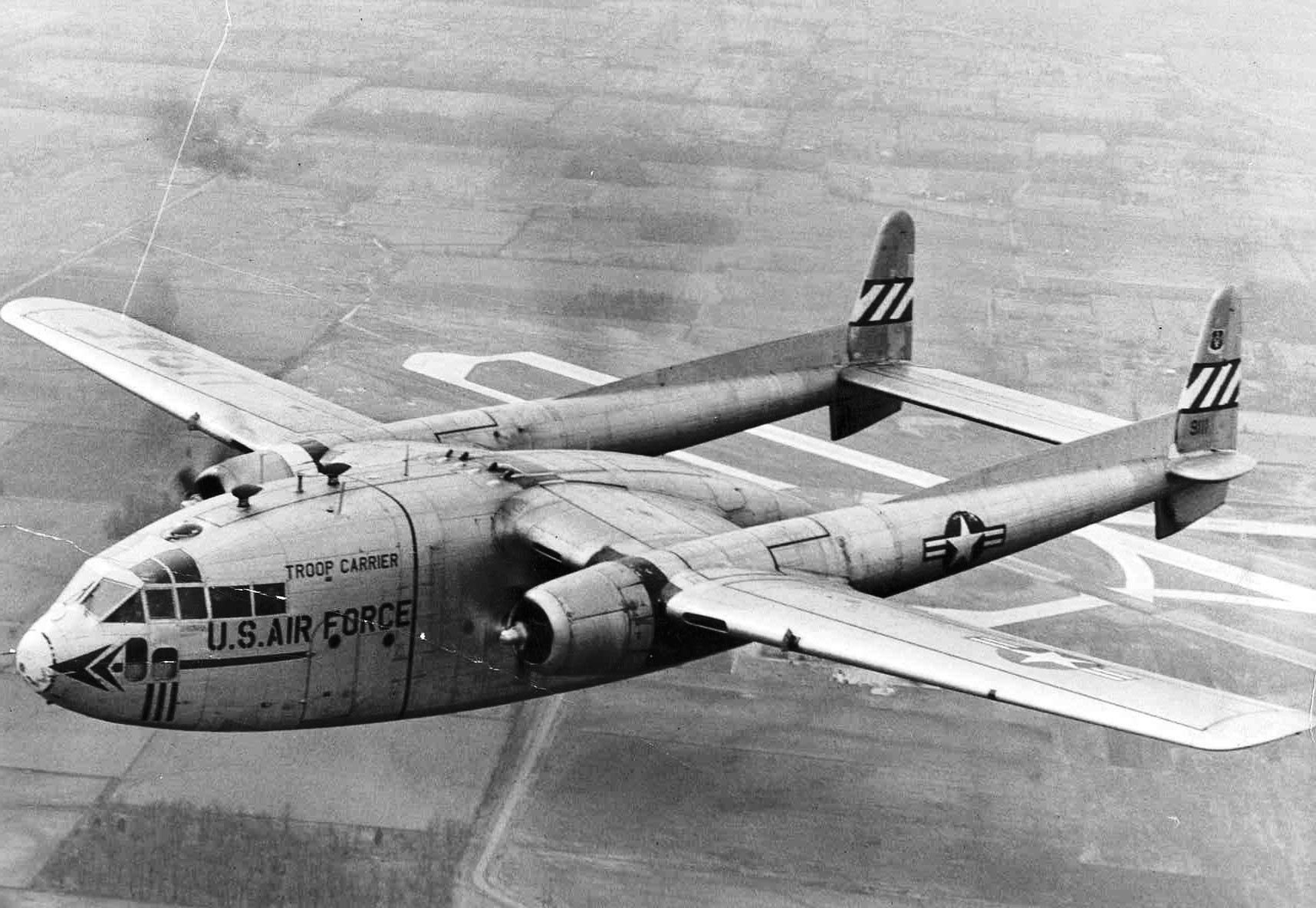
- A Fairchild C-119 similar to both aircraft lost

Accident
- Date: 11 August 1955
- Summary: Mid-air collision
- Site: Near Altensteig, West Germany
- Total fatalities: 66
- Total survivors: 0

First aircraft
- Type: Fairchild C-119G Flying Boxcar
- Operator: United States Air Force
- Registration: 53-3222
- Flight origin: Stuttgart Airport
- Destination: Stuttgart Airport
- Passengers: 14
- Crew: 5
- Fatalities: 19
- Survivors: 0

Second aircraft
- Type: Fairchild C-119G Flying Boxcar
- Operator: United States Air Force
- Registration: 53-7841
- Flight origin: Stuttgart Airport
- Destination: Stuttgart Airport
- Passengers: 41
- Crew: 6
- Fatalities: 47
- Survivors: 0

The Altensteig mid-air collision occurred on 11 August 1955 when two United States Air Force Fairchild C-119G Flying Boxcars collided and crashed three miles from Altensteig in West Germany. The aircraft were part of a formation of nine C-119s flying a training mission from Stuttgart-Echterdingen airfield, West Germany with troops from the United States Seventh Army. With all 66 on board both aircraft killed, it was, at the time, the deadliest air crash in Germany.

== Accident ==
Just after 14:00 one of the aircraft on the right of a formation of three developed engine problems just after takeoff, when it was around 4,000 feet; it lost height, then climbed abruptly into the second aircraft, colliding in mid-air. The first aircraft, serial number 53-7841, crashed and disintegrated with the loss of all 19 on board. The second aircraft 53-3222 continued for a while before it also crashed about 30 miles from Stuttgart in a wooded area and burst into flames, killing all 47 on board.

Helicopters were sent to the scene, supported by fire engines and people from local villages to help with the search for survivors, none were found and the fireman were still fighting the blaze into the evening.

== Aircraft ==
The two Fairchild C-119G Flying Boxcars were twin-engined military transport aircraft from the 60th Troop-Carrier Wing based at Rhein-Main airfield in West Germany.

== See also ==
- 1959 Okinawa F-100 crash
- 1960 Munich C-131 crash
- 1964 Machida F-8 crash
- 1977 Yokohama F-4 crash
- 1988 Remscheid A-10 crash
- Cavalese cable car disaster (1998)
