= 1968 Kadena Air Base Boeing B-52 crash =

Aviation incident in Okinawa, Japan

1968 Kadena Air Base B-52 crash
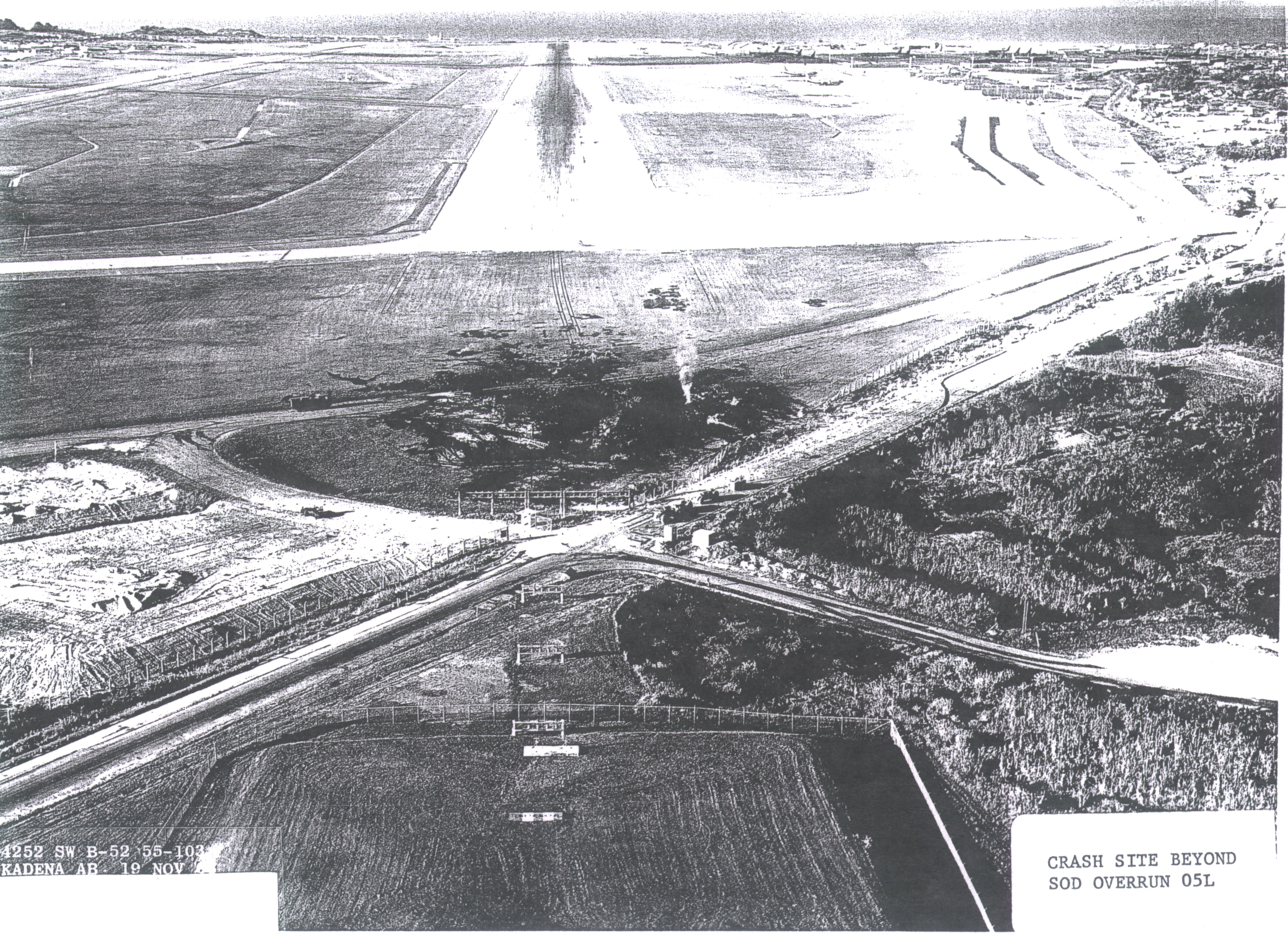
- The crash site of B-52 55-0103 at Kadena Air Base

Accident
- Date: 19 November 1968
- Summary: Aborted take-off with runway overrun
- Site: Kadena Air Base, Okinawa; 26°22′8.06″N 127°46′55.50″E

Aircraft
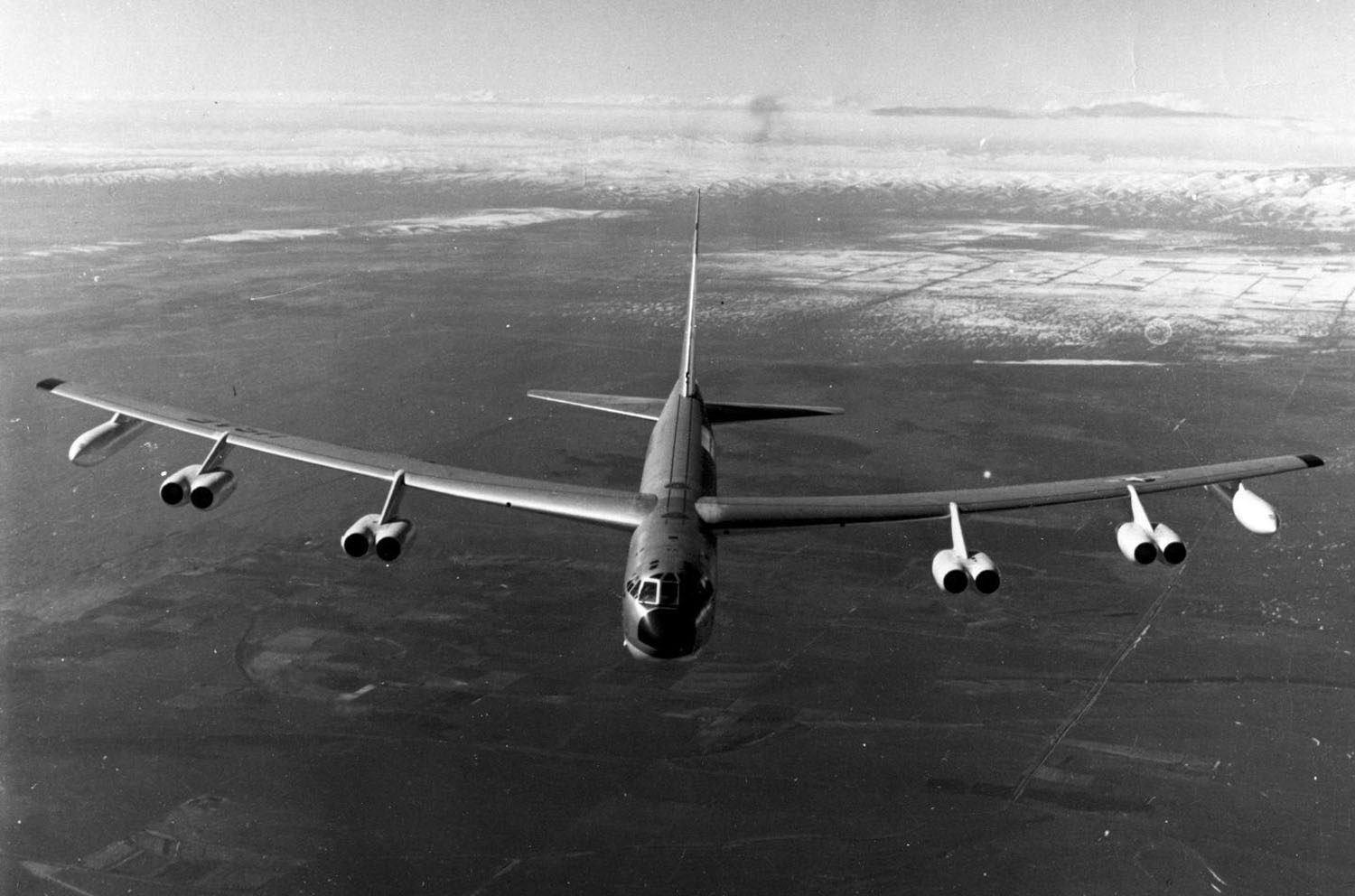
- A Boeing B-52 Stratofortress similar to the aircraft involved in the accident
- Aircraft type: Boeing B-52D Stratofortress
- Aircraft name: call-sign: "Gold 2" (or "Cream 2")
- Operator: United States Air Force (USAF), 4252d Strategic Wing (4252d SW )
- Registration: 55-0103
- Flight origin: Kadena Air Base
- Stopover: Operation Arc Light
- Destination: Kadena Air Base
- Crew: 7
- Fatalities: 2
- Survivors: 5

On 19 November 1968, a United States Air Force B-52 Stratofortress crashed at Kadena Air Base on the island of Okinawa, Japan.

== Aborted takeoff ==
The United States Air Force (USAF) Strategic Air Command (SAC) B-52D Stratofortress (serial number 55-0103) of the 4252d Strategic Wing had a full bomb load and broke up and caught fire after the aircraft aborted takeoff at Kadena Air Base while it was conducting an Operation Arc Light bombing mission to South Vietnam during the Vietnam War.

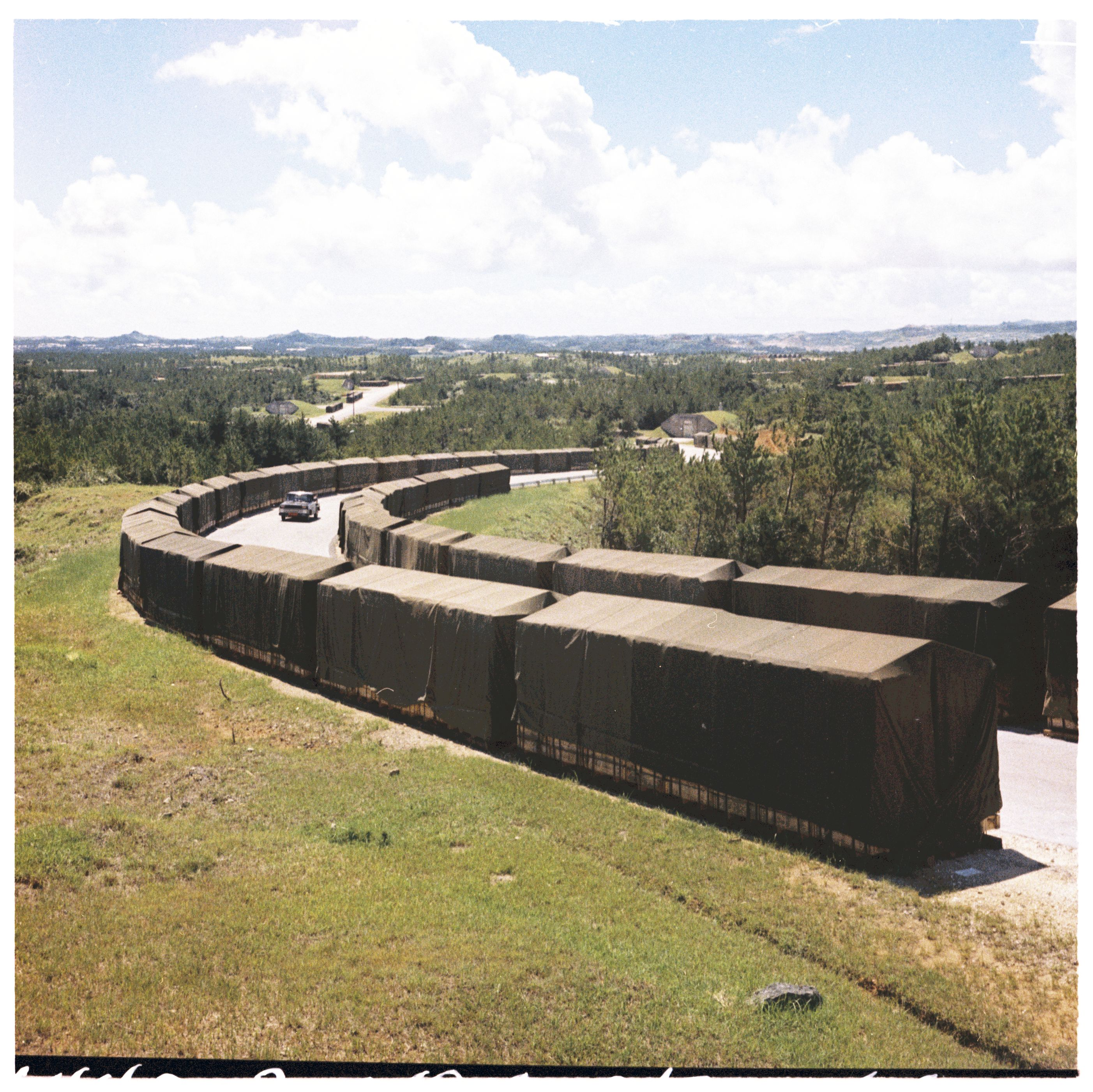
Tens of thousands of artillery projectiles at Chibana Army Ammunition Depot, September 1969

== Resultant fire and explosion ==
The fire resulting from the aborted takeoff ignited the aircraft's fuel and detonated the 30,000-pound (13,600 kg) bomb load of twenty-four 500 lb (230 kg) bombs, (twelve under each wing) and forty two 750 lb (340 kg) bombs inside the bomb bay and caused a blast so powerful that it created an immense crater under the burning aircraft some thirty feet (9 m) deep and sixty feet (18 m) across. The blast blew out the windows in the dispensary at Naha Air Base (now Naha Airport), 23 miles (37 km) away and damaged 139 houses.

== Recovery and investigation ==
The aircraft was reduced "to a black spot on the runway" The blast was so large that Air Force spokesman had to announce that there had only been conventional bombs on board. Nothing remained of the aircraft except landing gear and engine assemblies, the tail turret, a few bombs, and some loose explosive that had not detonated. Very small fragments of aircraft metal from the enormous blast were "spread like confetti," leaving the crew to use a double entendre to refer to the cleanup work, calling it, "'52 Pickup." The Electronic Warfare Officer and the Crew Chief later died from burn injuries after being evacuated from Okinawa. Two Okinawan workers were also injured in the blasts.

Had the aircraft become airborne, it might have crashed about 1/4–1/2 mi (400–800 m) north of the runway and directly into the Chibana ammunition storage depot. The Chibana depot stored ammunition, bombs, high explosives, and tens of thousands artillery shells and is now known to have held warheads for 19 different atomic and thermonuclear weapons systems in the hardened weapon storage areas. The weapons included W28 warheads used in the MGM-13 Mace cruise missile and W31 warheads used in MGR-1 Honest John and MIM-14 Nike-Hercules (Nike-H) missiles.

The storage depot at Chibana also included 52 igloos in the Project Red Hat chemical weapons storage area and presumably Project 112's biological Agents.

The crash led to demands to remove the B-52s from Okinawa and strengthened a push for the reversion from U.S. rule in Okinawa. Okinawans had correctly suspected that the Chibana depot held nuclear weapons. The crash sparked fears that another potential disaster on the island could put the chemical and nuclear stockpile and the surrounding population in jeopardy and increased the urgency of moving them to a less populated and less active storage location.

== See also ==
- Aviation accidents in Japan involving U.S. military and government aircraft post-World War II
- 1959 Okinawa F-100 crash
- 1964 Machida F-8 crash
- 1977 Yokohama F-4 crash
