= Cavalese cable car disaster =

Cavalese cable car disaster may refer to:

- 1976 Cavalese cable car crash
- 1998 Cavalese cable car crash
