= 1959 Okinawa F-100 crash =

Military aviation accident

Coordinates: 26°25′51.0702″N 127°49′36.9516″E

Okinawa F-100 crash
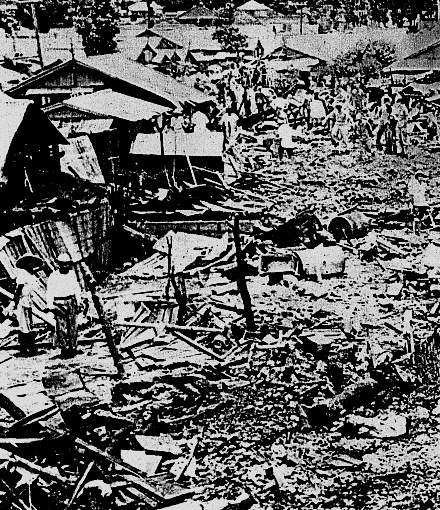
- The crash site in Ishikawa.

Accident
- Date: June 30, 1959
- Summary: Mechanical failure leading to in-flight fire
- Site: Ishikawa, Okinawa Prefecture

Aircraft
- Aircraft type: North American F-100 Super Sabre
- Operator: United States Air Force
- Registration: 55-3633A
- Flight origin: Kadena Air Base
- Passengers: 0
- Crew: 1 (survived)
- Fatalities: 18 (17 on ground, 1 known residual death)
- Injuries: 210 (on ground)

The 1959 Okinawa F-100 crash (Japanese: 宮森小学校米軍機墜落事故), also known as the Miyamori Elementary School crash (宮森小学校米軍機墜落事故), occurred on June 30, 1959, when a North American F-100 Super Sabre of the United States Air Force crashed in Ishikawa, in United States-occupied Okinawa, killing 18 people.

== Accident ==
At 10:40 a.m., a United States Air Force F-100D Super Sabre, piloted by 34-year-old Captain John G. Schmitt Jr. from Chalmers, Indiana, became uncontrollable during a training or test flight from Kadena Air Base located in the towns of Kadena and Chatan. Schmitt ejected from the aircraft, landing safely and unhurt. However, the F-100 crashed into Miyamori Elementary School and surrounding houses in the nearby city of Ishikawa, killing 11 students and 6 other people in the neighborhood, and injuring 210 others including 156 students at the school.

Immediately after the crash, troops of the armed police rushed to the accident site and worked on rescue operations. Most of the doctors residing in central Okinawa Island rushed to treat the victims. The fire caused by the accident was extinguished one hour later, with 27 buildings including 3 school buildings and 1 public building being destroyed, while 2 school buildings, 2 private houses and eight other buildings were half-destroyed. At the time of the accident, Miyamori Elementary School had about 1,000 children and teachers, with almost all children in the school taking a milk break at the end of the second hour of classes.

== Aftermath ==
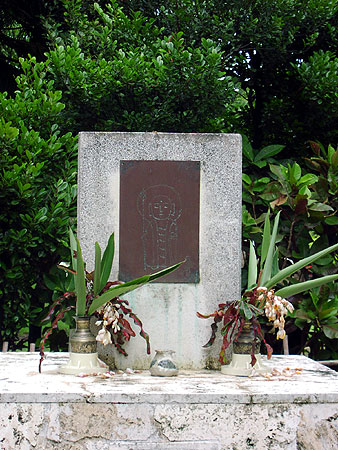
The memorial statue of the crash victims in Uruma.

The F-100 crash became a major tragedy in Okinawa as the victims were mostly very young schoolchildren, and contributed to increasingly ill-feelings towards the United States Civil Administration of the Ryukyu Islands from the Okinawan community. The crash led to fierce protests of anti-American sentiment in Okinawa, calling for the US occupation authorities to leave and for the islands to be returned to the control of the Government of Japan. The US military immediately launched a compensation scheme for victims, paying $4,500 for the dead and $2,300–5,900 for serious injuries depending on disability. The US military paid a total of $119,066 in compensation for the accident, but this amount was only about 10% of what the victims requested. The US authorities determined that the defective F-100 had experienced an engine fire despite recently undergoing repairs in Taiwan, and that Schmitt had attempted to aim the aircraft at an unpopulated hilly area before ejecting.

In 1965, a memorial statue for the victims of the disaster was erected at the crash site in Ishikawa.

In 1976, a former student at Miyamori Elementary School died at the age of 23 from complications related to burns caused by the crash 17 years earlier. Their death brought the sum of people killed in the F-100 crash to 18, and their name was added to the monument in 2010.

On June 30, 2009, 800 people, including former students of Miyamori Elementary and relatives of the victims, attended a 50th-anniversary memorial service at the crash site, now in the city of Uruma. Okinawa Governor Hirokazu Nakaima spoke at the ceremony, saying, "The Okinawa people of the time were deeply saddened by the accident in which the lives of children having dreams and hopes for the future were lost."

The F-100 crash and its aftermath were dramatized in the movie Himawari, directed by Yoshihiro Oikawa, completed in 2012.

== See also ==
- Tachikawa air disaster
- Daigo Fukuryū Maru
- 1955 Altensteig mid-air collision
- 1960 Munich C-131 crash
- 1964 Machida F-8 crash
- 1965 Philippine Sea A-4 incident
- 1968 Kadena Air Base B-52 crash
- 1977 Yokohama F-4 crash
- 1988 Remscheid A-10 crash
- Cavalese cable car disaster (1998)
