= 1988 Remscheid A-10 crash =

Airplane crash in Germany

- 1988 Remscheid A-10 crash site

Accident
- Date: December 8, 1988
- Summary: Crash during low-altitude flight
- Site: Remscheid, West Germany; 51°11′11″N 7°09′38″E

Aircraft
- Aircraft type: A-10 Thunderbolt II
- Operator: United States Air Force
- Registration: 81-0957
- Flight origin: Nörvenich Air Base
- Occupants: 1
- Passengers: 0
- Crew: 1
- Fatalities: 1
- Survivors: 0

Ground casualties
- Ground fatalities: 6
- Ground injuries: 50

The 1988 Remscheid A-10 crash occurred on December 8, 1988, when an A-10 Thunderbolt II attack jet of the United States Air Forces in Europe crashed into a residential area in the city of Remscheid, West Germany. The aircraft crashed into the upper floor of an apartment complex. In addition to the pilot, six people were killed. Fifty others were injured, many of them seriously.

The plane was engaged in a low-altitude flight exercise. It belonged to a unit from Bentwaters Air Base but at the time of the accident was stationed at Nörvenich Air Base, a so-called Forward Operation Location (FOL).

The flight leader, Captain Marke F. Gibson, was leading his flight followed by his wingman, Captain Michael P. Foster.

The cause of the accident was attributed to spatial disorientation, after both planes encountered difficult and adverse weather conditions for visual flying. Captain Gibson was able to maneuver his aircraft to safety, but Captain Foster's aircraft crashed into the houses on Stockder Strasse.

== Aftermath ==
When the number of cancer cases in the vicinity of the accident rose disproportionately in the years after, suspicion rose that the jet, contrary to US statements, may have been loaded with ammunition containing depleted uranium. This was denied by the US military. Despite this, 70 tons of top soil from the accident scene were removed and taken away to a depot (which also happens to be standard procedure for cleanup when a large amount of jet fuel is spilled on populated ground, such as in a plane crash). Also, film material taken during the top-soil removal showed radiation warning signs. 120 residents and rescue workers reported skin diseases, diagnosed as (toxic) contact dermatitis.

Damages accounted to approximately DM 13 million and were covered 75% by the U.S. Air Force and 25% by the West German government.

== Cause ==
The cause of the accident was attributed to spatial disorientation, after both planes encountered difficult and adverse weather conditions for visual flying.

== See also ==
- 1955 Altensteig mid-air collision
- 1959 Okinawa F-100 crash
- 1960 Munich C-131 crash
- 1964 Machida F-8 crash
- 1977 Yokohama F-4 crash
- Cavalese cable car disaster (1998)
