= 1998 Cavalese cable car crash =

1998 incident involving a US Marine Corps aircraft and a cable car in Italy

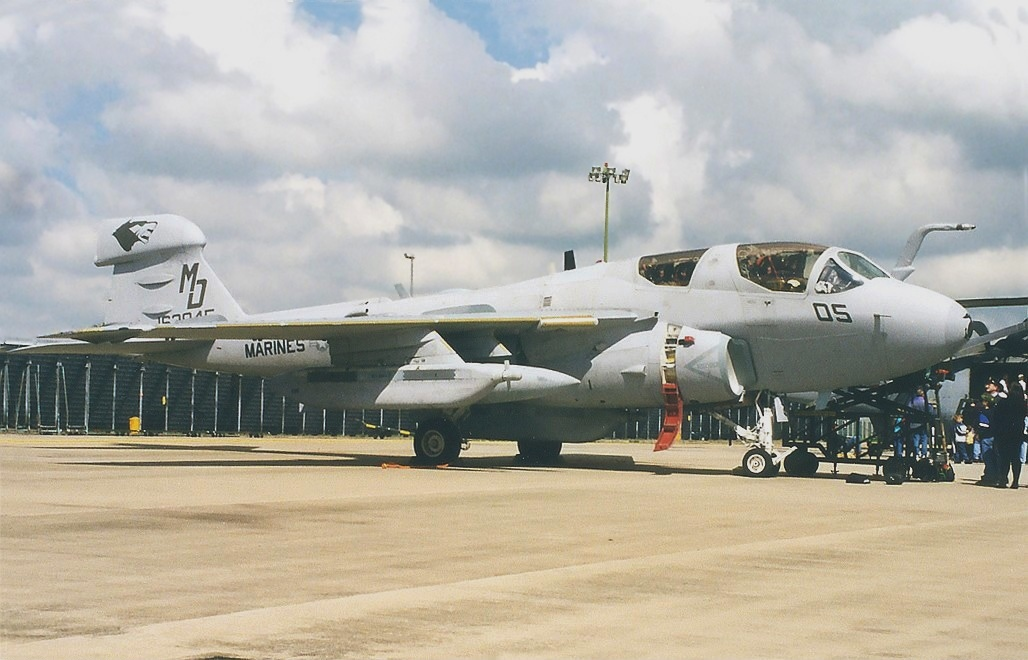
- EA-6B BuNo 163045, the aircraft involved in the accident, photographed in 1997

Accident
- Date: 3 February 1998
- Summary: Controlled flight into obstacle caused by pilot error
- Accused: Richard J. Ashby; Joseph Schweitzer
- Convictions: Obstruction of justice; Conduct unbecoming
- Site: Near Cavalese, Trentino, Italy 46.2837°N 11.4672°E

Aircraft
- Aircraft type: Grumman EA-6B Prowler
- Operator: United States Marine Corps
- Call sign: EASY 01
- Registration: 163045
- Flight origin: Aviano Air Base, Friuli-Venezia Giulia, Italy
- Destination: Aviano Air Base, Friuli-Venezia Giulia, Italy
- Occupants: 4
- Crew: 4
- Injuries: 0
- Survivors: 4

Ground casualties
- Ground fatalities: 20

The Cavalese cable car crash, also known as Strage del Cermis (lit. 'Cermis massacre'), occurred on 3 February 1998, near the Italian town of Cavalese, a ski resort in the Dolomites some 40 kilometres (25 mi) northeast of Trento. Twenty people were killed when a United States Marine Corps EA-6B Prowler aircraft, flying too low and too fast, against regulations, cut a cable supporting a cable car of an aerial lift.

The pilot, Captain Richard J. Ashby, and his navigator, Captain Joseph Schweitzer, were put on trial in the United States and found not guilty of involuntary manslaughter and negligent homicide. Later they were found guilty of obstruction of justice and conduct unbecoming an officer and a gentleman for having destroyed a videotape recorded from the plane, and were dismissed from the Marine Corps. The disaster, and the subsequent acquittal of the pilots, strained relations between the U.S. and Italy.

== Details of the disaster ==
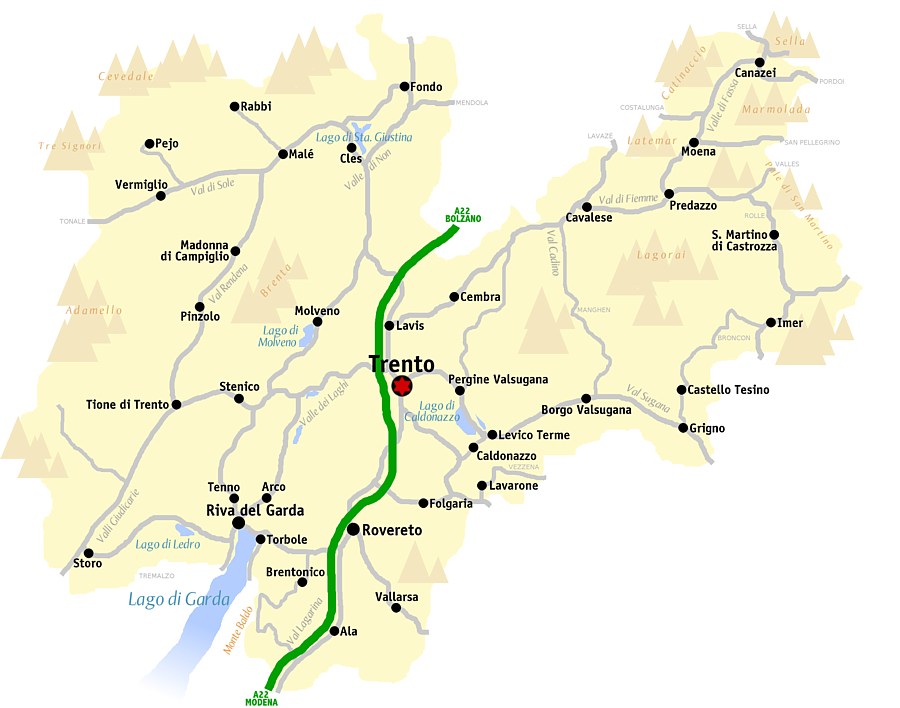
Map of Trentino, Italy; Cavalese is located in the north-east of the autonomous province

On 3 February 1998, an EA-6B Prowler, an electronic warfare aircraft belonging to Marine Tactical Electronic Warfare Squadron 2 (VMAQ-2) of the United States Marine Corps, was on a low-altitude training mission. At 15:13 local time, the aircraft struck the cables supporting the aerial lift from Cavalese. It was flying at a speed of 470 knots (870 km/h; 541 mph) and at an altitude of between 80 and 100 metres (260 and 330 ft) above ground level in a narrow valley between mountains. Its right wing struck the cables from underneath, severing them and causing cabin No. 1 from Cermis with twenty people on board to fall over 80 metres (260 ft), leaving no survivors. The plane had wing and tail damage but was able to return to Aviano Air Base.

=== Victims ===
| Nationality | Deaths |
|---|---|
| Germany | 7 |
| Belgium | 5 |
| Italy | 3 |
| Poland | 2 |
| Austria | 2 |
| Netherlands | 1 |
| Total | 20 |

Among the twenty killed, nineteen passengers and one operator, were seven Germans, five Belgians, three Italians, two Poles, two Austrians, and one Dutch.

== Reactions ==
U.S. President Bill Clinton offered an official apology and promised monetary compensation. Thomas M. Foglietta, U.S. Ambassador to Italy at the time, visited the crash site and knelt in prayer, offering apologies on behalf of the United States.

In Italy, where the event received the name of strage del Cermis, the low-level flight was strongly criticized and some politicians called for a re-evaluation of rules or a complete ban of such exercises, though low-level flight was already illegal.

== First trial ==
Italian prosecutors wanted the four marines to stand trial in Italy, but an Italian court recognized that North Atlantic Treaty Organization (NATO) treaties gave jurisdiction to U.S. military courts.

Initially, all four men on the plane were charged, but only the pilot, Captain Richard J. Ashby, and his navigator, Captain Joseph Schweitzer, actually faced trial, charged with twenty counts of involuntary manslaughter and negligent homicide. Ashby's trial took place at Marine Corps Base Camp Lejeune, North Carolina. It was determined that the maps on board did not show the cables and that the EA-6B was flying somewhat faster and considerably lower than allowed by military regulations. The restrictions in effect at the time required a minimum flying height of 2,000 feet (610 m); Ashby said he thought they were at 1,000 feet (305 m). The cable was cut at a height of 360 feet (110 m). Ashby further claimed that the altitude-measuring equipment, the altimeter, on his plane had been malfunctioning, and that he had been unaware of the speed restrictions. In March 1999, the jury acquitted Ashby, outraging the Italian public. The manslaughter charges against Schweitzer were then dropped.

== Second trial and re-examination ==
Ashby and Schweitzer were court-martialed a second time for obstruction of justice and conduct unbecoming an officer and a gentleman, because they had destroyed a videotape recorded on the plane the day of the disaster. The existence and destruction of this videotape only came to the attention of military investigators in August 1998; the other two members of the crew, Captains Chandler P. Seagraves and William L. Raney, received testimonial immunity and elected to disclose "the truth about everything".

Ashby and Schweitzer were found guilty in May 1999; both were dismissed from the service and Ashby received a six-month prison term. He was released after four and a half months for good behavior. Schweitzer made a plea agreement that came to full light after the military jury deliberated upon sentencing. His agreement prevented him from serving any prison time, but it did not prevent him from receiving a dismissal.

In their appeal, Ashby and Schweitzer asked for a re-examination of their trial and for clemency, challenging their dismissals in order to be eligible for military benefits. They claimed that during the first trial the prosecution and the defense secretly agreed to drop the involuntary manslaughter and negligent homicide charges, but to keep the obstruction of justice charge, in order to satisfy the requests coming from Italy. The appeal of Schweitzer was denied in November 2007. Decisions from the Court of Appeals for the Armed Forces were made available in August 2009.

== U.S. official report ==
In a formal investigation report redacted on 10 March 1998, and signed by Lieutenant General Peter Pace, the U.S. Marine Corps agreed with the results of the Italian officers. The investigation was led by General Michael DeLong, along with Italian Colonels Orfeo Durigon and Fermo Missarino. The document was kept secret until the Italian newspaper La Stampa legally obtained a copy from the U.S. archives and published it on 13 July 2011.

The Marine aircrew was determined to be flying too low and too fast, putting themselves and others at risk. The investigation team suggested that disciplinary measures against the flight crew and commanding officers should be taken, that the U.S. had to bear the full blame for what happened, and that victims' relatives were entitled to receive a monetary settlement.

The commission found that the squadron was deployed at Aviano on 27 August 1997, before the publication of new directives by the Italian government forbidding flight below 2,000 feet (610 m) in Trentino-Alto Adige. All the squadron's pilots received a copy of the directive. A copy of the directive was later found, unopened, in the cockpit of the EA-6B along with maps marking the cable car wire route. Directives were irrelevant here, since diving below cables was prohibited at all times regardless. In the report, the pilots are said to be usually well-behaved and sane, without any previous case of drug abuse or psychological stress. Nevertheless, on 24 January, they had received a formal warning for flying too low after a training takeoff.

On 2 February, Schweitzer planned the flight route for a low-altitude training mission using obsolete documents. It was proved that the squadron commander, Lieutenant Colonel Muegge, and his assistants, Captains Roys, Recce, Watton, and Caramanian, did not alert the navigator about the new flight altitude limitations, possibly because the proposed flight had a lower floor of 1,000 feet (300 m), enough to be safe with any cable in the area. The report included an interview with the commander of 31st Fighter Wing, who stated that Muegge confessed to him that he and his squadron, save Ashby, were aware of the current flight limitations. After approving the report, Pace suggested disciplinary measures be taken against the commanders as well.

On the morning of the disaster, the plane underwent maintenance for a fault in the "G-meter", which measures g-forces; the unit was replaced. The radar altimeter was checked and reported to be in normal condition. After the disaster, Ashby reported the altimeter never sounded a low altitude warning, but this is disputed and highly unlikely — at the time of the disaster, the altimeter was set to alert at 800 feet (240 m) and the plane had been flying at less than 400 feet (120 m).

Ashby was qualified for low-altitude flights and prohibited from diving below cables at all times. His last training mission of that kind was flown over six months before, on 3 July. The report includes flight tracing from a nearby AWACS airplane. The document reports a camcorder aboard the flight, but it was blank after Schweitzer had taken the original cassette and burned it afterwards. Schweitzer confessed in 2012 that he had burned the tape containing incriminating evidence upon returning to Aviano Air Base.

== Compensation ==
By February 1999, the victims' families had received US$65,000 (equivalent to $125,620 in 2025) per victim as immediate help by the Italian government. In May 1999, the U.S. Congress rejected a bill that would have set up a $40 million compensation fund for the victims. In December 1999, the Italian Parliament approved a monetary compensation plan for the families ($1.9 million per victim). NATO treaties obligated the U.S. government to pay 75% of this compensation, which it did.

== See also ==
- 1959 Okinawa F-100 crash
- 1960 Munich C-131 crash
- 1964 Machida F-8 crash
- 1968 Thule Air Base B-52 crash
- 1976 Cavalese cable car crash
- 1977 Yokohama F-4 crash
- 1988 Remscheid A-10 crash
- 1990 Italian Air Force MB-326 crash
- Cable car accidents and disasters by death toll
