= Papa Mama Bye bye =

Papa Mama Bye Bye
- パパ ママ バイバイ (Japanese)
- Directed by: Hiroshi Shitara
- Screenplay by: Yusaku Yamagata
- Story by: Katsumoto Saotome
- Cinematography: Sachio Katayama
- Edited by: Shigeru Chiba
- Production company: Toei Animation
- Release date: July 8, 1984 (Japan)
- Running time: 75 minutes
- Country: Japan
- Language: Japanese

Papa Mama Bye-Bye (パパママバイバイ) is a 1984 Japanese animated drama film adapted from a book of the same name. The plot is centered on the 1977 Yokohama F-4 crash.

== Plot ==
Kaori lives next door to brothers Ko and Yasu. One day, as Kaori is walking home from school, an American plane crashes into the boy's neighbourhood.
