= Cermis =

Mountain in eastern Trentino, Italy

Coordinates: 46°14′32″N 11°30′09″E

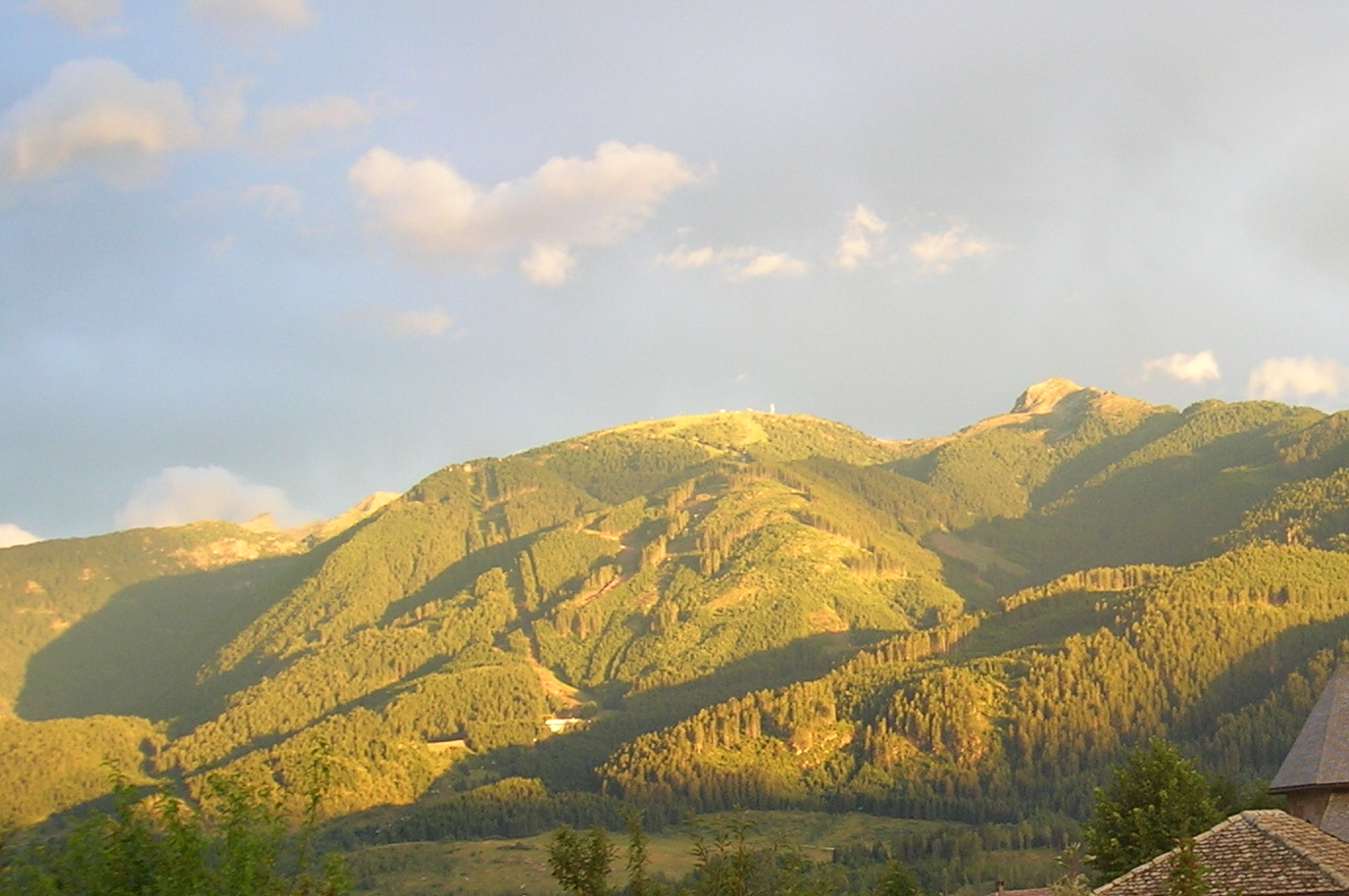
A view of Cermis mountain.

Cermis (Alpe Cermis in italian) is a mountain of the Lagorai group in eastern Trentino, Italy in the comune of Cavalese.

Part of the Val di Fiemme-Obereggen, it is famous for its ski slopes.

It was the scene of major disasters involving the aerial tramway style cable car system on the mountain: the Cavalese cable car disaster in 1976, and the Cavalese cable car massacre in 1998; the latter occurred when a U.S. military plane, while flying too low against regulations, cut a cable supporting a gondola of an aerial tramway, killing 20 people. The two cable car runs of the system involved in those incidents have since been replaced by three consecutive multi-cabin gondola lifts. The arrival site of the first chair lift, from where the second starts, may be also reached by road.

== Sports ==
=== Tour de Ski ===
The Alpe Cermis is climbed annually as the final stage in the Tour de Ski. The Final Climb stage up the alpine skiing course has been the final stage every year since the first Tour de Ski in 2006–07. The stage held as a mass start in 2020.

=== Final Climb stage winners ===
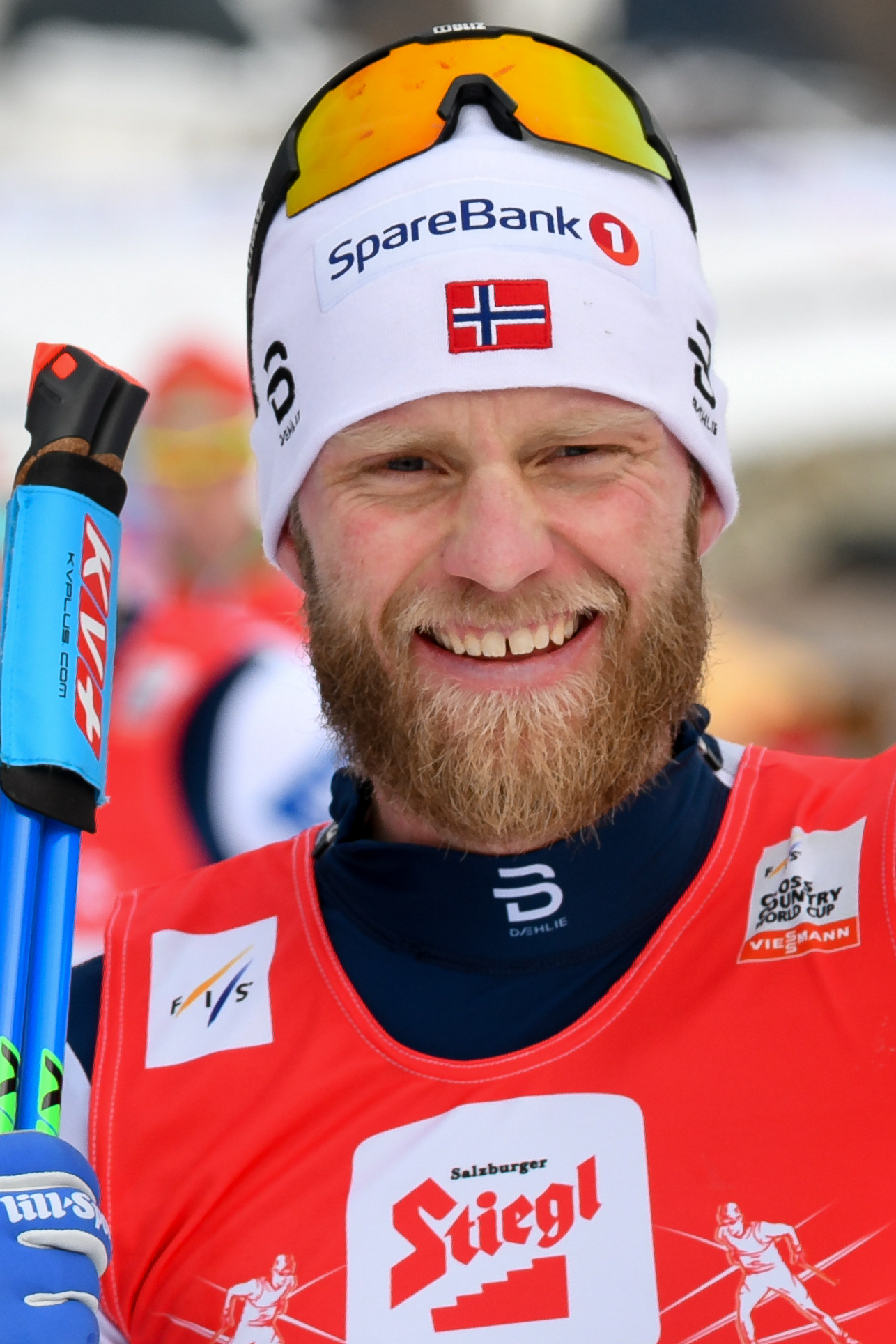
Martin Johnsrud Sundby won the Final Climb stage in 2016 and 2018.

Men
Year	Name	Nation	Time
2007	Sergey Shiryayev	Russia	32:07.8
2008	René Sommerfeldt	Germany	32:59.0
2009	Ivan Babikov	Canada	33:51.2
2010	Lukáš Bauer	Czech Republic	33:43.4
2011	Lukáš Bauer	Czech Republic	30:28.3
2012	Alexander Legkov	Russia	30:38.2
2013	Marcus Hellner	Sweden	29:59.6
2014	Chris André Jespersen	Norway	31:58.8
2015	Roland Clara	Italy	29:13.0
2016	Martin Johnsrud Sundby	Norway	30:47.0
2017	Maurice Manificat	France	29:20.0
2018	Martin Johnsrud Sundby	Norway	28:36.4
2019	Sjur Røthe	Norway	30:32.0
2020	Simen Hegstad Krüger	Norway	30:55.8
2021	Denis Spitsov	Russia	32:41.0
2022	Sjur Røthe	Norway	31:42.1
2023	Simen Hegstad Krüger	Norway	31:20.4
2024	Jules Lapierre	France	33:00.7
2025	Simen Hegstad Krüger	Norway	32:39.6

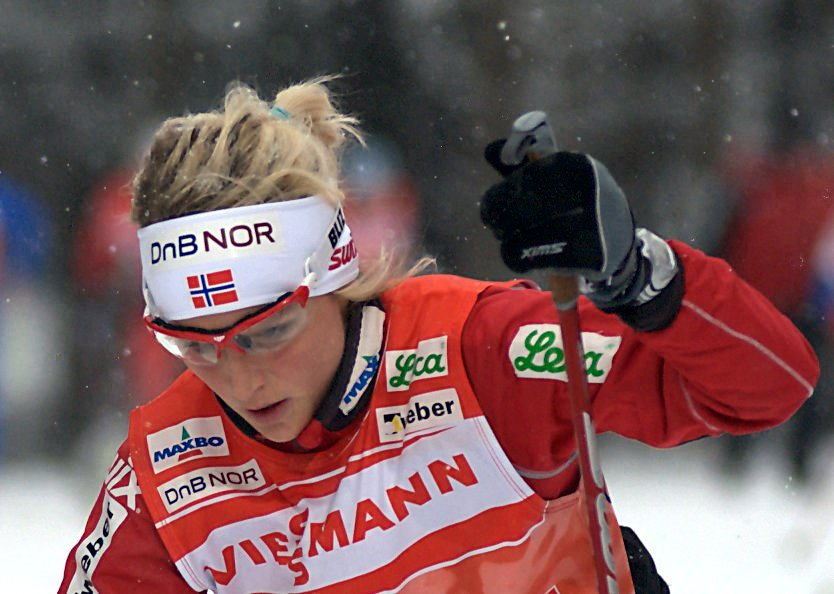
In 2020, Therese Johaug won the stage up the Alpe Cermis for the eighth time.

Ladies
Year	Name	Nation	Time
2007	Kateřina Neumannová	Czech Republic	34:24.5
2008	Valentina Shevchenko	Ukraine	34:06.2
2009	Therese Johaug	Norway	35:07.7
2010	Kristin Størmer Steira	Norway	35:49.8
2011	Therese Johaug	Norway	33:14.4
2012	Therese Johaug	Norway	34:17.7
2013	Therese Johaug	Norway	34:12.4
2014	Therese Johaug	Norway	34:19.8
2015	Therese Johaug	Norway	32:16.4
2016	Therese Johaug	Norway	33:14.8
2017	Heidi Weng	Norway	33:34.3
2018	Heidi Weng	Norway	32:11.5
2019	Ingvild Flugstad Østberg	Norway	35:15.0
2020	Therese Johaug	Norway	34:21.6
2021	Ebba Andersson	Sweden	36:45.6
2022	Heidi Weng	Norway	35:41.2
2023	Delphine Claudel	France	36:35.4
2024	Sophia Laukli	(United States) USA	38:16.5
2025	Therese Johaug	Norway	35:59.0
