= Cavalese =

Cavalese Cavalés
- Comune
- Comune di Cavalese
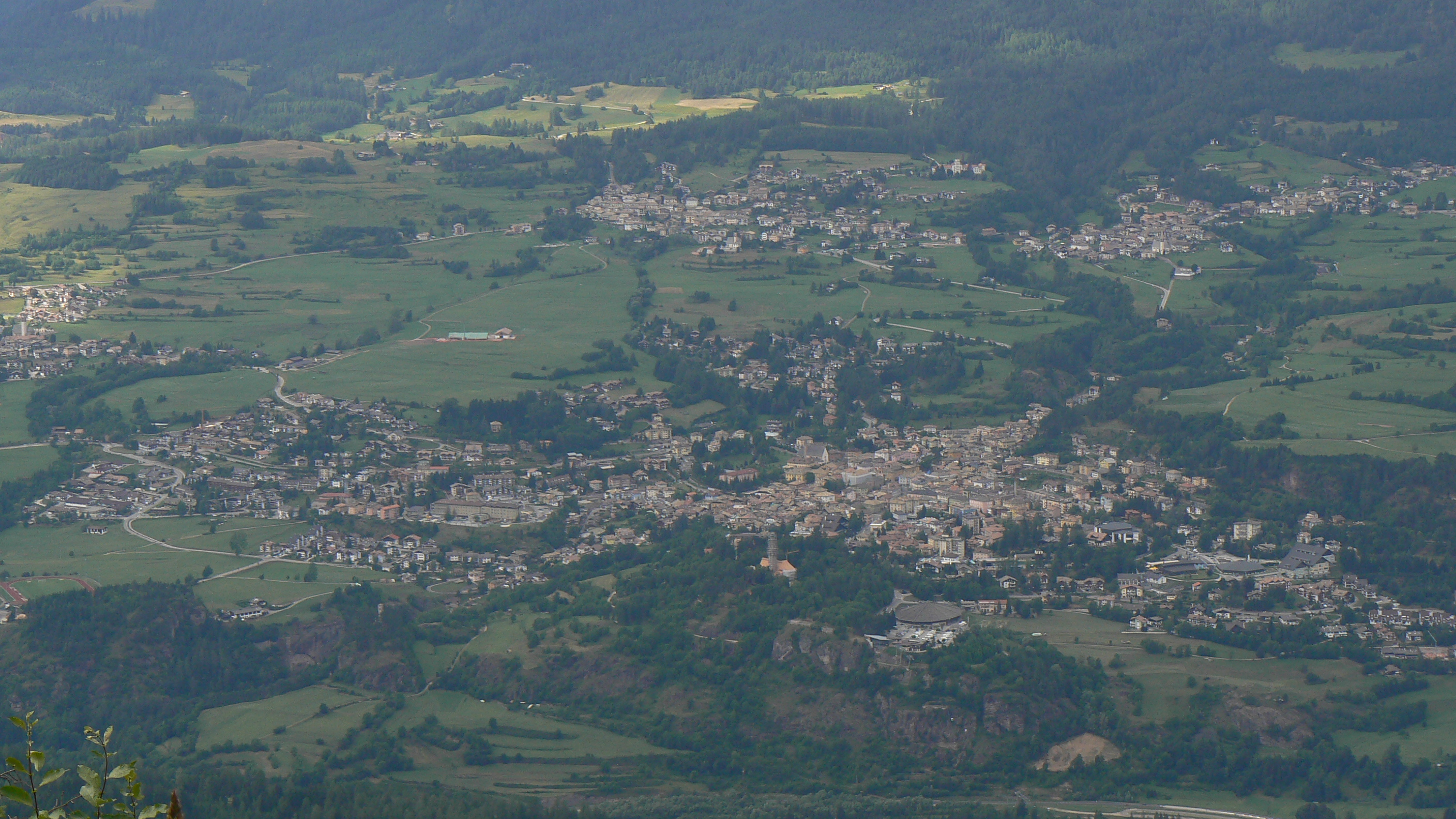
- Cavalese seen from Cermis in August 2006

- Flag Coat of arms

- Location within Italy Location within Trentino-Alto Adige/Südtirol
- Coordinates: 46°17′28″N 11°27′38″E
- Country: Italy
- Region: Trentino-Alto Adige/Südtirol
- Province: Trentino (TN)
- Frazioni: Cascata, Cavazzal, Marco, Masi di Cavalese, Milon

Government
  - Mayor: Carlo Betta

Area
  - Total: 45 km^{2} (17 sq mi)
- Elevation: 1,000 m (3,300 ft)

Population (2026)
  - Total: 4,026
  - Density: 89/km^{2} (230/sq mi)
- Demonym: Cavalesani
- Time zone: UTC+1 (CET)
  - Summer (DST): UTC+2 (CEST)
- Postal code: 38033
- Dialing code: 0462
- Patron saint: St. Sebastian
- Saint day: 20 January
- Website: Official website

Cavalese (Cavalés in local dialect, Gablöss in local german dialect) is a comune of 4,004 inhabitants in Trentino, northern Italy, a ski resort and the main center in the Fiemme Valley. It is part of the Magnifica Comunità di Fiemme (Magnificent Community of Fiemme) and, together with Predazzo, is the administrative, cultural and historical center of the valley. The town is a renowned tourist location, during winter for cross-country and alpine skiing, and during summer for excursions. The cable car from Cavalese to the nearby mountain Cermis has been the site of two major cable-car accidents, one in 1976 and one in 1998.

== History ==
The origins of Cavalese can be dated back to the Bronze Age, with the creation of a small settlement. The proper village developed during the 12th century, with the creation of mills, sawmills and blacksmiths for copper manufacturing along the Gambis brook. By that time, the Fiemme Valley was ruled by prince bishop of Trento, which allowed a broad autonomy to the local community (from here the name, Magnifica Comunità di Fiemme). During the 16th and 17th centuries Cavalese became the vacation resort of bishops and aristocrats from the region, who greatly contributed to the development of the village. The palace of the bishops eventually became the abode of the Magnificent Community during the 19th century.

During the 1900s, and especially in the years following the end of World War II, the town underwent an impressive growth thanks to the development of the construction industry, craftsmanship and tourism, with the creation of numerous hotels and more accessible ways of communication.

The cable car from Cavalese to the nearby mountain Cermis has been the site of two major cable-car accidents, one in 1976 and one in 1998 (due to a U.S. Marine Corps Northrop Grumman EA-6B Prowler aircraft cutting the cable during a training exercise, killing 20 people). In both cases the car, descending from Cermis, fell to the ground.

== Demography ==
Cavalese is undergoing a steady demographic evolution: from the 2,801 inhabitants of 1921, it has recently passed the threshold of 4,000 inhabitants.

== Economy ==
A prominent role in the economic activity is occupied by the touristic sector, with the presence of numerous hotels, restaurants, and ski resorts. Of notable importance are the construction industry, craftsmanship (wood, iron and marble) and the social cheese factory.

== Notable people ==
- Narciso Bronzetti (1821–1859), Italian patriot who fought in the second war of independence with his brother Pilade.
- Giovanni Antonio Scopoli (1723–1788), physician and naturalist
- Michelangelo Unterperger (1695–1785), Baroque painter
- Ignaz Unterberger (1748–1797), artist
- Benedetto Riccabona de Reinchenfels (1807–1879) Austrian prince bishop of Trento

== Climate ==
Climate data for Cavalese, elevation 1,041 m (3,415 ft), (1971–2000)
Month	Jan	Feb	Mar	Apr	May	Jun	Jul	Aug	Sep	Oct	Nov	Dec	Year
Mean daily maximum °C (°F)	4.0 (39.2)	5.8 (42.4)	9.1 (48.4)	13.1 (55.6)	17.6 (63.7)	21.3 (70.3)	24.0 (75.2)	23.4 (74.1)	20.4 (68.7)	15.3 (59.5)	8.5 (47.3)	4.8 (40.6)	13.9 (57.1)
Daily mean °C (°F)	−0.1 (31.8)	1.0 (33.8)	4.0 (39.2)	7.2 (45.0)	11.8 (53.2)	15.0 (59.0)	17.6 (63.7)	17.5 (63.5)	13.9 (57.0)	9.1 (48.4)	3.6 (38.5)	0.4 (32.7)	8.4 (47.2)
Mean daily minimum °C (°F)	−5.4 (22.3)	−4.8 (23.4)	−2.2 (28.0)	1.0 (33.8)	5.3 (41.5)	8.3 (46.9)	10.7 (51.3)	10.4 (50.7)	7.2 (45.0)	3.1 (37.6)	−1.8 (28.8)	−4.6 (23.7)	2.3 (36.1)
Average precipitation mm (inches)	33 (1.3)	33 (1.3)	45 (1.8)	61 (2.4)	96 (3.8)	101 (4.0)	100 (3.9)	90 (3.5)	70 (2.8)	61 (2.4)	59 (2.3)	33 (1.3)	782 (30.8)
Source: Istituto Superiore per la Protezione e la Ricerca Ambientale

== Photogallery ==
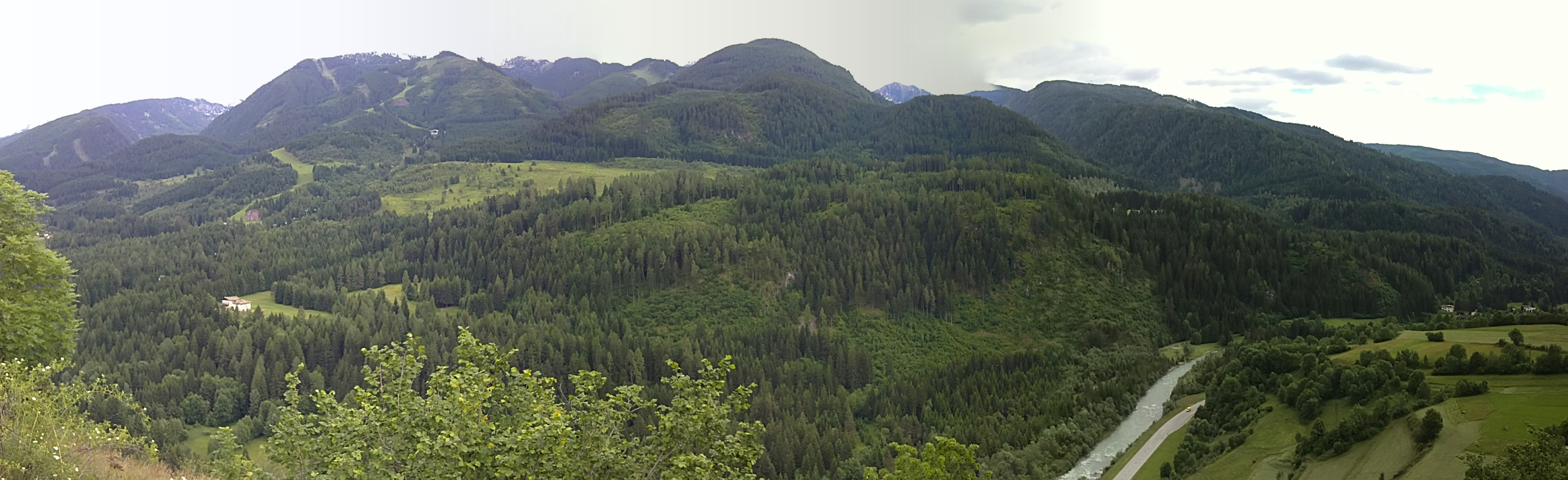
Panorama from Parco della Pieve

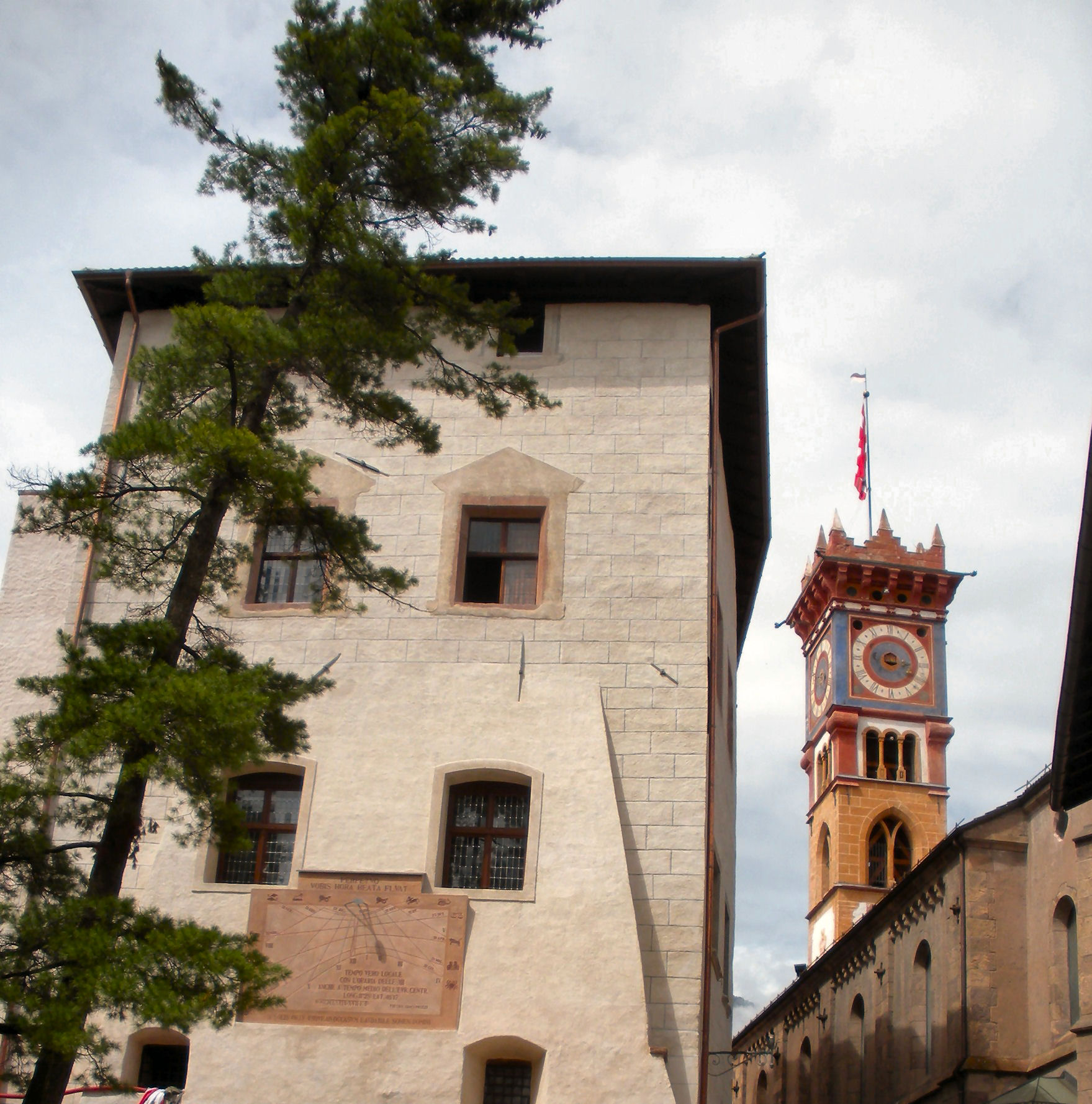
the civic tower

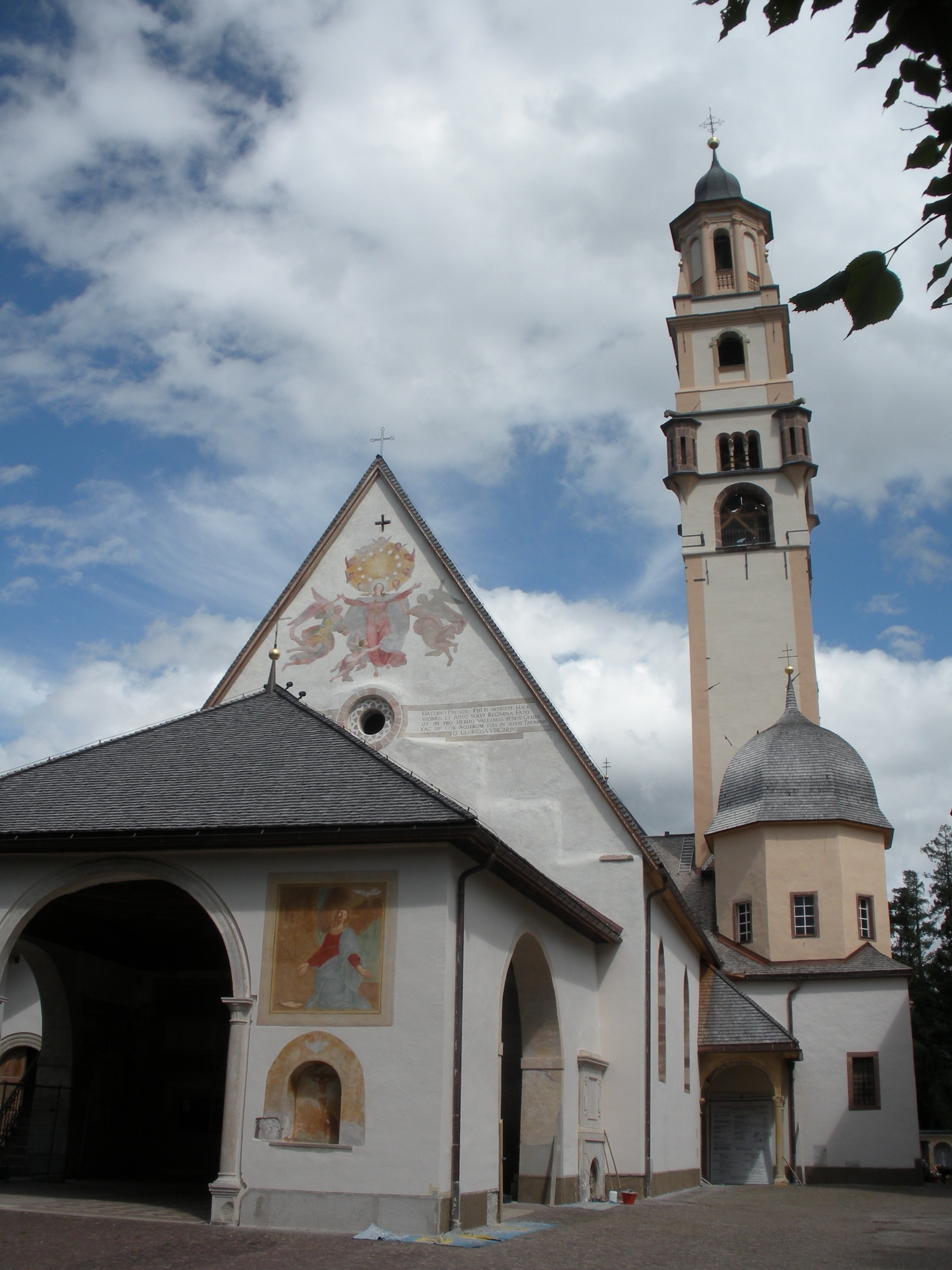
Santa Maria Assunta Parish church

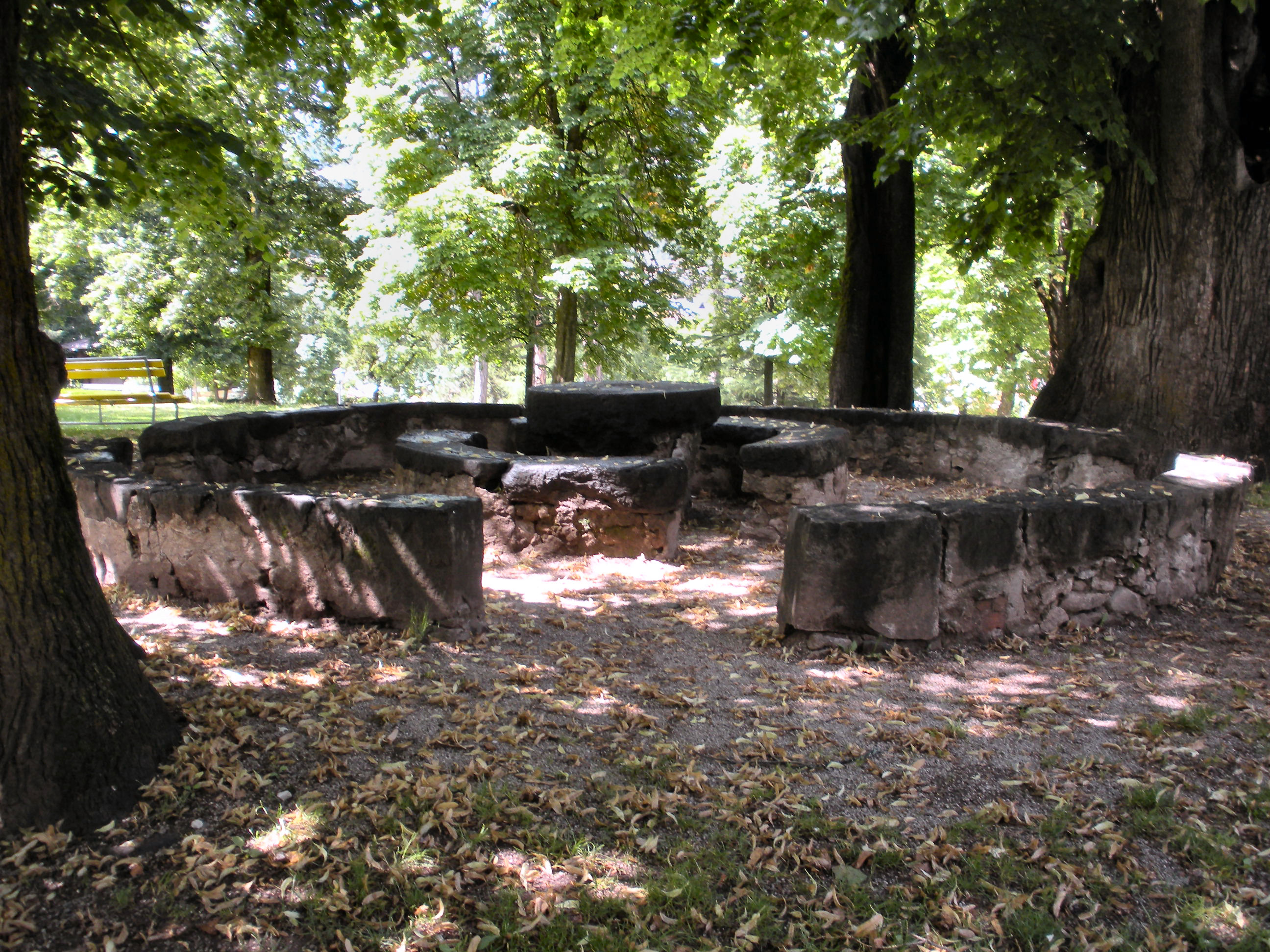
the "Banco della Reson"

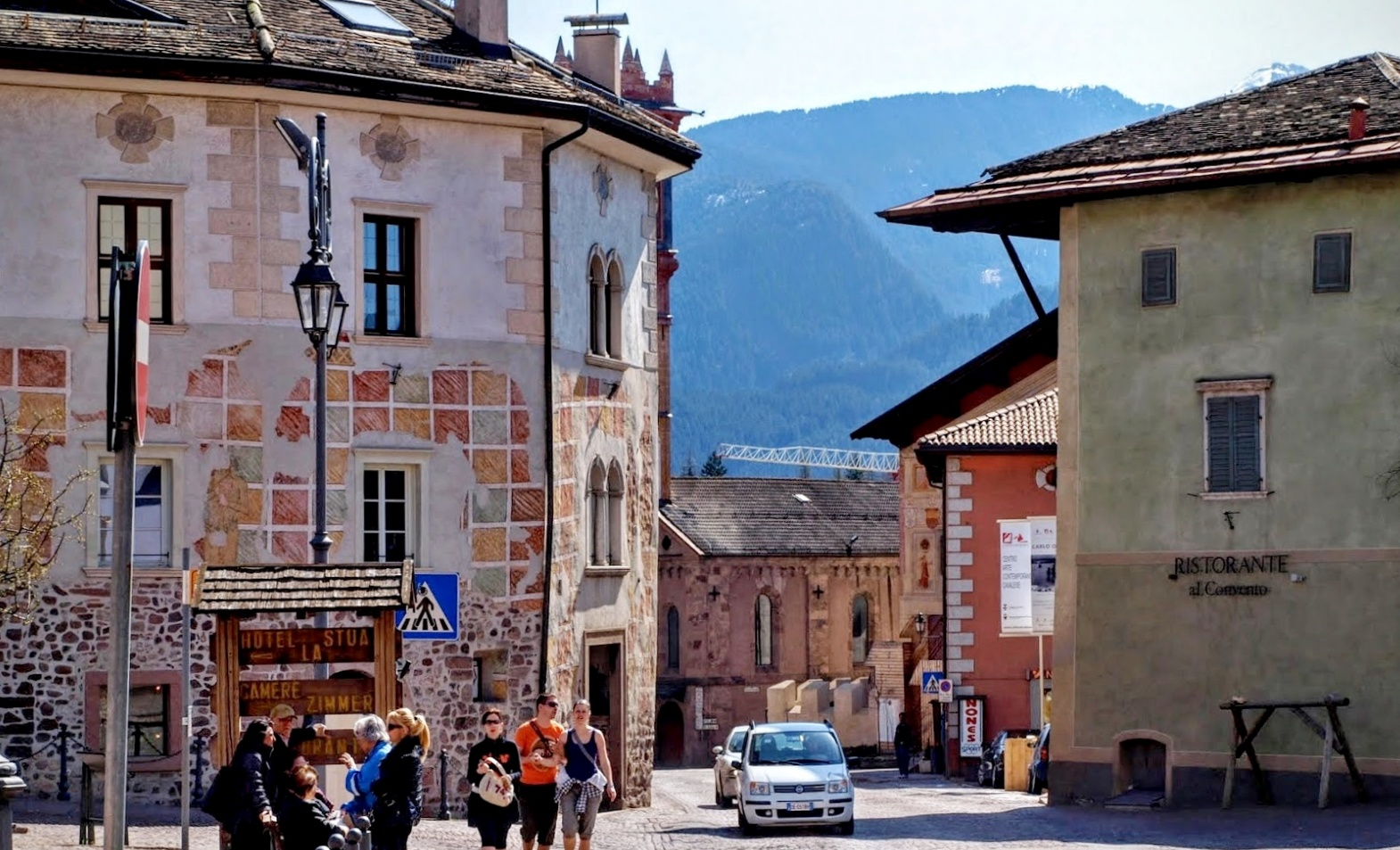
Piazza dei Francescani

== See also ==
- 1976 Cavalese cable car crash
- 1998 Cavalese cable car crash
- Cermis
