= 1977 Yokohama F-4 crash =

1977 military aviation accident

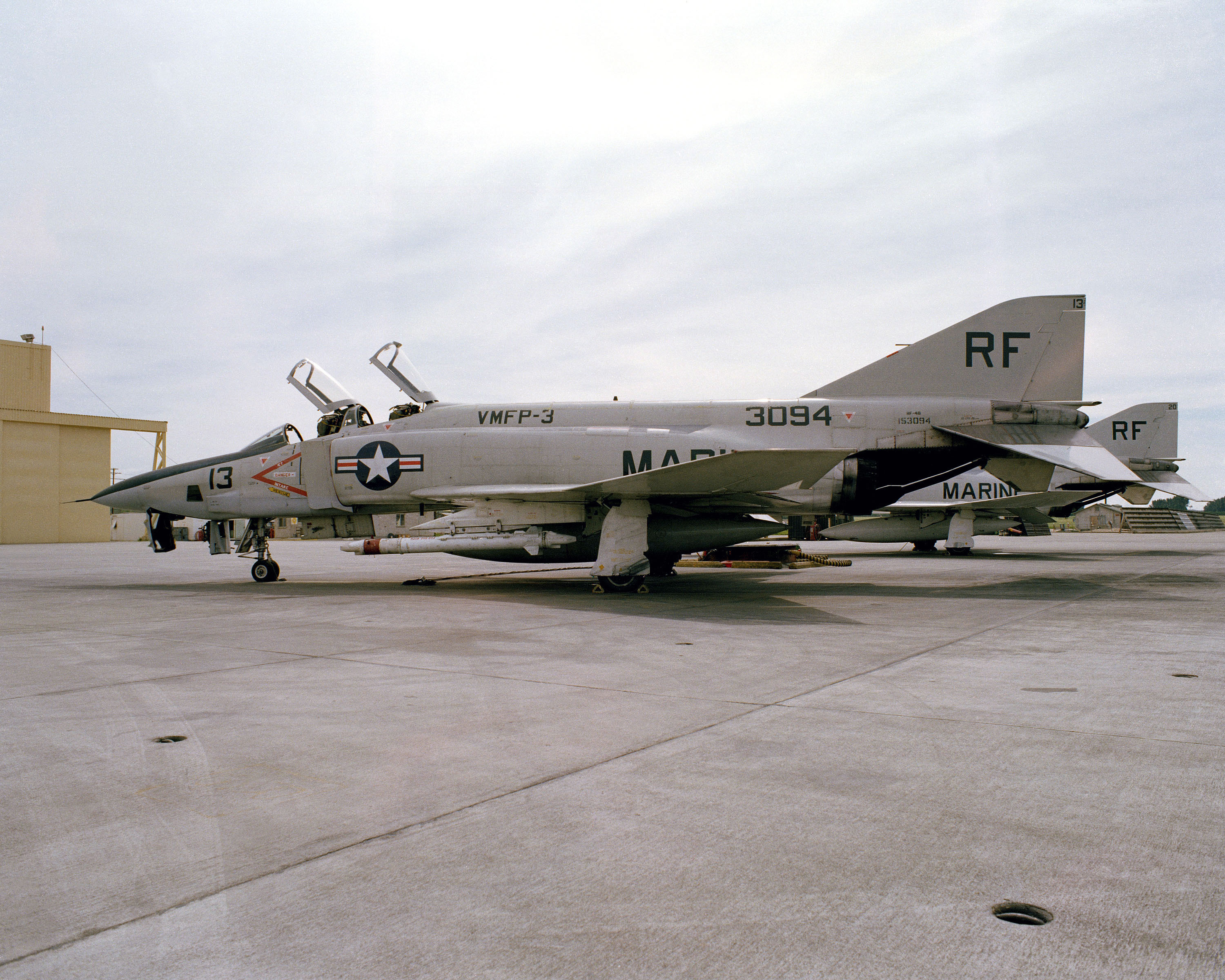
- An RF-4B Phantom II similar to the accident aircraft

Accident
- Date: September 27, 1977
- Summary: Mechanical failure leading to in-flight fire
- Site: Yokohama, Japan; 35°33′36″N 139°32′42″E
- Total fatalities: 3 (on ground; includes one death five years later from injuries related to the crash)
- Total injuries: 6 (on ground)

Aircraft
- Aircraft type: McDonnell Douglas RF-4B Phantom II
- Operator: United States Navy / United States Marine Corps
- Registration: 157344
- Flight origin: Naval Air Facility Atsugi
- Passengers: 0
- Crew: 2
- Fatalities: 0
- Injuries: 0
- Survivors: 2 (all)

Ground casualties
- Ground fatalities: 3
- Ground injuries: 6

The 1977 Yokohama F-4 crash (横浜米軍機墜落事件, Yokohama Beigunki Tsuiraku Jiken; lit. "Yokohama American Military Aircraft Crash Incident") occurred on 27 September 1977, in Yokohama, Japan. In the crash, a United States Marine Corps (USMC) McDonnell Douglas RF-4B-41-MC, BuNo 157344, c/n 3717, 'RF611' (a reconnaissance variant of the F-4) of VMFP-3 flown by a USMC crew based at nearby Naval Air Facility Atsugi, en route to USS Midway in Sagami Bay, suffered a mechanical malfunction, the port engine caught fire, and crashed into a residential neighborhood. The crash killed two boys, ages 1 and 3, and injured seven others, several seriously. The two-man crew of the aircraft, Capt. J. E. Miller, of Mendota, Illinois, and 1st Lt. D. R. Durbin, of Natchitoches, Louisiana, ejected and were not seriously injured.

The crash, which occurred near present-day Eda Station, destroyed several houses. The two young boys initially survived the crash into their home, but died later from severe burns. The boys' mother, Kazue Doshida, was also severely burned. Due to the fear that she would be adversely affected during her recovery by the shock, she was not told until 29 January 1979, that her sons had died. Upon hearing of their deaths, Doshida responded that she wanted to hold them one more time. Doshida died in 1982, aged 31, from complications related to her injuries.

== Memorial ==
In memorial to Doshida, a statue was erected in 1985 in a Yokohama park. The statue depicts her holding her two sons.

== Anime ==
Toei Animation Studios produced an animation story of the F-4 crash titled "Papa Mama Bye-Bye" in 1984. It was directed by Hiroshi Shitara with the story written by Katsumoto Saotome. The anime covered the life of the two young victims of the crash from the early summer of 1977 to their deaths on the night of 27 September 1977.

== See also ==
- Aviation accidents in Japan involving U.S. military and government aircraft post-World War II
- 1959 Okinawa F-100 crash
- 1960 Munich C-131 crash
- 1964 Machida F-8 crash
- 1988 Remscheid A-10 crash
- Cavalese cable car disaster (1998)
