= 52 pickup =

Practical joke

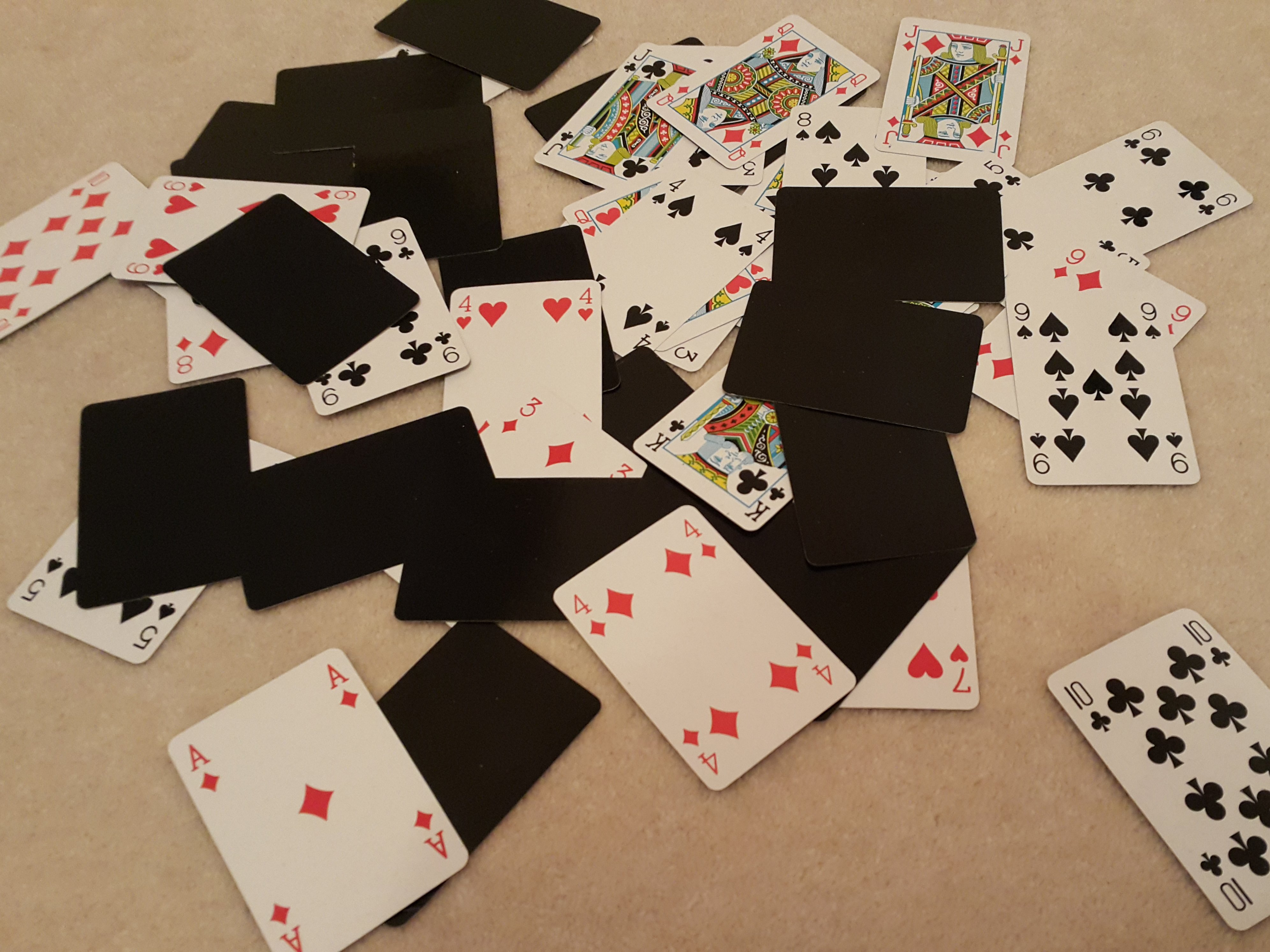
Playing cards scattered on the floor

52 pickup or 52-card pickup is a card game which consists entirely of picking up a scattered deck of playing cards. It is typically played as a practical joke, where the "dealer" invites unfamiliar players to play a game of "52 pickup" (implying it is a legitimate card game), only to throw all the cards into the air so they land strewn on the floor, and instructs other players to pick them up.

The Encyclopedia of American Folklore (2007) describes it as a "popular American prank", noting that it works best on younger children who are eager to be involved in play and less likely to ask questions prior to the game. The game is also popular in Germany as 32 heb auf.

== Rules ==
The game requires at least one player who is familiar with the game (the prankster) and one player who wants to be initiated into the game. The prankster presents a deck of cards, and "unnecessary" cards such as jokers may be removed to give the impression that a legitimate game will be played. The prankster, as "dealer", then throws the entire deck into the air so the cards land strewn on the floor. The other player must then pick them up, usually needing them gathered into a deck with all the cards facing the same direction.

== Variations ==
One variant has the "dealer" hold up the deck of cards in one hand in a grip similar to the grip one might use to shuffle the cards. The deck is usually pre-arranged to have a few black cards on the bottom. The "dealer" instructs the other player(s) to call out "smoke" if they see a black card, and "fire" if they see a red. They hold up the deck and take the cards one by one off the bottom as the other player(s) call out "smoke" ... "smoke" ... "smoke" ... and, with the first red card, "fire!" On hearing "fire", the "dealer" riffles the cards (as if to shuffle them) into the air, "firing" the entire deck of cards toward the other player(s).

The prank is sometimes renamed to adjust for deck sizes other than 52 or to fool someone who is already familiar with the game under its normal name.

Another version of the prank can be played where one player declares "52-card pick up" and is then granted power to throw each of the 52 cards individually at any of the opponents.

== As a game ==
By introducing additional rules, the task of picking up the cards can be made into a solitaire game. A popular rule of this kind is that only cards from the top of the heap may be removed, and that they must be removed in sets that form poker combinations.

Similarly, a competitive element can be introduced, e.g., when one player must pick up the cards in red suits and another those in black suits. If the cards are substituted with more robust and easily distinguishable objects such as plastic spoons in various colors, the game becomes appropriate for a group of very young children to train locomotive, object control, and recognition skills. Letter or word cards can be used for older children.

A similar game is called "card rugby" (a cross between 52 pickup and rugby) which involves two teams of people. The dealer has a pack of cards, they then show the teams a card in the pack, e.g., two of spades. The dealer then shuffles the cards and they are thrown into the air. The two teams then must find the card mentioned and the first team to find the card and run to the other end of the room with it and touch down wins.

== History ==
While written records start later, the prank appears to have been played among children as early as 1942. The Encyclopedia of American Folklore discusses it under "folk humor" and, confirmed by numerous references in popular cultures, describes it as a "popular American prank". It notes that the typical mark for the prank is a very young child who is too keen to be included in play to ask questions. The game is also popular in Germany, where it is known as 32 heb auf and is played with a Skat deck of 32 cards. At least one American card game anthology has listed the prank among more formal children's games.
