= 1976 Cavalese cable car crash =

1976 deadly cable car crash in Cavalese, Italy

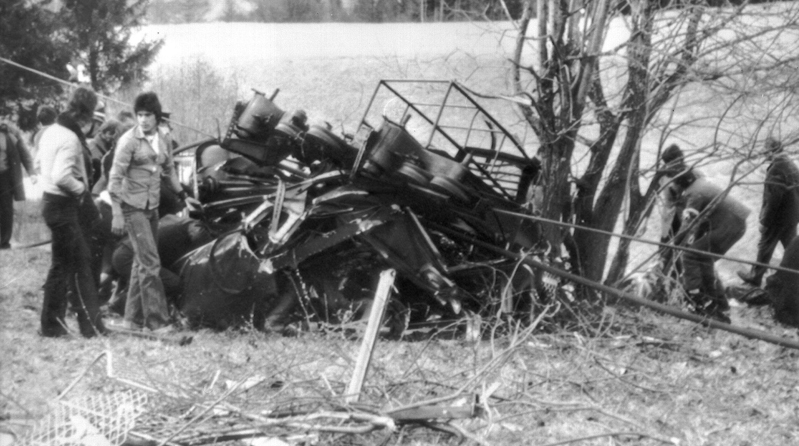
- The cabin after the incident
- Date: 9 March 1976
- Time: 17:19, local time
- Location: Cavalese, Trentino, Italy; 46°16′46.5″N 11°28′09.7″E
- Cause: Overlap of cables, human error
- Deaths: 42
- Injuries: 1

The Cavalese cable car crash is the deadliest cable car crash in history. On 9 March 1976, the steel supporting cable broke as a fully loaded cable car was descending from Mt. Cermis, near the Italian ski resort of Cavalese in the Dolomites, 40 km (25 mi) north-east of Trento. The cause of the disaster was an overlap of the carrier cable with the support cable near the first pylon, which resulted in the carrier shearing the support cable.

== Accident ==
The cabin fell some 70 metres (230 ft) down a mountainside, It was then dragged by the carrier cable for another 100–200 metres before coming to a halt in a grassy meadow. In the fall, the three-ton overhead carriage assembly fell on top of the car, crushing it. The crushing was possibly exacerbated by the dragging along the ground. The cause of death of a large fraction of victims was due to suffocation rather than due to injuries suffered as a direct result of the fall. Forty-two people died, including 15 children between the ages of 7 and 15 and the 18-year-old cable car attendant. Initial reports stated 41 dead with one missing; however, the last body, that of Fabio Rustia, was found later. His body was sent to Milan by mistake when it was misidentified. The only survivor was a 14-year-old Milanese girl, Alessandra Piovesana, who was on a school trip and was with two friends when the crash happened. She testified in the succeeding trials and later worked as a journalist for the science magazine Airone, before her death from illness in 2009.

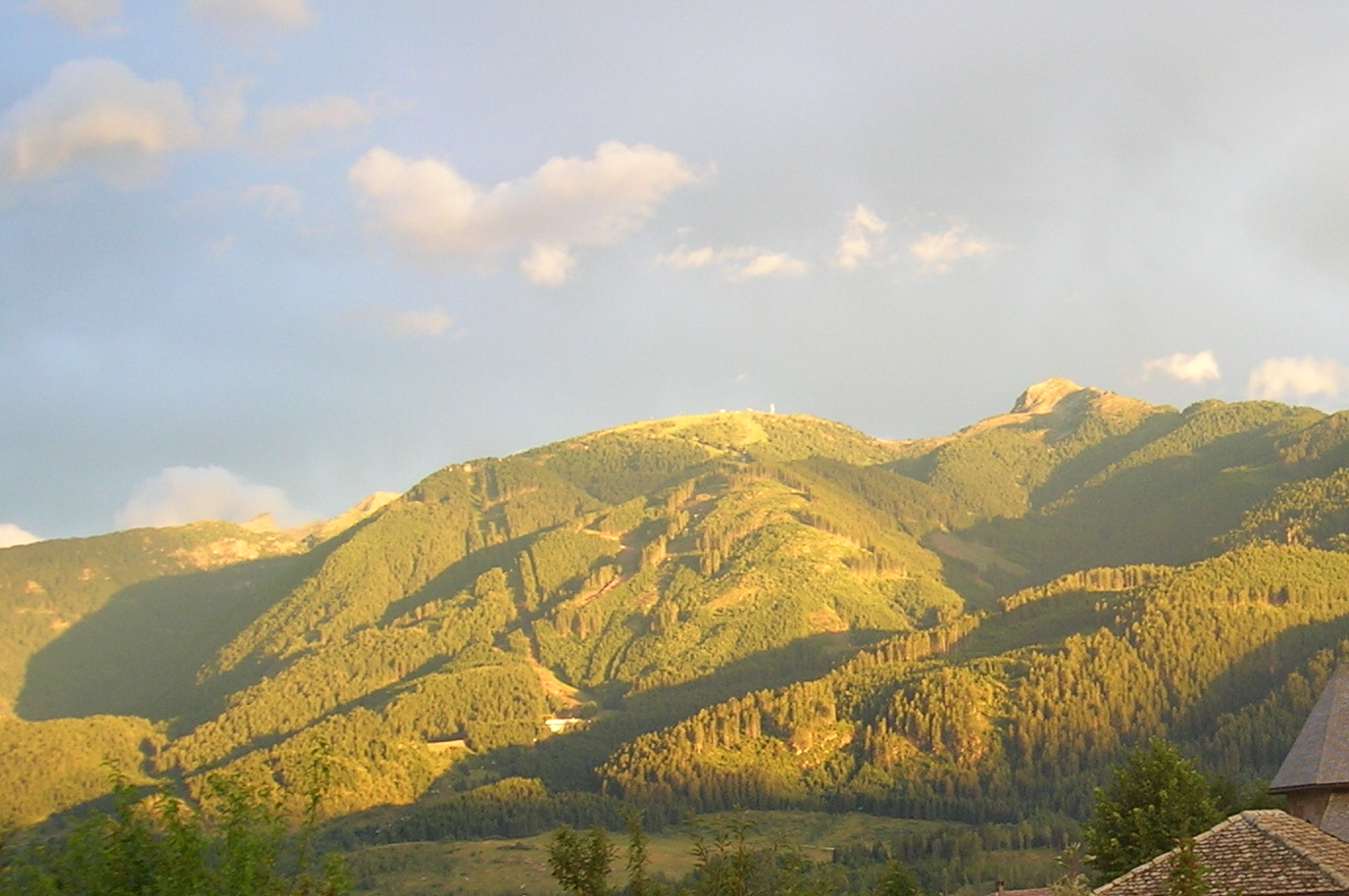
Cermis mountain near Cavalese

The cable car had a capacity of 40 people or 7,000 pounds (3,200 kg). At the time of the crash, at 5:19 pm, the cable car had 43 occupants—justified by the operator as many of them being children. Most of the victims were West Germans from Hamburg. Among those aboard were 21 West Germans, 11 Italians, 7 Austrians, and one French woman.

Alessandra Piovesana survived because she was protected by other bodies from the impact of the fall, and she was standing at the front of the cabin, which was the least impacted part due to the orientation of the overhead carriage, which crushed the cabin. She testified in courts and reported her experience of the incident: "I was going down with two of my friends, Francesca and Giovanni. We stood at the front of the cabin facing Cavalese. The ride seemed to be normal until we reached the middle pylon when the car had suddenly stopped. We stood still for maybe a minute. Then it had started again, had winced, someone in the cabin had started laughing. Someone had said "hooch" when the rocking got stronger. They all laughed as if it were a game. Then there was a loud noise, I knew immediately that something dangerous was happening. I clung to Francesca. Then the cabin jerked backwards, and I felt lifted, then pulled in the gin by the legs, I couldn't breathe. The fall, the experts say, did not last more than three or four seconds. Four seconds before it crashed. Someone saw death run towards him. Certainly, those who were near the windows saw it as the cable car cabins are very panoramic. Four seconds are a moment, but they are also an eternity. I thought I was going to die. After hitting the ground everyone seemed to stop screaming and I heard only my voice. Then I passed out, but then woke up before help arrived. I tried to talk to Francesca, but she wasn't communicating. I saw Giovanni crouched on the ground with his face in his hands and crying. A child was screaming "Mom", a voice of a man was saying: "I'm going back to Milan immediately, I'm going home". Then he silenced forever. The other was a woman's voice: "I want my son" and she too silenced. Then I tried to open the door in the roof of the cabin. Help shortly arrived and I wanted to call my mother to tell her I was OK. Next I was being taken to a hospital."

== Investigation ==
The inquest found that the stationary and the moving steel cables crossed, with one severing the other. A contributing factor that caused the crossing of cables was likely an increased speed of the cabin when going over a pylon (possibly over 10 m/s). In an attempt to reduce the journey time from 6 and a half to 5 and a half minutes and combat the long queues of skiers waiting for the lift, many regulations given by the cable car manufacturer were broken, including manual alterations to a programme that regulates the speed of cabins near pylons. Some reports state that the "slow down regions around the pylon" were halved while several skiers who took the cable car in the few days before the crash reported to the police that the cabins did not slow down at all near the middle pylon. However, a crossing, or an overlap, of cables on this type of cable car is not an unexpected situation and there is a safety system that stops the cabin immediately if the two cables touch. The safety system was triggered on this occasion, and the cabin with 43 people on board halted suddenly shortly after passing the pylon, swinging abruptly according to several witnesses. The operator of the cable car, Carlo Schweizer, was a seasonal worker who was not licensed to operate such cabins. The cable car companies had cut costs by replacing licensed workers with cheaper unlicensed ones or did not allow them to take a test to obtain a license so they did not have to increase their salaries (Carlo Schweizer took the test 1 month after the disaster and failed). When the cabin halted abruptly as a result of engagement of the safety system, the operator did not know what to do as he was not trained for this situation. After a telephone conversation, the operator was instructed by his colleague, Aldo Gianmoena, to disable the automatic stop safety system that had engaged due to the cables crossing. This manoeuvre was apparently done repeatedly on this particular cable car as cables often briefly touched each other on a long stretch between the station and the pylon, possibly as a result of the excessive speeds of the cabins. (Note. There is a key used to disable this safety system. It is normally locked and sealed and should not be touched with passengers on board the cabins. The investigation found this key not only freely accessible to all operators, but it showed signs of significant wear as a result of its frequent use.) This time, however, the cables did not simply touch, but overlapped each other. Disabling the safety stop system caused the engine to keep on pulling the cabin even though the cables were crossed. The pull of the heavily loaded cabin exerted excessive force on the support cable at the point where the cables overlapped. The overlap was noticed by Giorgio Demattio, an operator who was travelling alone in the second cabin in the other direction, parallel to the stretch where the overlap occurred. He reported that intense sparks were visible from a distance and noise was heard. He tried to report this occurrence by phone that is part of the communication between the cabin and the middle station, but the phone did not work. Approximately 80–90 seconds after the cabin was restarted without the safety system, the support cable gave way. The full cabin with 43 people on board hit the ground while the other cabin with the single operator became stranded mid-air between the pylon and the middle station (Dos Dei Laresi). The operator in this stranded cabin had to climb to the ground with the help of an emergency ladder. There was a delay in between the fall of the cabin and the pulling engine being stopped, which led to the dragging of the cabin along the ground for 100–200 metres. This delay was likely caused by the confusion of the inexperienced operator, Carlo Schweizer, who reported that he had to hide under the operational unit as the top part of the snapped cable sprang backwards due to tension, hitting the control room and breaking windows.

The trials were lengthy as the lift officials denied the phone call between Carlo Schweizer and Aldo Gianmoena. Four lift officials were jailed for their part in the disaster.

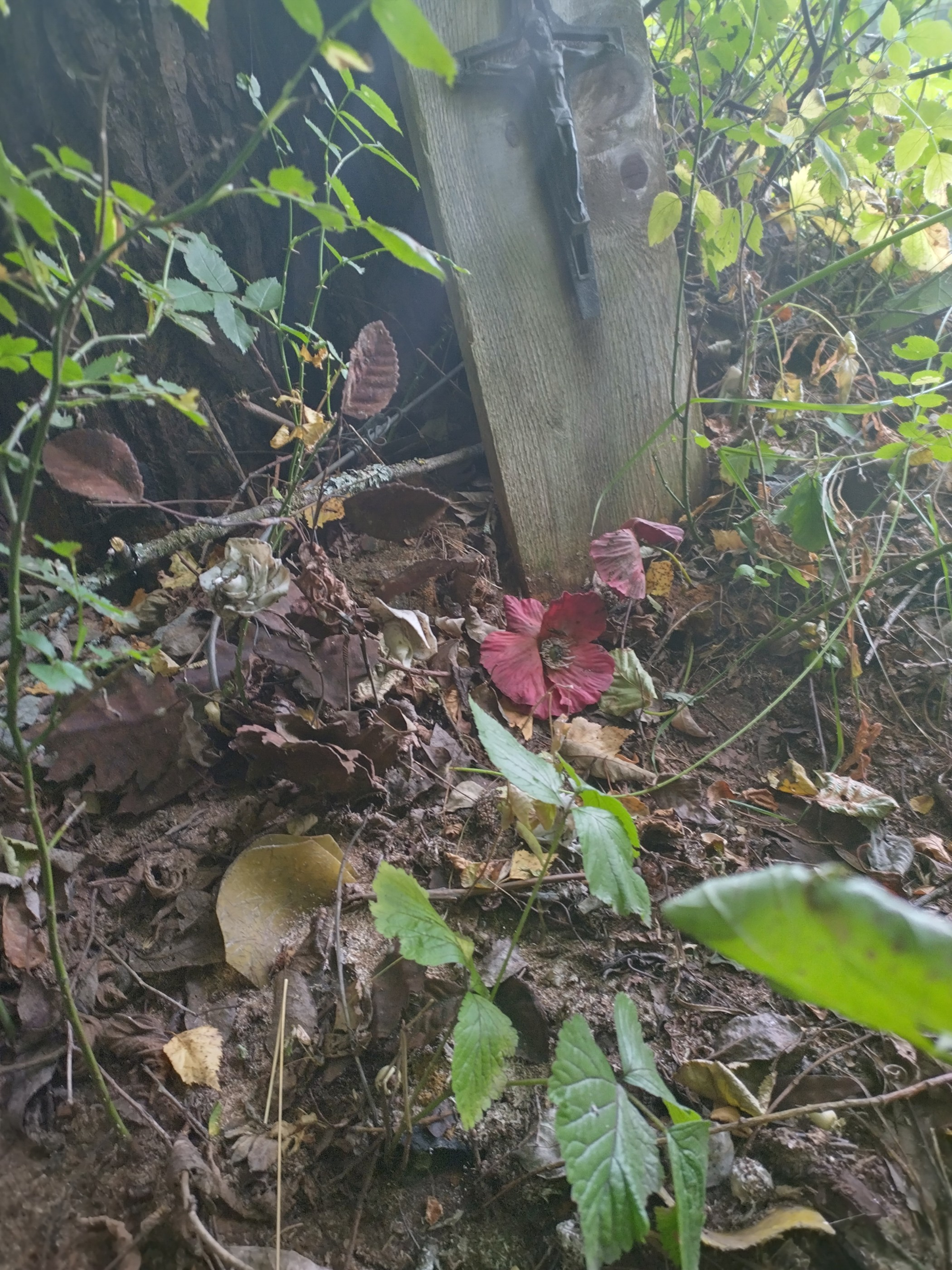
Memorial to the victims of the accident located on the valley floor where the crashed cabin stopped

== See also ==
- Cable car accidents and disasters by death toll
