= 1964 Machida F-8 crash =

1964 military aviation accident

Coordinates: 35°33′N 139°26′E

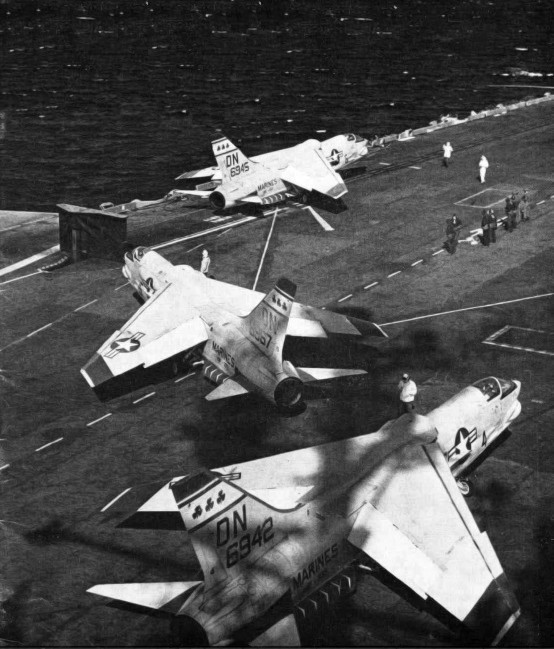
- Three U.S. Marine Corps Vought F8U-2 (F-8C) Crusaders on the U.S. aircraft carrier USS Forrestal (CVA-59), ca. 1960.

Accident
- Date: April 5, 1964
- Summary: Mechanical failure
- Site: Machida, Tokyo, Japan

Aircraft
- Aircraft type: Vought RF-8A Crusader
- Operator: United States Marine Corps
- Registration: 146891
- Flight origin: Kadena Air Base, Okinawa
- Destination: Naval Air Facility Atsugi, Kanagawa Prefecture
- Passengers: 0
- Crew: 1 (survived)
- Fatalities: 4 (on ground)
- Injuries: 32 (on ground)

The 1964 Machida F-8 crash (町田米軍機墜落事故, lit. "Machida American Military Aircraft Crash") occurred on 5 April 1964 in Machida, Tokyo, Japan. A United States Marine Corps Vought RF-8A Crusader, BuNo 146891, which was returning as one half of a two-plane flight of Crusaders from Kadena Air Base, Okinawa to its home base of Naval Air Facility Atsugi, Kanagawa Prefecture, suffered a mechanical malfunction. It subsequently crashed into a residential neighborhood in the Hara-Machida area of Machida City (near present-day JR Machida Station) in Tokyo, Japan. The other aircraft landed safely at Atsugi.

The crash killed four people and injured 32 others on the ground. The stricken aircraft's pilot, Captain R. L. Bown of Seattle, Washington, successfully ejected at 5,000 ft (1,500 m) and landed on a car, suffering minor bruises. The accident destroyed seven houses. Three of the four fatalities were caused by debris from the collapsed houses, and the fourth was from pieces of the destroyed aircraft.

== See also ==
- Aviation accidents in Japan involving U.S. military and government aircraft post-World War II
- 1959 Okinawa F-100 crash
- 1977 Yokohama F-4 crash
