= 1960 Munich C-131 crash =

1960 aviation disaster in Munich, West Germany

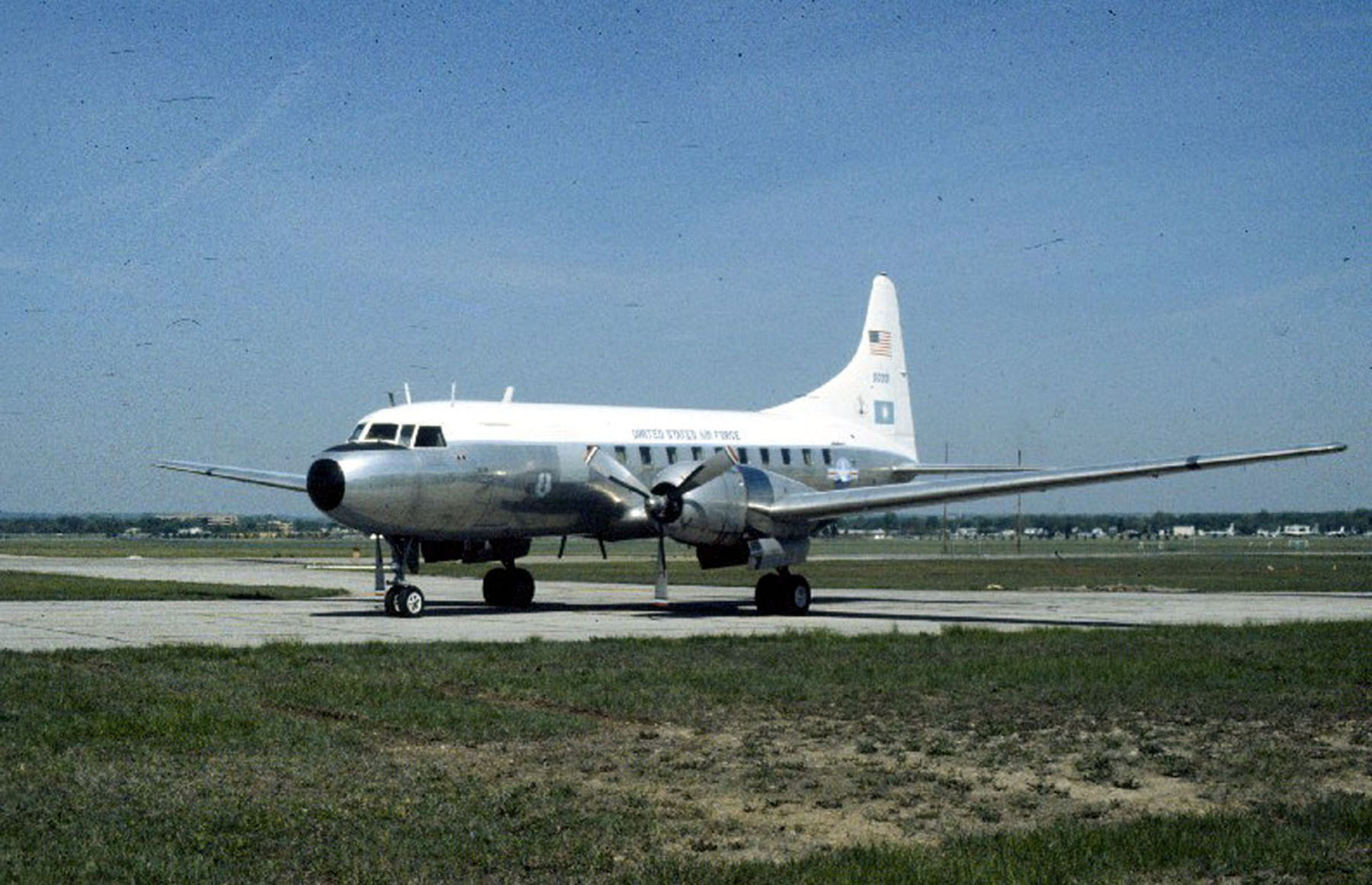
- A C-131D similar to the accident aircraft

Accident
- Date: 17 December 1960
- Summary: Take-off failure
- Site: West of Munich-Riem Airport, Munich, West Germany; 48°8′20″N 11°32′59″E
- Total fatalities: 52 (including 32 on the ground)
- Total injuries: 20 (on the ground)

Aircraft
- Aircraft type: Convair C-131D (CV-340)
- Operator: Third Air Force, United States Air Force
- Registration: 55-0291
- Flight origin: Munich-Riem Airport
- Destination: RAF Northolt
- Passengers: 13
- Crew: 7
- Fatalities: 20
- Survivors: 0

Ground casualties
- Ground fatalities: 32
- Ground injuries: 20

On 17 December 1960, a Convair C-131D Samaritan operated by the United States Air Force on a flight from Munich to RAF Northolt crashed shortly after take-off from Munich-Riem Airport, due to fuel contamination. All 20 passengers and crew on board as well as 32 people on the ground were killed.

== Accident ==
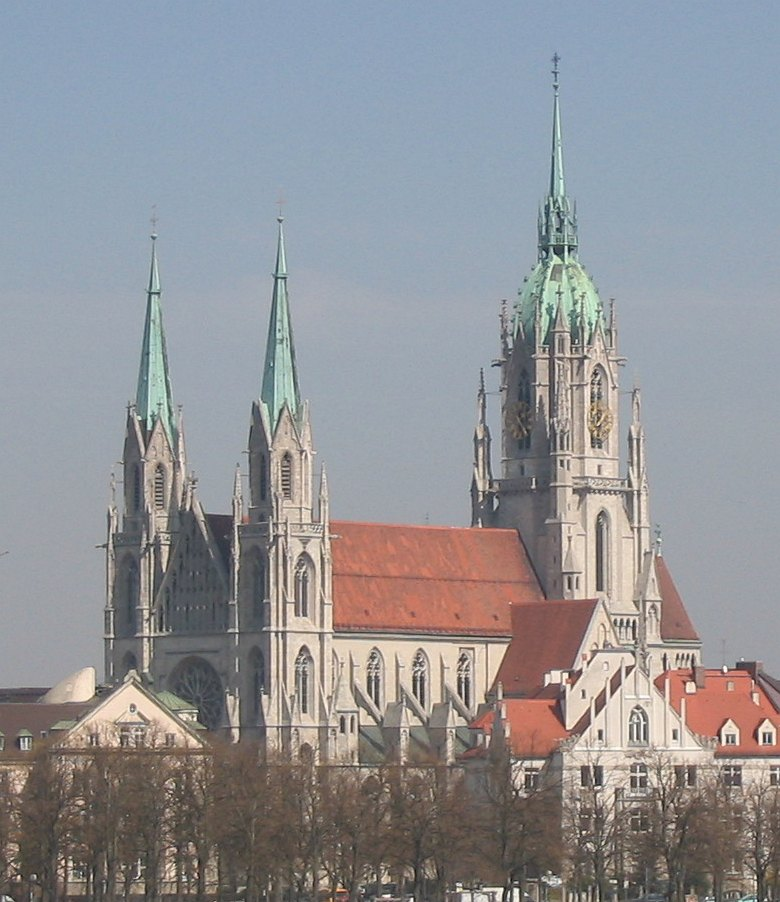
St. Paul's Church, Munich

On 17 December 1960, the Samaritan was due to fly from Munich-Riem airport in Germany to RAF Northolt in the United Kingdom with 13 passengers and 7 crew. Shortly after takeoff, the aircraft lost power to one of its two Pratt & Whitney R-2800 radial engines. Unable to maintain altitude and with bad visibility due to fog, it hit the 318-foot (97 m) steeple of St. Paul's Church next to the Oktoberfest site (then vacant) in the Ludwigsvorstadt borough. Subsequently, at 2:10 PM, it crashed into a crowded two-section Munich tramway car on Martin-Greif-Straße, close to Bayerstraße.

All 13 passengers and 7 crew members on the plane died. 32 people on the ground were killed and 20 were injured. A section of the wing crashed through the roof of a building at Hermann-Lingg-Straße, a block away from the main accident site, without injuring anybody there. The Free Lance-Star, a daily newspaper for Fredricksburg and its surrounding areas, reported that some passengers on the Convair were holiday-bound University of Maryland students who were dependents of military personnel stationed in England.

== Aircraft ==
The accident aircraft, Convair C-131D-CO Samaritan, (c/n 212, company designation: Model 340-79), was a twin piston engined military transport with seating for 44 passengers. Given the military serial number 55-0291, the aircraft was the first United States Air Force C-131 to be based in Europe, at RAF Northolt, where it was under command of the 7500th Air Base Group, 3rd Air Force, U.S. Air Forces in Europe (USAFE).

== Investigation ==
A crash investigation revealed water in the fuel tank booster pump. Because water is more dense than fuel it can settle to the bottom of the tank, into the pump inlets; when it freezes it blocks inlets and deprives the engine of fuel. This deprivation of fuel caused the Munich C-131 to lose power and eventually shut down the engine.

== Aftermath ==
After the accident, the Munich Fire & Rescue Services ordered new TLF 16 powder trucks to complement their fleet of traditional water tenders.

Munich had initiated expansion plans for Munich-Riem Airport in 1954. However, two plane crashes within the Munich city limit in the space of two years, and the New York air disaster that happened a day before, stopped the expansion plans. The city and state governments decided to build a new airport outside the city limit instead. Similar discussions were held in Hamburg about its Fuhlsbüttel Airport, but the airport was expanded rather than relocated elsewhere, making the airport the oldest continuously operated in Germany to this day.

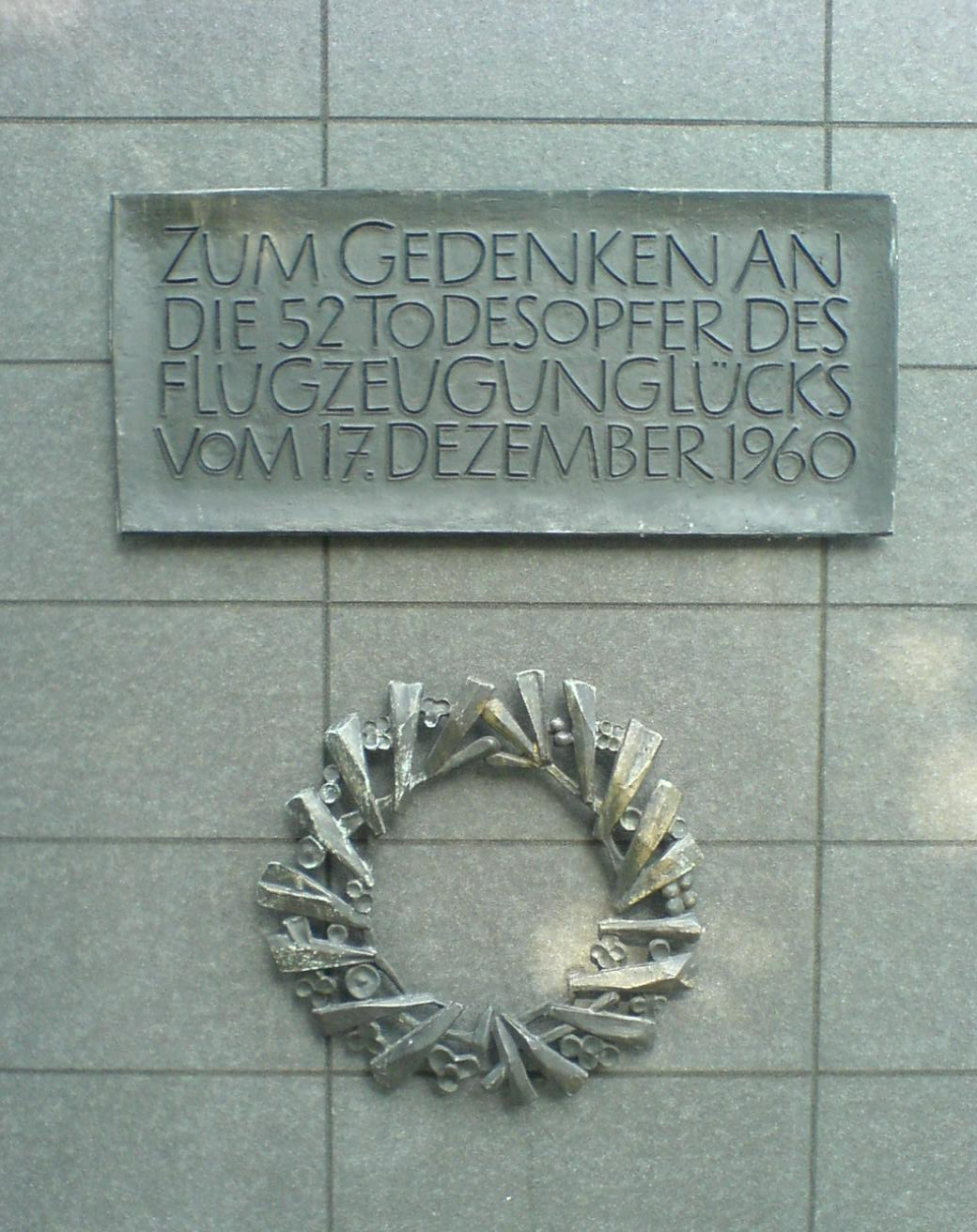
Memorial plaque at the accident site (translation: "In memory of the 52 victims of the airplane crash on 17 December 1960")

== See also ==
- List of accidents and incidents involving military aircraft

== Other sources ==
- Oberbayerisches Volksblatt / Rosenheimer Anzeiger (No. 293 – year 106), 19 December 1960 (German)
- Neue Deutsche Wochenschau 569/1960 Summary of a TV report (German). Retrieved 23 January 2019.
- Great Disasters by Editor John Canning, ISBN 0-907407-95-1 published by Octopus in 1976.
- Erinnerungen an das Drama in München. Bavarian Broadcasting Corporation: text, video and pictures (German). Retrieved 23 January 2019.
