= List of aircraft (Q) =

This is a list of aircraft in alphabetical order beginning with 'Q'.

== Q ==
=== QinetiQ ===
- QinetiQ Zephyr

=== Qingting ===
- Qingting-5
- Qingting-6

=== Quaissard ===
(Gaston Quaissard)

- Quaissard GQ.01 Monogast

=== Quander ===
(UL Flugzeugbau Quander, Petershagen, Germany)

- Quander Airpfeil
- Quander Micropfeil

=== Quasar ===
(Dolní Bečva, Czech Republic)

- Quasar 2000
- Quasar Flavio
- Quasar Relief
- Quasar Tramp

=== Queen ===
(Queen Aeroplane Co (Fdr: Willis McCormick), 197 St & Amsterdam Ave, Bronx Park, NY)

- Queen 1911 Monoplane
- Queen Aeroboat
- Queen Twin Monoplane
- Queen-Martin

=== Quénard ===
(Georges Quénard)

- Quénard 50

=== Quest Aircraft ===
- Quest Kodiak

=== Questair ===
(Questar Inc (Pres: James E Griswold), Greensboro, NC)

- Questair Venture

=== Quick ===
(Joseph & William Quick, Huntsville, AL)

- Quick 1908 Monoplane

=== Quick ===
(Quick Aeroplane Dusters, Houston, TX)

- Quick Special

=== Quickie ===
(Quickie Aircraft Corp (founders: Tom Jewett & Gene Sheehan), Mojave, CA)

- Rutan Quickie
- Quickie Q2
- Quickie Q200
- Quickie Free Enterprise a.k.a. Big Bird
- Super Quickie Q2

=== Quicksilver ===
(Quicksilver Manufacturing)

- Quicksilver GT400
- Quicksilver GT500
- Quicksilver MXL II SPORT
- Quicksilver SPORT 2S
- Quicksilver MX II SPRINT
- Quicksilver MX SPRINT
- Quicksilver MX SPORT
- Quicksilver MX II Sport

=== Quikkit ===
- Quikkit Glass Goose

=== Quinn ===
(E Quinn, Roebuck, SC)

- Quinn Sport
