= QAC Quickie Q2 =

American homebuilt aircraft design

Quickie Q2
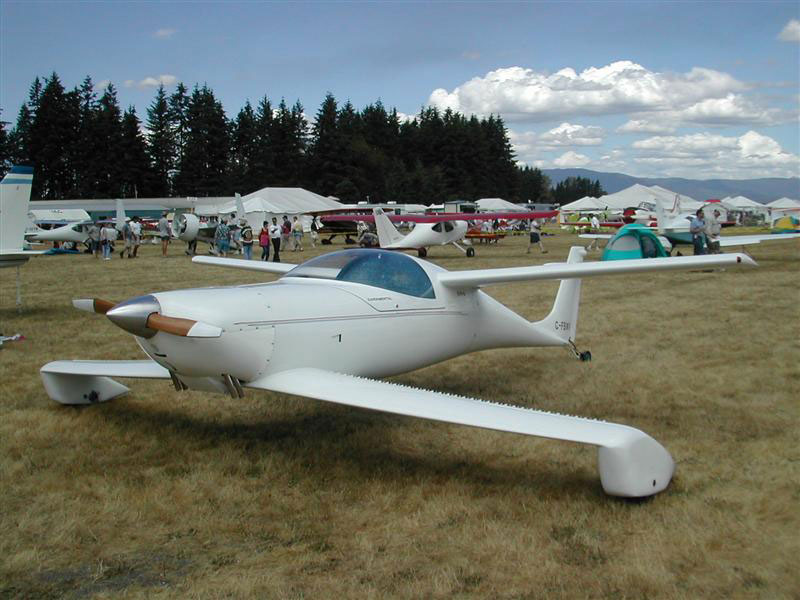
- Quickie Q2

General information
- Type: amateur-built airplane
- Manufacturer: Quickie Aircraft Corporation
- Designer: Garry LeGare, Tom Jewett and Gene Sheehan
- Status: kit production completed
- Number built: 2000+

History
- First flight: July 1980
- Developed from: Rutan Quickie

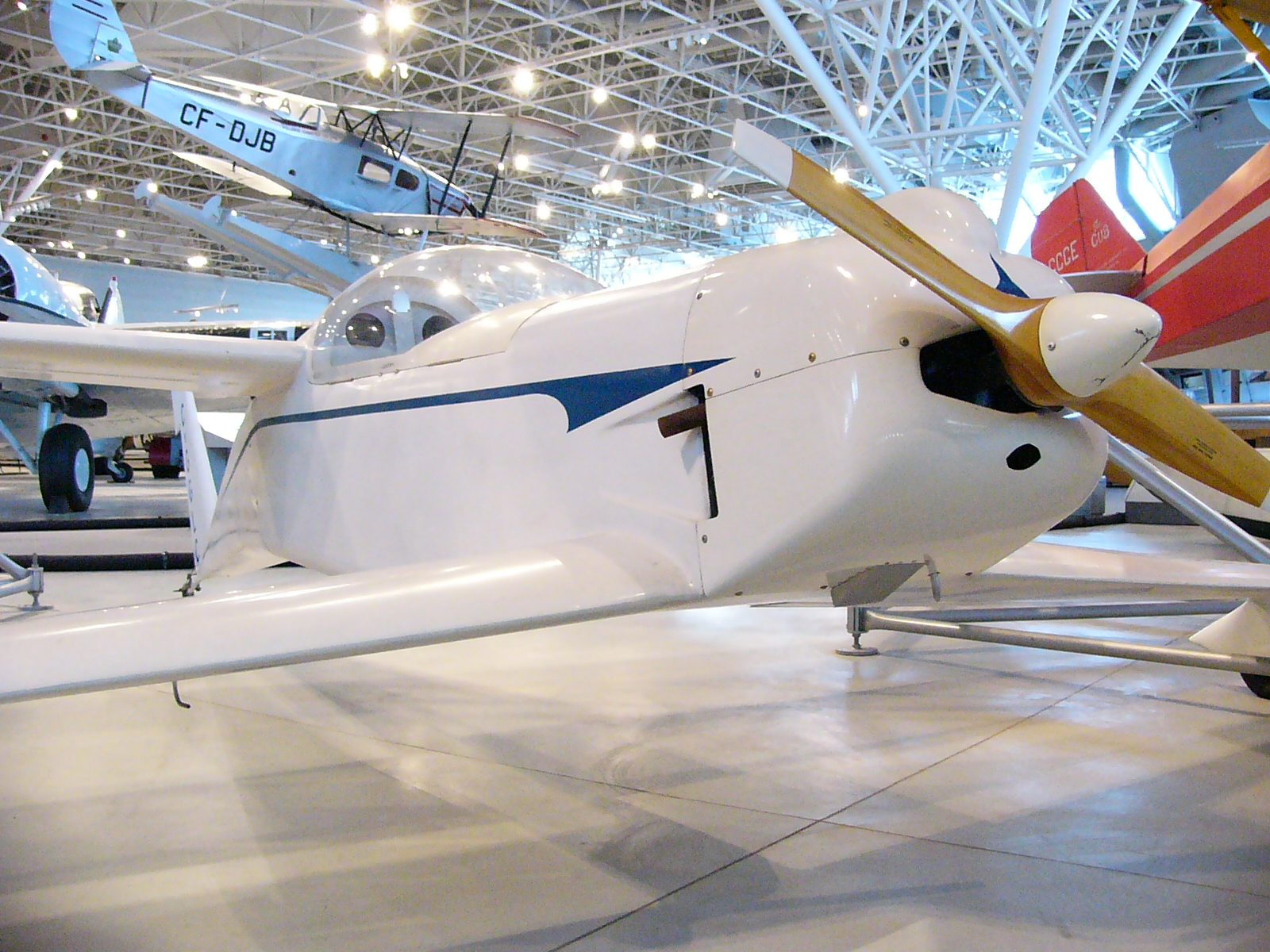
An original single-seat Rutan Quickie. This example is in the Canada Aviation and Space Museum.

The Quickie Q2 or Q2 is a two-seat version of the unique Rutan Quickie, produced in kit form by the Quickie Aircraft Corporation founded by Tom Jewett and Gene Sheehan. Canadian Garry LeGare was involved in the design.

The Q2 is a tandem wing design, having one forward wing (canard) and one rear wing (instead of the more usual main wing and horizontal stabilizer). The elevators are fitted to the forward wing so that all pitch control comes from the forward wing, similar to the canard configuration. The Q2 is a "taildragger" with fixed (non-retractable) main wheels incorporated into integral streamlined wheel pants located at the tips of the forward wing.

As efficient as the original Q1 design, the Q2 is of composite construction.

== Design and development ==
The Q2 followed Jewett's and Sheehan's intention to design a two-seat homebuilt aircraft.

An amateur aircraft builder who had already built a Rutan VariEze, LeGare suggested a two-place side-by-side development of the Quickie equipped with a larger Volkswagen derived engine. At the time, Sheehan and Jewett were not interested so LeGare fabricated a single proof of concept prototype.

Unlike the original single-seat Quickie, Rutan was not involved with the design of the Q2, but it retains the Rutan tandem wing solution to the design challenges associated with low drag, high-efficiency design, with a fixed undercarriage and a useful center of gravity range. Pilot and passenger seating placement was close to the center of gravity, the integral wheel pants substantially reduced parasitic drag, and the tandem wing placement and decalage made for natural angle-of-attack limiting (i.e., natural stall recovery with a pitch buck onset). The aircraft was a point design, configured at a time of high fuel prices, increasing costs for the sport pilot, and in the wake of the Bede BD-5.

The Q2 was configured as a "taildragger" with fixed (non-retractable) integral wheel pants at the tips of a forward wing with a noticeable adhedral. The wheel pants acted as endplates (increasing effective aspect ratio) and constraining spanwise flow. As a result, the original aircraft configuration was an effective ekranoplan and exhibited surface effect phenomenon when within a half wingspan distance from the ground. The absence of separate landing gear in the original configurations (e.g. Q-1 through Q-200) reduced both weight and drag; however, much of the configurational advantage was lost in the Tri-Q modification. Propeller ground clearance was a problem in the early Quickie aircraft fabricated with highly flexible fiberglass spar caps... and those aircraft were susceptible to prop-strikes during hard landings. Subsequently, the use of full span, tapered, carbon fiber spars in the Q-200 added significant stiffness to the forward wing/canard. This development substantially reduced the tendency of the aircraft to porpoise and experience propeller damage.

Full-span elevators were fitted to the forward wing such that all pitch control came from the forward wing, similar to the canard configuration. The forward wing in this configuration provided about 60% of the lift. The close proximity of the engine/propeller to the forward wing made for a powered lift effect with instantaneous climb response to power inputs. The ailerons were located inboard on the aft wing, which was shoulder-mounted centrally, just aft of the pilot. This aileron placement reduced any tendency to aileron induced yaw; a properly built aircraft would enter a coordinated turn with the pilots feet off the rudder pedals. The canard layout provided positive lift from both pairs of wings, whereas a conventional tailplane supplies negative lift. However, the principal advantage to the Q2/Q200 configuration was probably the reduced size and, therefore, reduced flat plate, wetted area and drag associated with the airframe integration.

Q-2/Q-200 pilot controls included a central sidestick controlled by the right hand and a throttle controlled by the left hand. As the pitch and roll control linkages were via a pushrod, the aircraft was very responsive. Routine installations were the inclusion of an aileron reflexor and mid-fuselage belly-board speed brake. The rudder pedals were cable-linked directly to a steerable tailwheel bellcrank, and then via secondary cables to the rudder; this per-plans configuration led to multiple runway mishaps resulting from damage to the fiberglass tailspring that supported the tailwheel bellcrank and subsequent loss of directional control. Many builders addressed this tailwheel design weakness by the placement of a dedicated bellcrank within the aft fuselage and then splitting independent cables to the rudder and tailwheel individually. The Q2/Q200 series of aircraft were highly sensitive to builder variation and required special attention to the ground angle of attack and tailwheel hinge geometry; and, at this stage of American kitplane development, prefabrication of critical components simply was not yet a feature. In flight, the aircraft exhibited Cooper-Harper level 3 flying qualities requiring some degree of pilot compensation during some maneuvers and phases of flight. The Q-200 could be noticeably sensitive in pitch. The recommended landing technique was via a backside approach to the runway threshold. Once on the ground, the aircraft was known to exhibit reversed stick steering if the ailerons were actuated at medium to high speed; this was typically corrected by a neutral control stick and normal rudder correction.

The prototype Q2 was constructed in Canada by Garry LeGare at his Leg-Air Aviation, Ltd., facility in Langley, British Columbia. The airplane was constructed of fiberglass and resin over a foam core, similar to other Rutan designs; the wings essentially blue styrofoam billets cut to shape with a hot wire, followed by microslurry and resin/fiberglass layup; the fuselage was made up of one inch-thick foam slabs with microslurry and resin/fiberglass layup. Subsequent Q-2/Q-200 kit aircraft included fully lofted and prefabricated fuselage shells. The fuselage shells were vacuum bagged in molds and made of inner and outer fiberglass facing with a 3/8 inch Clark foam core.

=== Production ===
In June 1978, only two months after the single-seat Quickie prototype's first flight, Jewett and Sheehan had formed the Quickie Aircraft Corporation to produce and sell complete kits of Quickie layout, first single-seaters, then two-seaters. Kit production commenced in 1980, with over 2000 kits sold before production ended.

LeGare and Quickie formed an agreement: While Quickie handled domestic sales within the United States, LeGare would handle export sales. In practice, the export sales were shipped directly from Quickie in California.

== Variants ==
Quickie Q2
This two-seat aircraft employed a 64-horsepower (48 kW) Volkswagen air-cooled engine and could be constructed as a Tri-Q with tricycle rather than conventional landing gear.

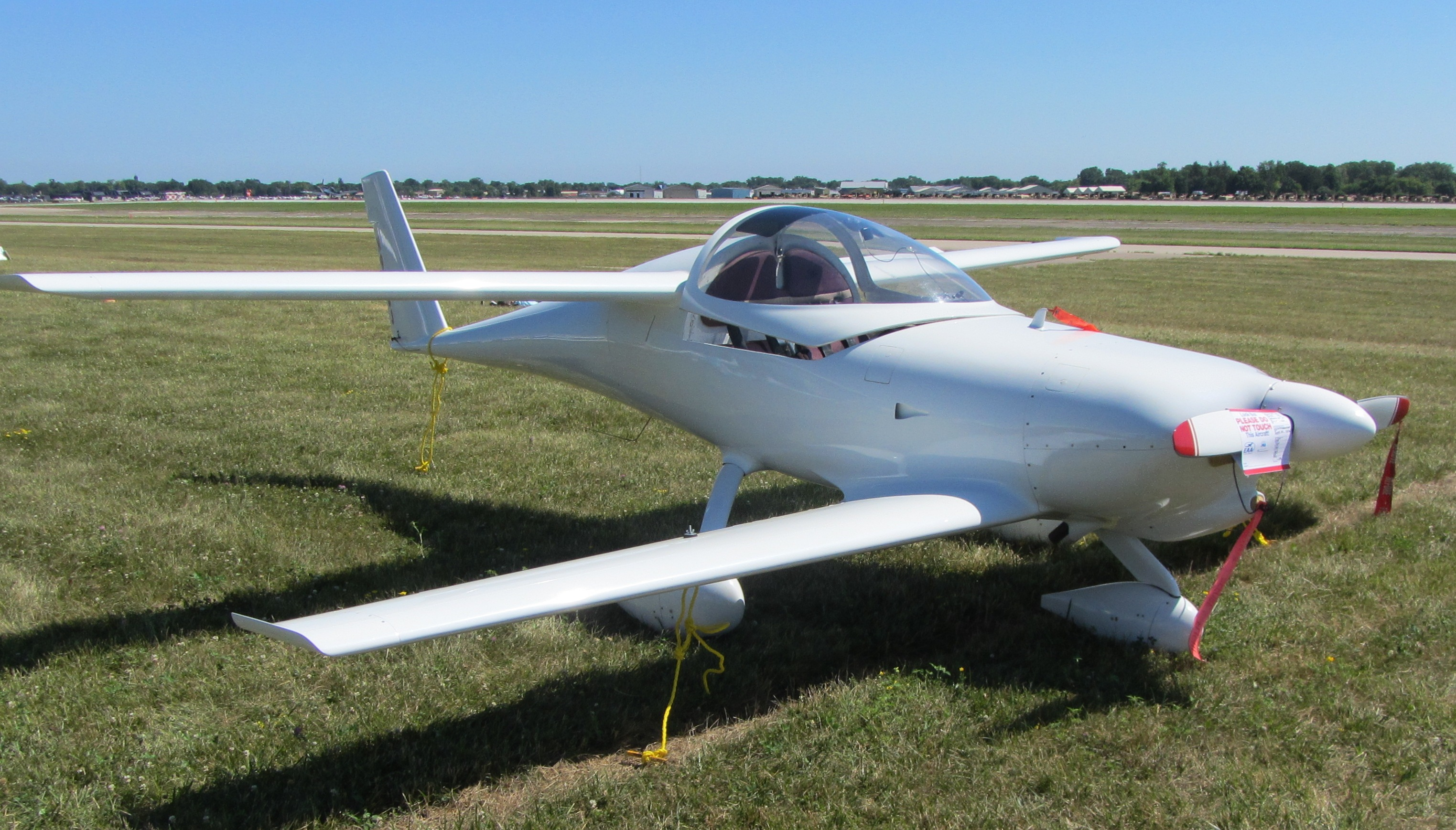
TriQ-200 with tricycle gear

Q200
This two-seat aircraft was substantially faster than the Q2, with a 100-horsepower (78 kW) Continental O-200 engine and employed an LS-1 airfoil for the canard to avoid canard leading edge contamination issues. Q-200 aircraft have been powered with other engines, including Mazda, Subaru, Rotax, and Corvair engines in the same horsepower range, with varying degrees of success. It can also be constructed as a Tri-Q with tricycle, rather than conventional landing gear.

== Aircraft on display ==
- Evergreen Aviation & Space Museum
- The Hangar Flight Museum
- Single place Quickie, Smithsonian National Air and Space Museum in Washington, D.C.

== Specifications (Quickie Q2) ==
Data from QuickieBuilders and Western Canada Aviation Museum

General characteristics

- Crew: one pilot
- Capacity: one passenger and 510 lb (231 kg) useful load
- Length: 19 ft 10 in (6.05 m)
- Wingspan: 16 ft 8 in (5.08 m)
- Height: 4 ft 5 in (1.35 m)
- Wing area: 67 sq ft (6.22 m^{2})
- Empty weight: 490 lb (222 kg)
- Max takeoff weight: 1,000 lb (454 kg)
- Powerplant: 1 × Revmaster 2100-DQ converted auto-engine, 64 hp (47.7 kW) at 3,200 rpm

Performance

- Maximum speed: 180 mph (290 km/h, 160 kn)
- Cruise speed: 140 mph (225 km/h, 120 kn)
- Never exceed speed: 200 mph (322 km/h, 170 kn)
- Range: 550 mi (885 km, 480 nmi)
- Rate of climb: 1,200 ft/min (6.10 m/s)

== Gallery ==
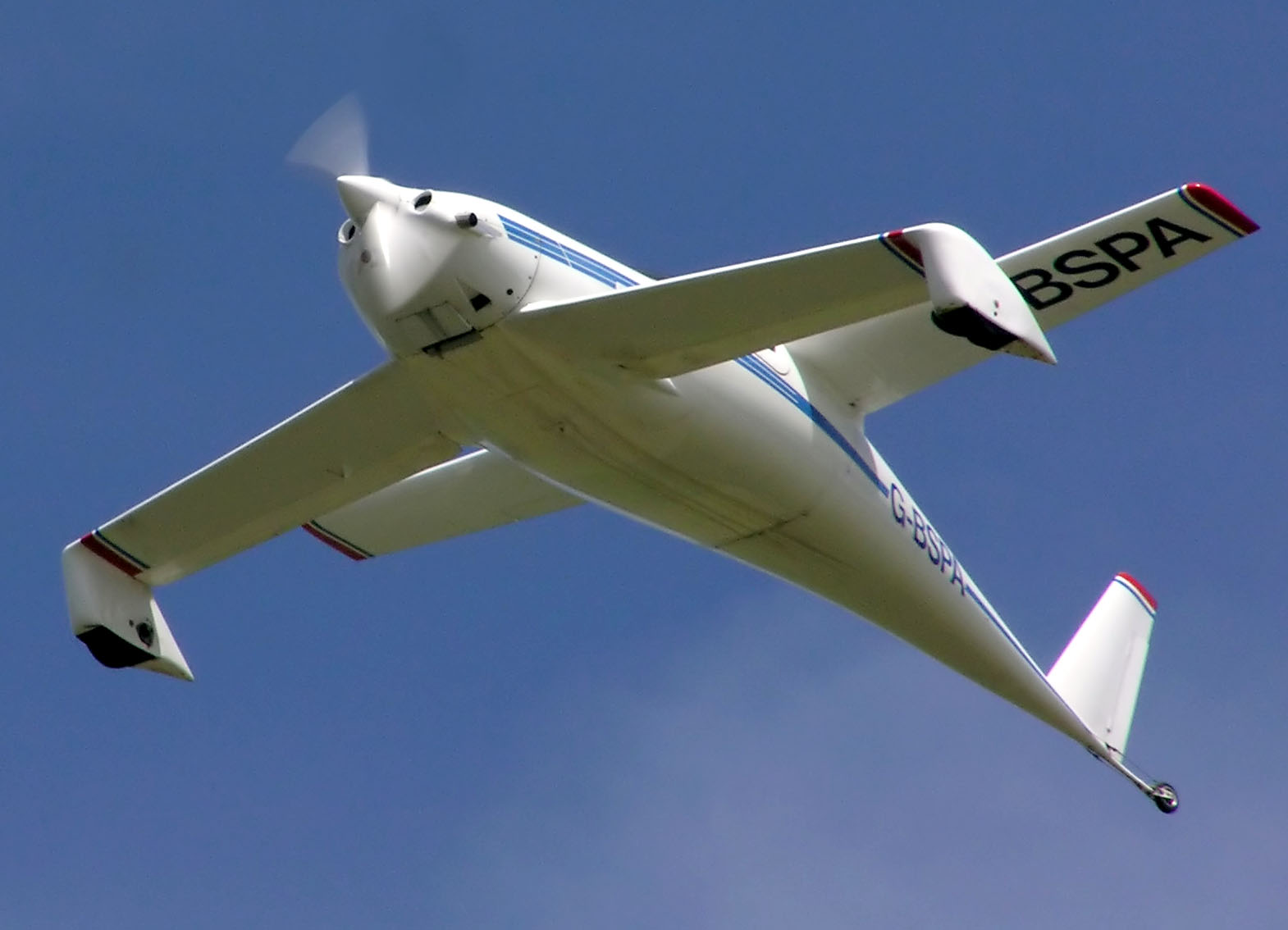
Q2 in flight

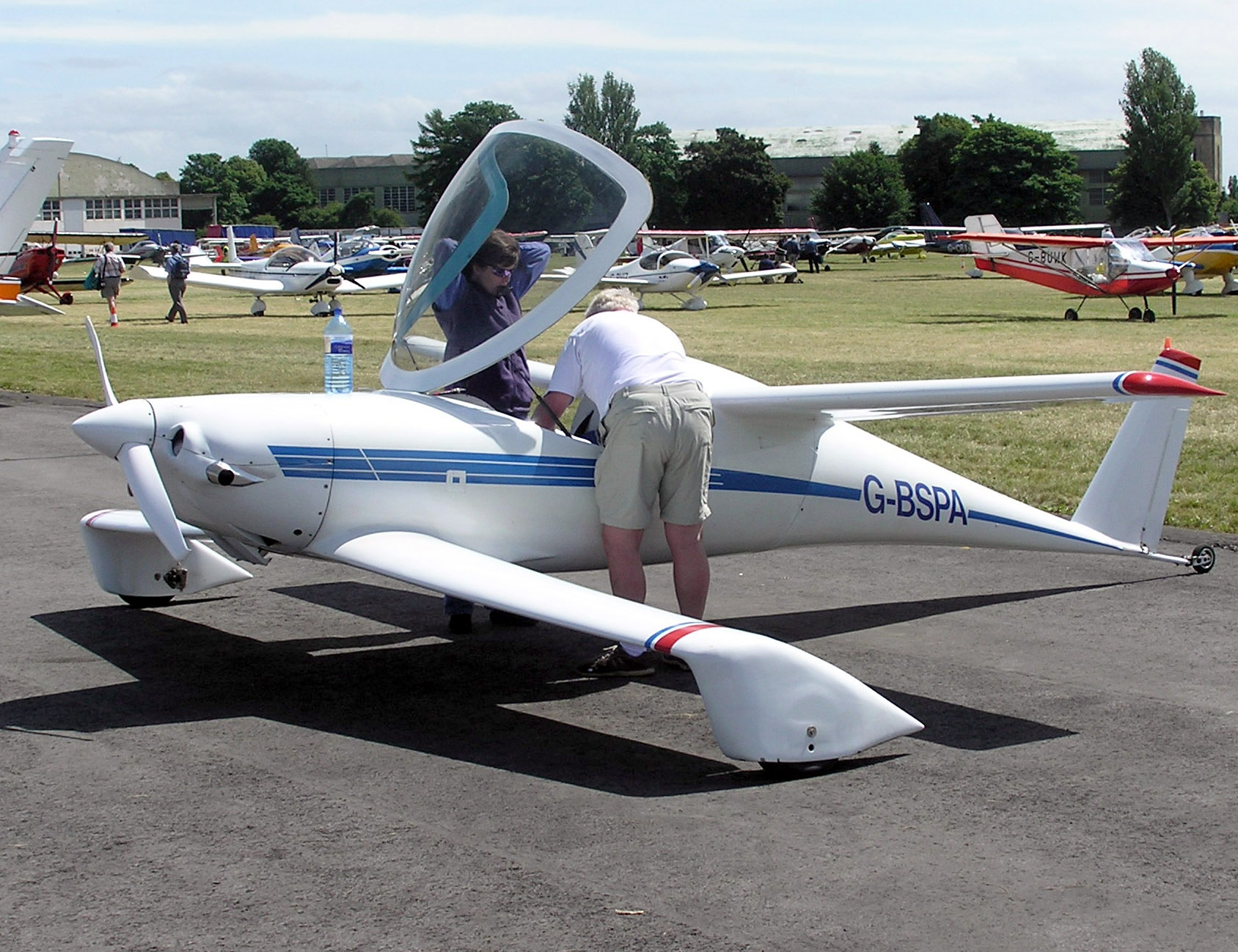
Q2, canopy up

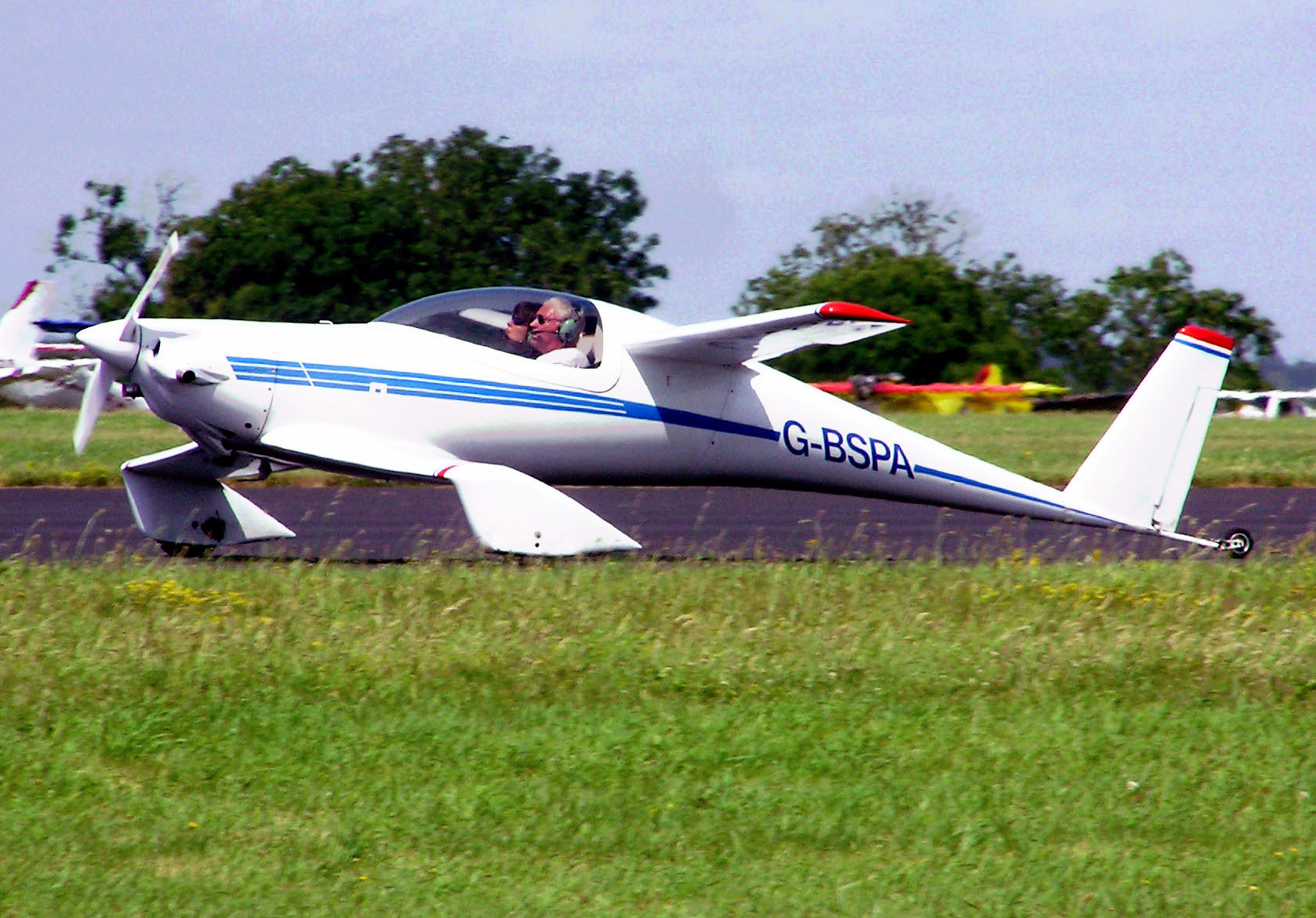
Q2, side view

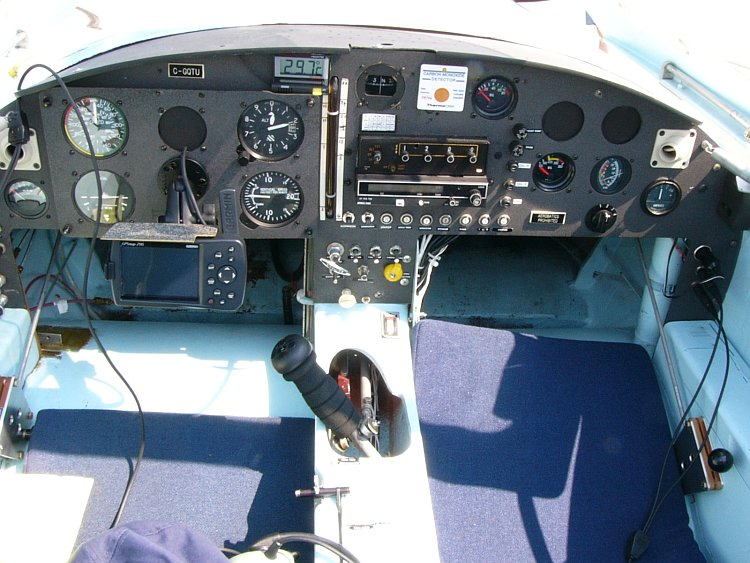
typical Q2 builder-designed instrument panel

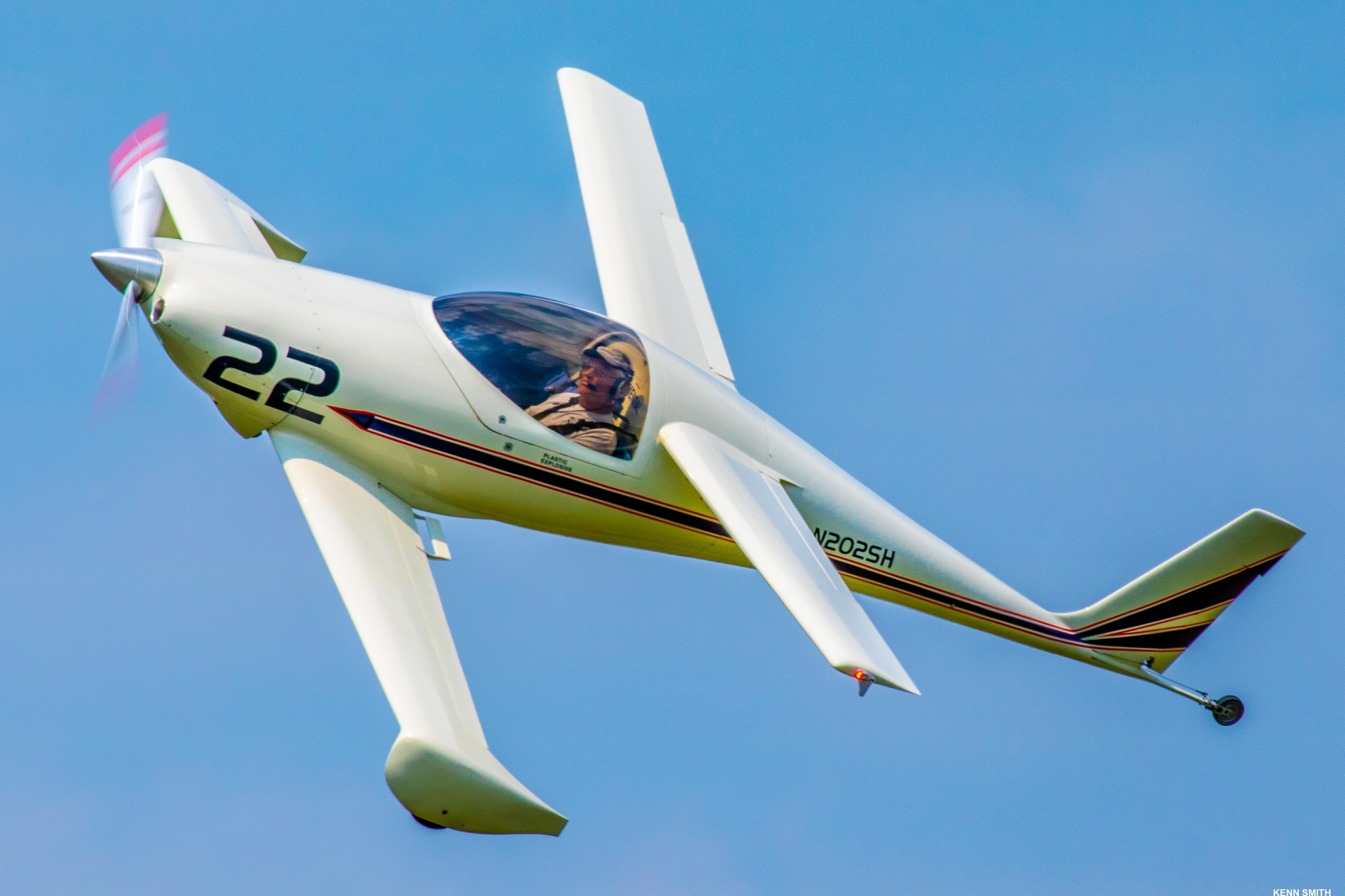
Q-200 modified for racing.

== See also ==
- AMSOIL Racer
- Quickie Free Enterprise
- Scaled Composites
- The Q-List - Quickie builders self-help group. Email list and extensive collection of builder's photos, suggested modifications and builders tips.

Aircraft of comparable role, configuration, and era

- Rutan Quickie
- Viking Dragonfly
