= Thompson Boxmoth =

Boxmoth

General information
- Type: Homebuilt aircraft
- National origin: United States
- Manufacturer: Thompson Aircraft Company
- Designer: Richard Thompson
- Number built: 1

History
- First flight: November 1975

The Thompson Boxmoth is an American unconventional tandem wing aircraft that was built in the early 1970s by the Thompson Aircraft Company. Patent US39309624, Jan 6, 1976. Only one was constructed.

== Design and development ==
The Boxmoth is an open frame, conventional landing gear equipped aircraft with two tube made, vinyl covered wings in tandem. Each of pair of the box-wings are shaped like a diamond from the front, or a biplane configuration with the wings joined at the outboard wingtips. The rear wing acts as a tailplane and houses a vertical internal rudder surface. The configuration is also similar to a rhomboidal box kite. The engine and propeller are mounted in the center of the forward wing. The fuselage is constructed from aluminum tubing with aircraft fabric covering.

== Specifications (Boxmoth) ==
Data from Jane's all the world's aircraft 1979-80

General characteristics

- Crew: One
- Length: 26 ft (7.9 m)
- Wingspan: 34 ft (10 m)
- Height: 11 ft (3.4 m)
- Wing area: 400 sq ft (37 m^{2})
- Propellers: 2-bladed Wood, 6 ft (1.8 m) diameter

Performance

- Maximum speed: 39 kn (45 mph, 72 km/h)
- Cruise speed: 35 kn (40 mph, 65 km/h)
- Stall speed: 26 kn (30 mph, 48 km/h)
- Never exceed speed: 48 kn (55 mph, 89 km/h)
- Range: 173 nmi (199 mi, 320 km)
- Service ceiling: 10,000 ft (3,000 m)
- Wing loading: 2 lb/sq ft (9.8 kg/m^{2})

== See also ==
- Forbes & Arnold monoplane, a 1910s aircraft with a similar configuration

Aircraft of comparable role, configuration, and era

- Mignet Pou-du-Ciel
- Rutan Quickie
