= Zanesville Municipal Airport =

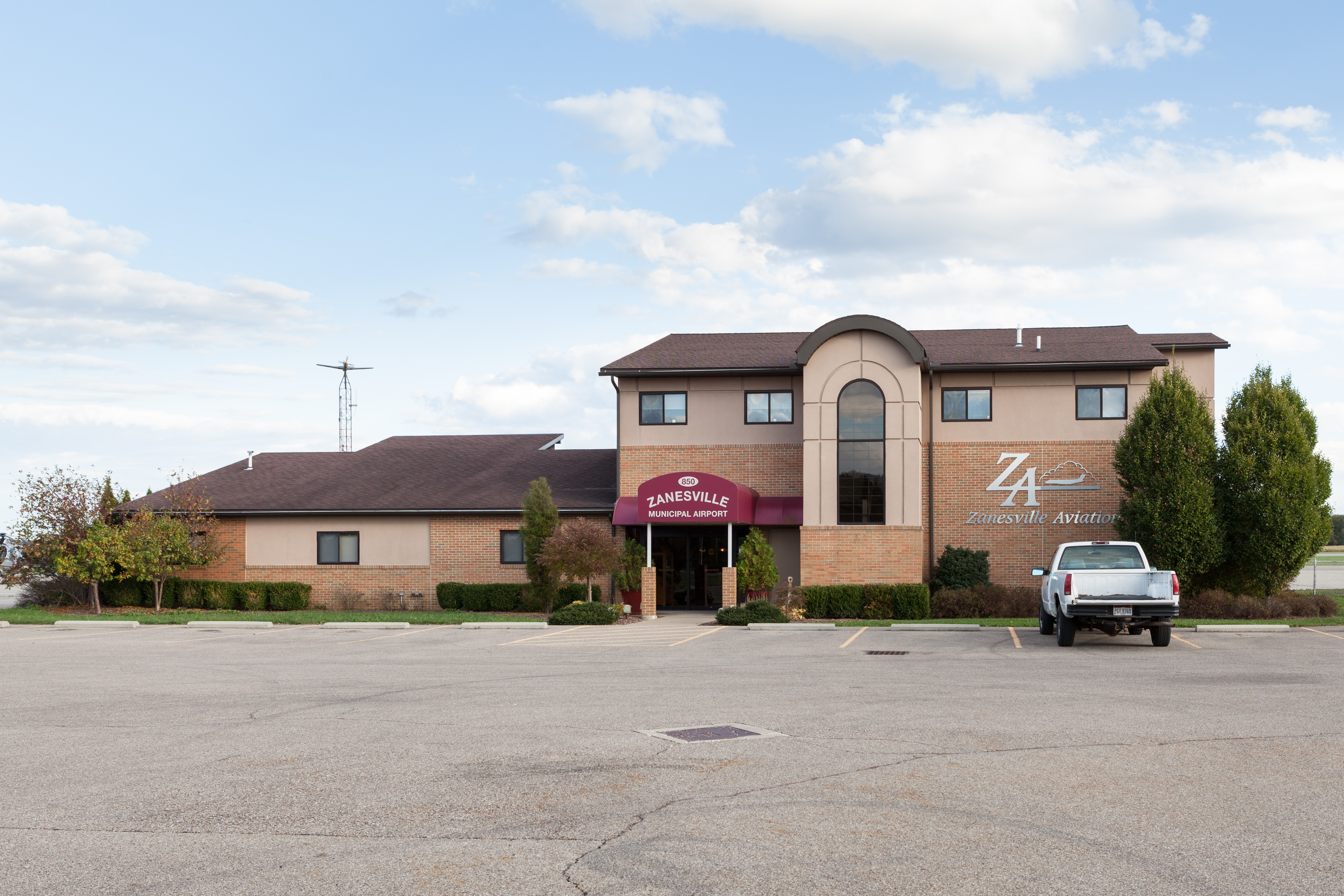
- Terminal building in 2015
- IATA: ZZV; ICAO: KZZV; FAA LID: ZZV

Summary
- Airport type: Public
- Owner: City of Zanesville
- Serves: Zanesville, Ohio
- Elevation AMSL: 900 ft / 274 m
- Coordinates: 39°56′40″N 081°53′32″W

Map

Runways
Direction	Length		Surface
Direction	ft	m	Surface
04/22	4,999	1,524	Asphalt/Concrete
16/34	4,998	1,523	Asphalt/Concrete

Statistics (2020)
- Aircraft operations (year ending 6/12/2020): 33,312
- Based aircraft: 25
- Source: Federal Aviation Administration

Zanesville Municipal Airport (IATA: ZZV, ICAO: KZZV, FAA LID: ZZV) is a city-owned airport six miles east of downtown Zanesville, in Muskingum County, Ohio. The National Plan of Integrated Airport Systems for 2011–2015 called it a general aviation facility.

== History ==
Initially, plans released in October 1941 called for more than doubling the size of Zanesville's existing airport with the acquisition of nearby land. Authorization for an $868,000 federal grant to improve the field was given in early October 1942.

An approximately 600-acre (240 ha) site 5.5 miles (8.9 km) east of the city was selected for the new airport in early December 1942 and by 5 April 1943, settlements had been reached with all but one of the 61 landowners whose property was needed. However, it had been discovered that the available funds were insufficient for the purpose. To help make up the difference, the chamber of commerce agreed to purchase the old municipal airport from the city the following day. N. E. Daugherty Construction, one of fifteen companies to submit bids five days earlier, was awarded the contract to build the airport on 17 May 1943.

The first airplane to land at the airport, a C-47, arrived in mid September 1944 carrying five wounded soldiers. However, with the arrival of a second airplane the following day, additional flights to the field were halted due to the lack of radio equipment. By late the following month, the airport was nearly complete – missing only the necessary radio equipment. In early November was announced that said equipment would be moved from the nearby Cambridge airport. (Note: The airport in Cambridge was too small to handle the ambulance aircraft.) A suggestion in March 1945 that an access road to the airport be built to reduce travel time of wounded soldiers to Fletcher General Hospital in Cambridge was rejected by the federal government. (Note: The Zanesville airport was 55 miles (89 km) closer than the airport in Columbus to which the aircraft had since been diverted.) In the midst of a debate over the access road, an SB2C on a delivery flight from a plant in Columbus made an emergency landing at the unfinished airport, highlighting its importance. The airport was opened on 23 May 1945 when radio communications were finally made operational.

One year later, despite 430 medical airplanes having used the airport, it was poorly maintained and still had only minimal facilities. Airline service began on 1 November 1947 when two TWA airliners landed at the airport. However, it was recognized that to maintain airline interest a permanent terminal building would required. To that end, a fundraising drive to provide for the construction of one began five days later. Following completion of the structure, the airport was dedicated on 18 September 1949. TWA's decision to end flights to Zanesville was upheld by the Civil Aeronautics Board and in mid-April 1953 Lake Central Airlines took over responsibility. By early January 1954, two t-hangars capable of housing twelve airplanes had been built; a fixed-base operator, Southeastern Ohio Air Service, had moved from the old municipal airport and the 268th Communications Squadron of the Ohio Air National Guard was headquartered at the airport. By late September 1956, it was anticipated that a TVOR beacon would be installed on airport grounds.

A failure of the airport to provide a federally mandated minimum requirement of five passengers led to a CAB hearing in August 1960 over the potential end of airline service. As a result of testimony that the underperformance was a result of poor service, Lake Central pledged to increase the number of flights. An appeal by Zanesville political and business leaders to Senator Frank Lausche in May 1962 resulted in the decision that a full interchange would be built on Interstate 70 north of the airport instead of the initially proposed small turn road. An announcement in February 1964 that the FAA was planning to close the flight service station at the airport and replace it with remote service was met with opposition from local authorities. A subsequent unsolicited federal grant for an 800-foot (240 m) runway extension was rejected by the airport later that year. The last airline flight occurred in early January 1970 when Allegheny Airlines, who acquired Lake Central, ended operations at the airport. By late March 1976, a VASI, new taxi- and runway lights and a new airport beacon had been installed. The apron was also expanded to handle a growth in flights.

A decision in early 1981 by the CAB was expected to provide for two daily flights to either Columbus or Pittsburgh. However, by October this appeared unlikely. Drafting of a land use plan for the airport began in February 1984. Less than a month later, Federal Express announced plans to begin using the airport. Then, in April, the airport received a federal grant to install a VASI and REILs.

A report prepared in mid 1991 proposed mining 400-acre (160 ha) on the east side of the airport for coal. However, the plan was eventually dropped and the FAA gave approval for a 150-acre (61 ha) industrial park around the airport in May 1993. By mid February 1996, construction of a 170,000-square-foot (16,000 m^{2}) industrial plant in the adjacent Airport Distribution Park was almost complete. The next month, it was noted that the old terminal building had fallen into disrepair and a new one was being built. Purchase of an ILS was being considered in January 1997. Preparations to bring an F-105 to the airport for display were underway in April 1999.

The airport received a federal grant to rehabilitate runway 04/22 in August 2002. By 2003, a new lease had been approved, the ILS was nearly installed and a 14,400-square-foot (1,340 m^{2}) hangar was being built.

The city announced it would be updating the master plan for the airport in June 2019.

== Facilities ==
Zanesville Municipal Airport covers 534 acres (216 ha) at an elevation of 900 feet (274 m). It has two asphalt/concrete runways: 04/22 is 4,999 by 150 feet (1,524 x 46 m) and 16/34 is 4,998 by 75 feet (1,524 x 23 m).

The airport has a fixed-base operator that sells fuel. It offers services such as general maintenance, hangars, courtesy cars, and rental cars; it also offers amenities such as conference rooms, vending machines, a crew lounge, and snooze rooms.

In the year ending June 12, 2020, the airport had 33,312 aircraft operations, average 91 per day: 95% general aviation, 3% air taxi, and 1% military. 25 aircraft were then based at the airport: 14 single-engine and 5 multi-engine airplanes as well as 6 jet aircraft.

== Accidents and incidents ==
- On 26 June 1954, a Boeing KC-97 Stratofreighter made an emergency landing at the Zanesville Municipal Airport after developing engine troubles.
- On 15 July 1973, a Piper Cherokee crashed while landing at the airport, killing the two occupants.
- On 13 August 1981, a Cessna 210 made an emergency landing at the airport after suffering a mid-air collision with another single-engine airplane.
- On 31 May 2016, a Viking SF-2A Cygnet experienced a runway excursion while landing at the Zanesville Municipal Airport. The tailwheel-equipped airplane's pilot eported that, during the landing roll in crosswind conditions, the airplane veered off the runway to the left. During the accident sequence, the pilot braked "too hard" in an attempt to avoid a drainage ditch and subsequently flipped over. The probable cause of the accident was found to be the pilot's failure to maintain directional control during the landing roll, which resulted in a runway excursion, and a nose over.

== See also ==
- List of airports in Ohio
