= Viking Aircraft LLC =

American homebuilt aircraft manufacturer

Viking Aircraft, LLC.
- Company type: Privately held company
- Industry: Aerospace
- Headquarters: Elkhorn, Wisconsin, United States
- Key people: Robin M. Taylor
- Products: Aircraft plans
- Website: vikingaircraft.com

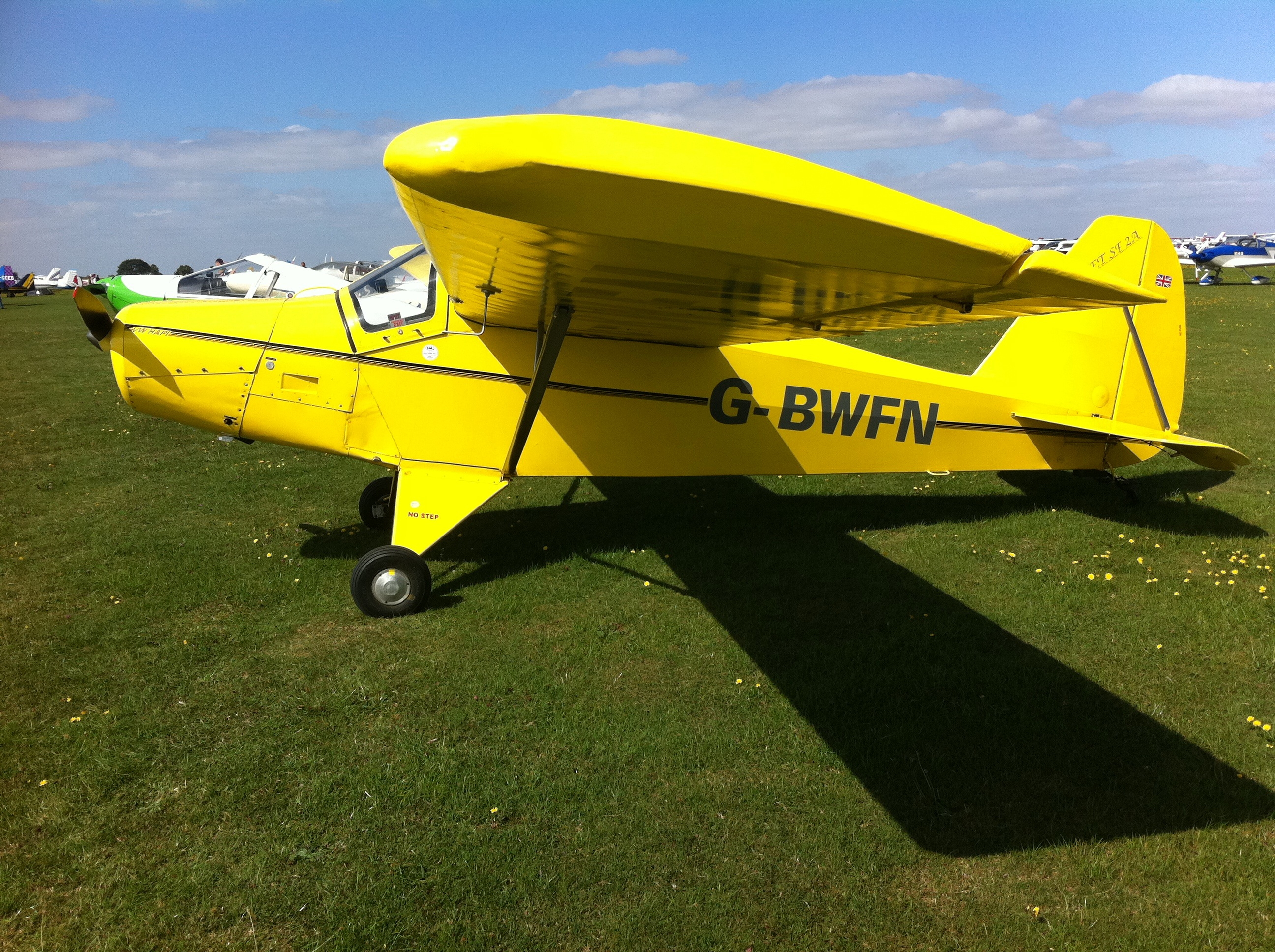
Viking SF-2A Cygnet

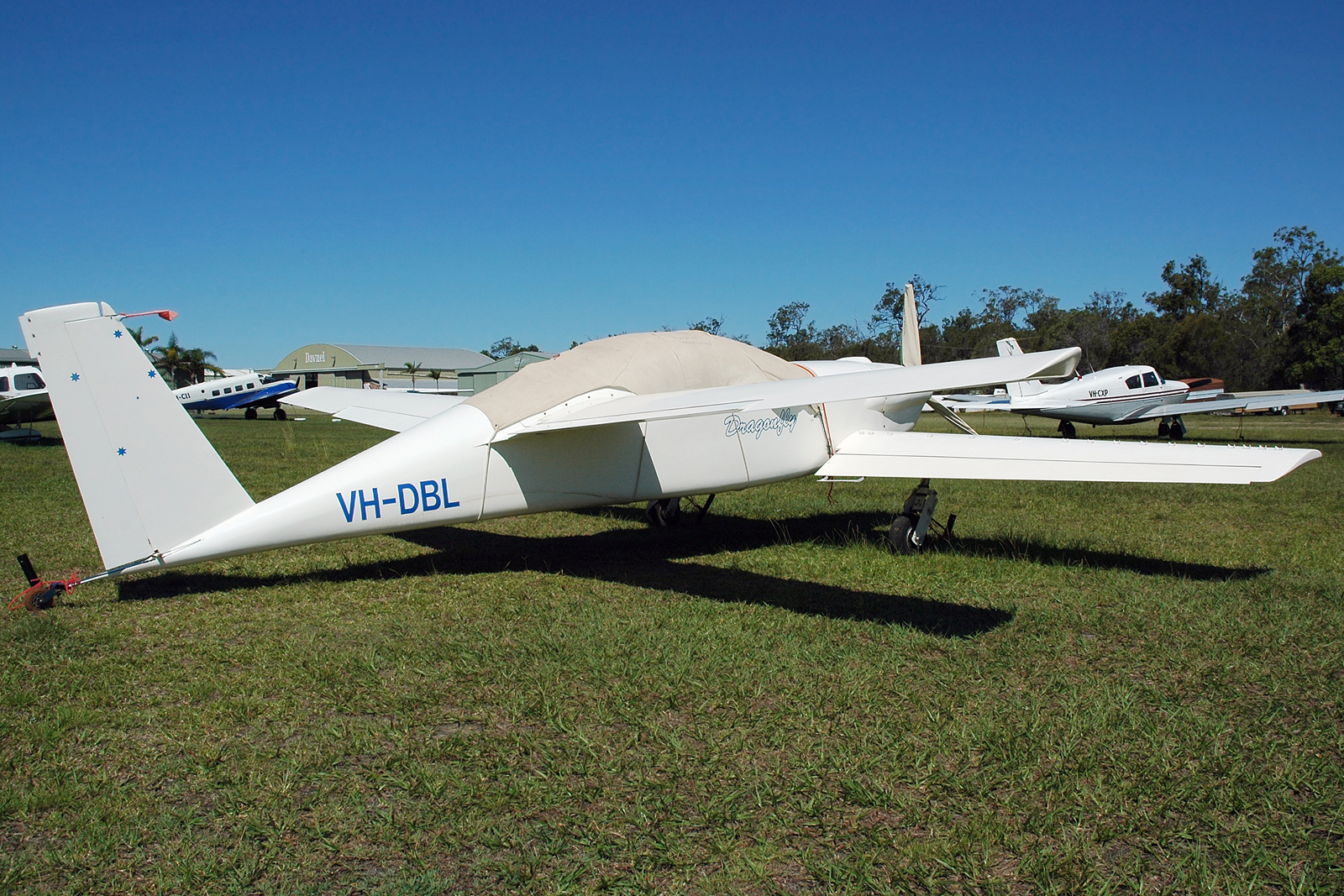
Dragonfly Mk 2

Viking Aircraft LLC is an American aircraft manufacturer based in Elkhorn, Wisconsin. The company specializes in the provision of homebuilt aircraft plans for amateur construction.

In 1998 the company was known as Viking Aircraft Inc., but in 2008 seems to have been registered as Viking Aircraft, LLC, with Robin M. Taylor as agent.

The company sells plans for the Bert Sisler-designed Viking SF-2A Cygnet of which more than 100 were flown by 2003. The company also at one time supplied plans for the Rutan Quickie-derived Bob Walters-designed Viking Dragonfly, of which more than 500 were completed by 2003.

== Aircraft ==
Summary of aircraft built by Viking Aircraft
Model name	First flight	Number built	Type
Viking Dragonfly	June 16, 1980	more than 500 (2003)	A development of the Rutan Quickie design by Bob Walters
Viking SF-2A Cygnet	1973	100 (2003)	A Bert Sisler design
