= Viking Dragonfly =

American homebuilt aircraft

Dragonfly
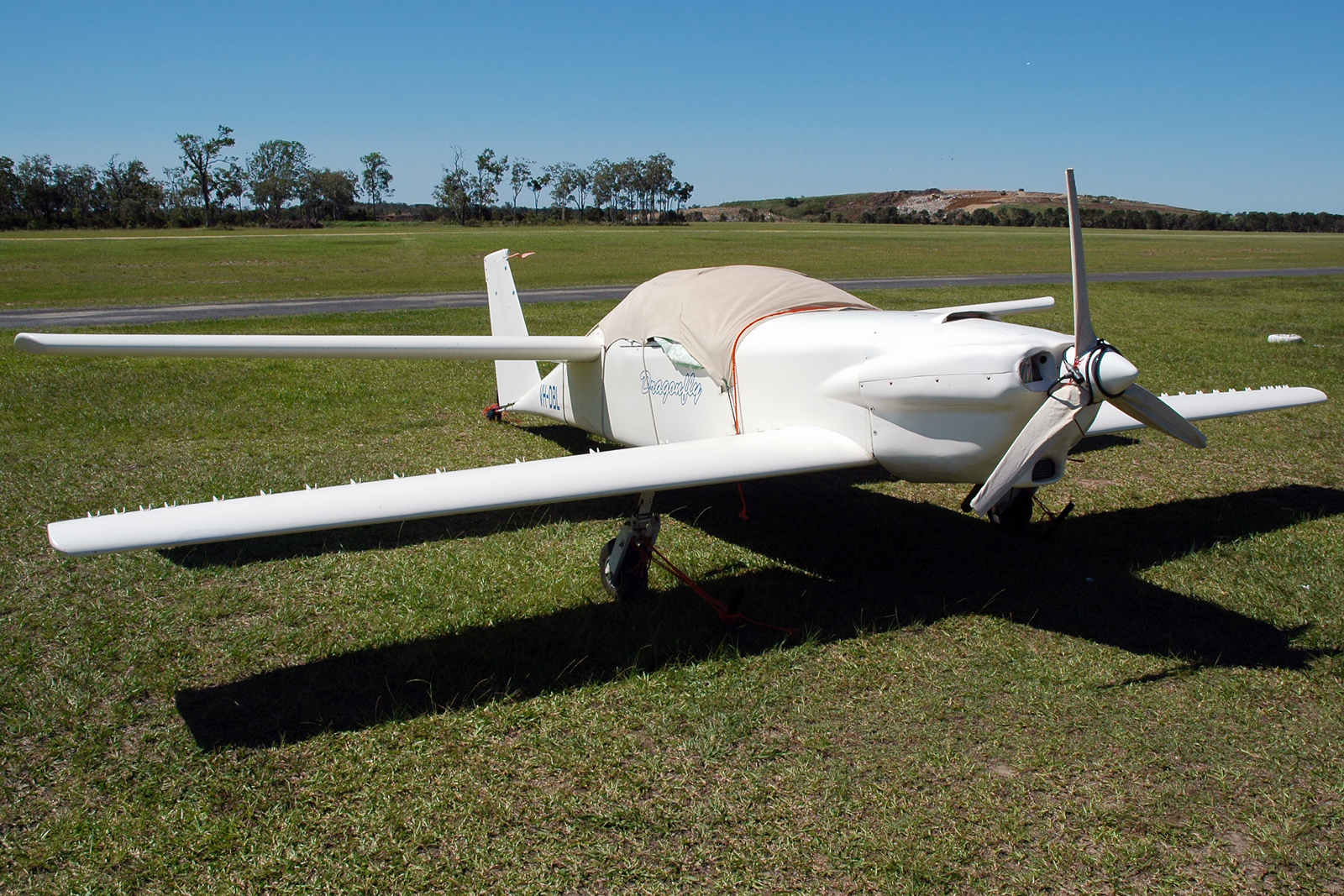
- Dragonfly Mk II

General information
- Type: Light aircraft
- National origin: United States of America
- Manufacturer: Viking Aircraft LLC

History
- First flight: June 16, 1980
- Developed from: Rutan Quickie

The Viking Dragonfly is an American amateur-built aircraft, designed by Bob Walters and produced by Viking Aircraft LLC of Elkhorn, Wisconsin. The aircraft is supplied as a kit or as plans for amateur construction.

== Design and development ==
The Dragonfly is a two-seater aircraft that features a tandem wing layout with a forward wing mounted low and the other behind the cockpit in a shoulder position, a two-seats-in-side-by-side configuration enclosed cockpit under a bubble canopy, fixed landing gear and a single engine in tractor configuration. The cockpit is 43 in (109 cm) wide

The aircraft is constructed from composites, based on construction techniques pioneered by Burt Rutan at Rutan Aircraft Factory (RAF). The airframe design is visually similar to the RAF's Quickie 2, which was developed independently, but the Dragonfly has larger airfoils and a smaller engine, resulting in a slower but more docile handling aircraft. Its forward 20 ft (6.1 m) span wing employs a GU25-5(11)8 mod airfoil, when the aft wing (span 22 ft) uses an Eppler 1212 airfoil. Both wings have a total area of 92.2 sq ft (8.57 m^{2}). Standard engines used include the 60 hp (45 kW) Volkswagen air-cooled engine and the 85 hp (63 kW) Jabiru 2200 four-stroke powerplants. Construction time from the supplied kit is estimated as 700 hours, while from plans is estimated at over 1200 hours.

== Operational history ==
The Dragonfly was given the Outstanding New Design Award at the EAA Convention in 1980. By 1998, 500 examples of all variants were reported as flying.

== Variants ==
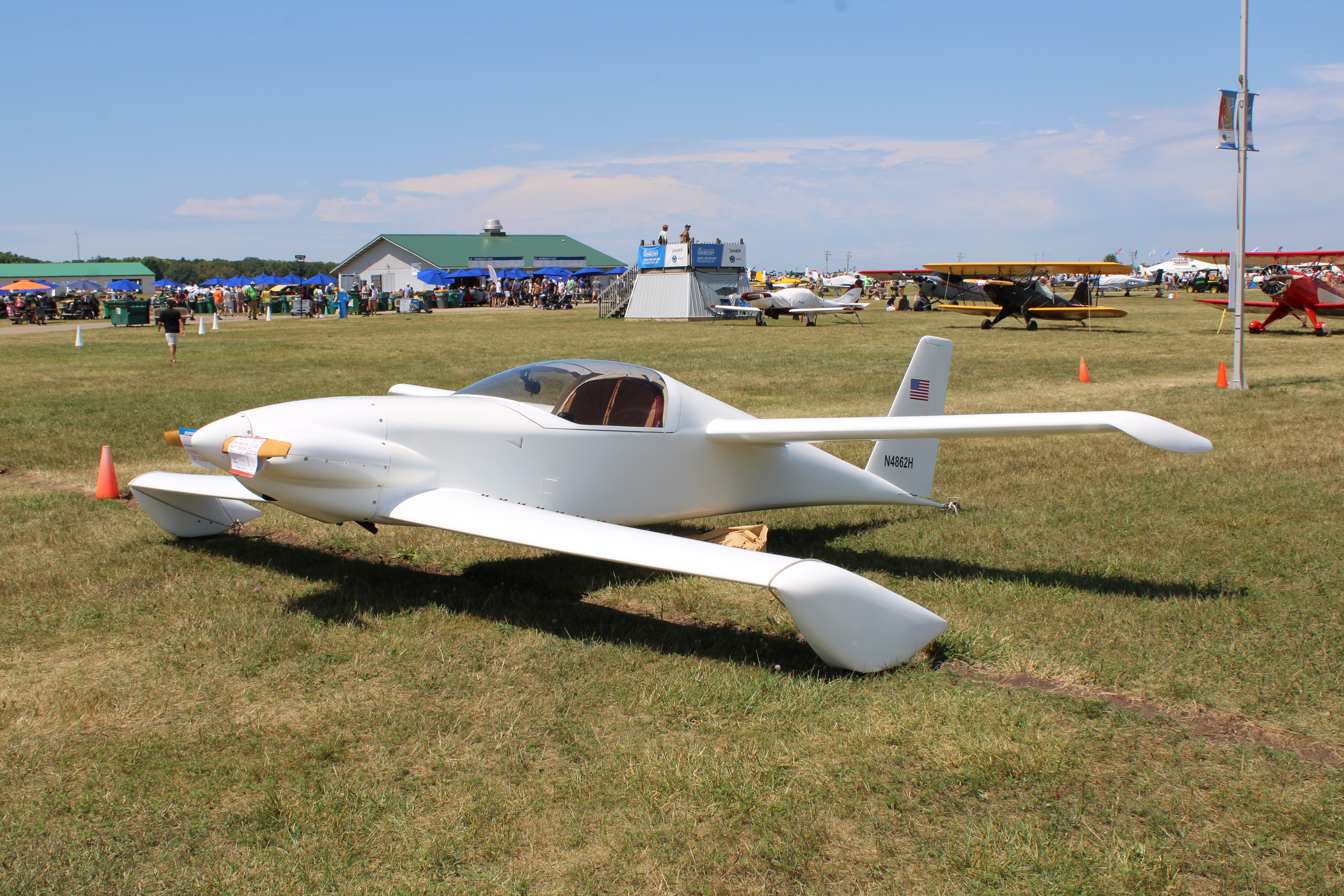
Dragonfly Mk I

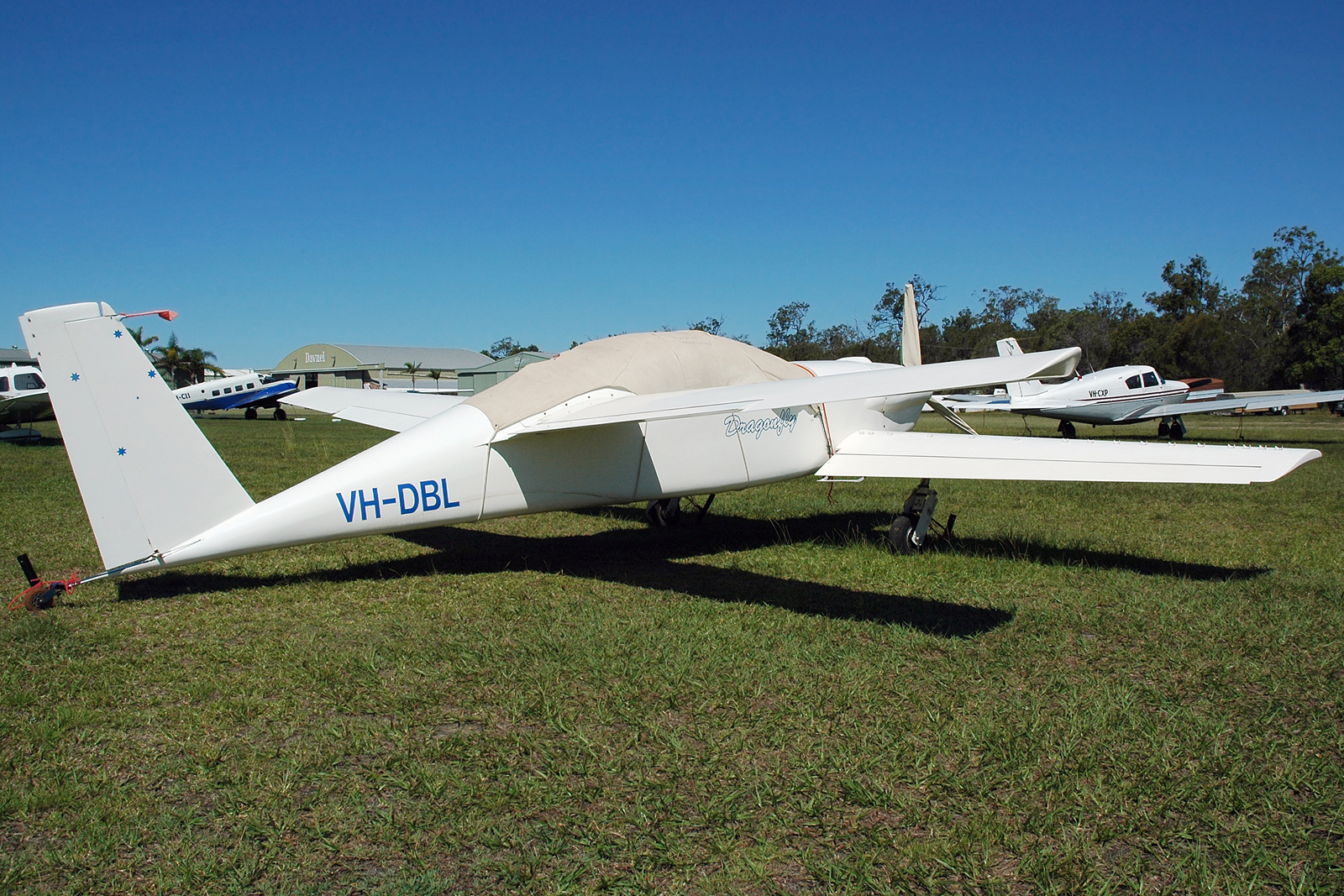
Dragonfly Mk II

Dragonfly Mk I
Original version with main landing gear mounted in fairings at the lower wing tips. Operations require paved runways and wide taxiways due to widely spaced main wheels.
Dragonfly Mk II
Version with conventional landing gear.
Dragonfly Mk III
Version with tricycle landing gear.

== Specifications (Mark III Millenium) ==
Data from

General characteristics

- Crew: 1
- Capacity: 1 passenger
- Length: 19 ft 0 in (5.79 m)
- Wingspan: 22 ft 0 in (6.71 m)
- Height: 5 ft 6 in (1.68 m)
- Wing area: 92.1 sq ft (8.56 m^{2})
- Empty weight: 600 lb (272 kg)
- Gross weight: 1,250 lb (567 kg)
- Powerplant: 1 × Jabiru 2200 air-cooled flat-four

Performance

- Cruise speed: 130 mph (210 km/h, 110 kn)
- Stall speed: 55 mph (89 km/h, 48 kn)
- Never exceed speed: 180 mph (290 km/h, 160 kn)
- Range: 500 mi (800 km, 430 nmi)
- g limits: +4.4, -2.0
- Rate of climb: 850 ft/min (4.3 m/s)

== See also ==
Similar aircraft

- Rutan Quickie
- QAC Quickie Q2
