= Forbes & Arnold monoplane =

Experimental British aircraft

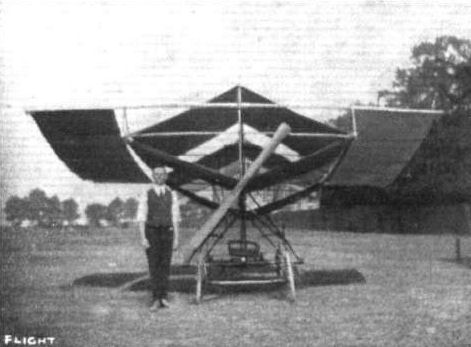

General information
- National origin: United Kingdom
- Manufacturer: Victor F. Forbes & Arthur J. Arnold
- Number built: 1

History
- Introduction date: 1911

The Forbes & Arnold monoplane was an experimental British aircraft dating to the early 1910s. It was constructed at Leigh-on-Sea, part of Southend-on-Sea in Essex.

== Design and development ==
The monoplane was designed and built by Victor F. Forbes and Arthur J. Arnold. According to a letter published in Flight magazine, their intent was to create an inherently stable, safe and low-cost flying machine that was easy to operate.

Their design was based on a box kite and they had conducted experiments with flying models, before moving onto constructing a full-sized piloted machine. The principles behind their design are detailed in the patent Improvements in Aerial Machines which the inventors had applied for in 1909, and which was granted in 1910.

Although referred to as a monoplane, the aircraft comprised eight separate wing components, these being made up of the upper and lower wing surfaces of the front and rear kite nacelles, two long outboard sail panels, and two independently adjustable elevons, located immediately behind the rear nacelle. Below the kite structure was a four-wheeled chassis, where a water-cooled engine was located, and behind that a pilot who sat on a wicker chair. A two-bladed tractor propeller positioned at the front of the kite structure was powered via a shaft and belt drive.

== Operational history ==
It's not clear when the monoplane was completed and tested. Photographs of the monoplane, published alongside the inventors' 1911 letter in Flight, show it without an engine. Aviation historians Michael Goodall & Albert Tagg wrote that the engine that had originally been fitted to the monoplane was low-powered and was replaced. The original propeller was also replaced with one of a different design. The historians also stated that the monoplane may have "lifted off briefly" when it had been tested at Rochford. Aviation historian Peter Lewis, however, noted that no flights were recorded. A Southend history website wrote that it "made a few hops but never actually flew."

== Specifications ==
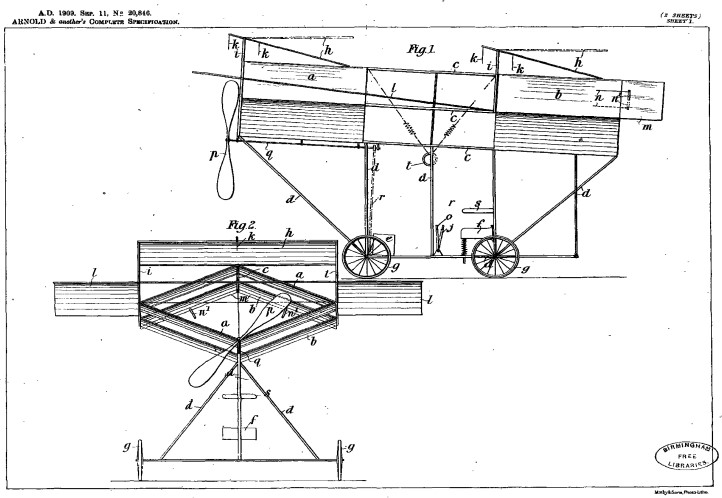
A drawing from 1909 GB patent 20,8046 – “Improvements in Aerial Machines”

Data from British Aircraft Before the Great War

General characteristics

- Capacity: 1
- Length: 24 ft (7.3 m)
- Width: 16 ft (4.9 m)
- Height: 10 ft (3.0 m)
- Wing area: 350 sq ft (33 m^{2})
- Gross weight: 450 lb (204 kg)

Performance

== See also ==
- Thompson Boxmoth, a 1970s aircraft of similar configuration
