= Terence Nonweiler =

British aeronautical engineer

Terence Nonweiler (8 February 1925 - 17 December 1999) held a Chair of Aeronautical Engineering at Glasgow University and later became Dean of the Faculty of Engineering. He has been credited with being the pioneer of wave-riding technology.

In January 1957 Nonweiler, and six other enthusiasts (including Beverley Shenstone) met at the College of Aeronautics, Cranfield and formed the Man-Powered Aircraft Committee (later to become the Man-Powered Aircraft Group of the RAeS) with the purposes of reviewing relevant literature, assessing its prospects, and promoting its realisation.

He also developed a family of airfoils, the best-known of which is the GU25-5(11)8 which was the subject of a wind tunnel test by F.H. Kelling in 1968. This airfoil was used as the canard wing section on the Quickie aircraft.

== Personal life ==
Nonweiler was born on 8 February 1925 in London. He married Patricia Hilda Frances (née Neame) in 1949 and they had four sons and one daughter. He died on 17 December 1999, aged 74, at his home in Raumati Beach, New Zealand.
