= Quander Airpfeil =

German ultralight trike

Airpfeil

General information
- Type: Ultralight trike
- National origin: Germany
- Manufacturer: Quander
- Status: In production (2014)

The Quander Airpfeil (English: Air-Arrow) is a German ultralight trike that was designed and produced by UL Flugzeugbau Quander of Petershagen. The aircraft is supplied complete and ready to fly.

== Design and development ==
The Airpfeil was designed to comply with the Fédération Aéronautique Internationale microlight category, including the category's maximum gross weight of 450 kg (992 lb). The aircraft has a maximum gross weight of 400 kg (882 lb). It features a cable-braced hang glider-style high wing, weight-shift controls, a two-seats-in-tandem open cockpit without a cockpit fairing, tricycle landing gear and a single engine in pusher configuration.

The aircraft is made from bolted-together aluminum tubing, with its double surface Vento 13 m^{2} (140 sq ft) wing covered in Dacron sailcloth. The 9.5 m (31.2 ft) span wing is supported by a single tube-type kingpost and uses an "A" frame weight-shift control bar. The wing is supported by a three-tube tetrahedral structure, which is no longer common on modern trikes, but provides good strength at light weight. The powerplant is a twin-cylinder, liquid-cooled, two-stroke, dual-ignition 50 hp (37 kW) Rotax 582 engine.

The aircraft has an empty weight of 130 kg (287 lb) and a gross weight of 400 kg (882 lb), giving a useful load of 270 kg (595 lb). With full fuel of 62 litres (14 imp gal; 16 US gal) the payload is 225 kg (496 lb).

== Specifications (Airpfeil with Vento 13 wing) ==
Data from Bayerl

General characteristics

- Crew: one
- Capacity: one passenger
- Wingspan: 9.5 m (31 ft 2 in)
- Wing area: 13 m^{2} (140 sq ft)
- Empty weight: 130 kg (287 lb)
- Gross weight: 400 kg (882 lb)
- Fuel capacity: 62 litres (14 imp gal; 16 US gal)
- Powerplant: 1 × Rotax 582 twin cylinder, liquid-cooled, two stroke aircraft engine, 48 kW (64 hp)
- Propellers: 3-bladed composite

Performance

- Maximum speed: 145 km/h (90 mph, 78 kn)
- Cruise speed: 120 km/h (75 mph, 65 kn)
- Stall speed: 50 km/h (31 mph, 27 kn)
- Rate of climb: 5.4 m/s (1,060 ft/min)
- Wing loading: 30.8 kg/m^{2} (6.3 lb/sq ft)
