= Revmaster R-2100D =

R-2100D
- Type: Horizontally opposed piston engine
- Manufacturer: Revmaster
- Designer: Joe Horvath
- Developed from: Volkswagen air-cooled engine

The Revmaster 2100D is a Volkswagen air-cooled engine modified for homebuilt aircraft with dual magneto ignition.

== Specifications (variant) ==
=== General characteristics ===
- Bore: 92
- Stroke: 78
- Displacement: 2073cc

=== Components ===
- Valvetrain: Single overhead exhaust valve, single side inlet valve per cylinder
- Fuel system: Single carburettor
- Cooling system: Air-cooled
- Tillotson Floatless Carburetor

=== Performance ===
- Power output: 65hp
