= Quickie Aircraft =

Defunct aircraft kit manufacturer

- Industry: Homebuilt Aircraft
- Founded: 1978; 48 years ago in Mojave, California, United States
- Founder: Gene Sheehan co-founder and designer; Tom Jewett co-founder and designer
- Defunct: 1986
- Fate: Bankrupt due to lawsuit
- Key people: Burt Rutan, Designer; Garry LeGare, Designer
- Products: Quickie; Quickie Q2; Quickie Q200; Quickie Aircraft Corporation Free Enterprise

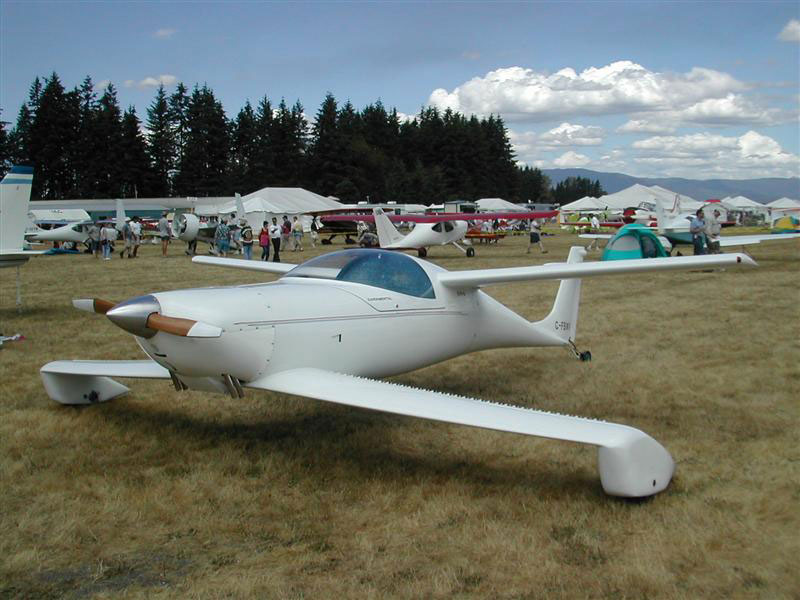
A Quickie Q2, with vortex generators on the canard.

The Quickie Aircraft Corporation was founded in Mojave, California, in 1978 to market the Quickie homebuilt aircraft (models Quickie, Quickie Q2, and Quickie Q200 aircraft). The original single-seater Quickie was designed by Burt Rutan and company founders Gene Sheehan and Tom Jewett. The two-seater Q2 and Q200 were designed by Canadian Garry LeGare, Jewett and Sheehan. While the Q2 and Q200 were based on the original Quickie, the design was completely different. Now defunct, the company sold over 2,000 kits in its lifetime.

The Quickie's canard wing used a GU25-5(11)8 airfoil, developed by Terence Nonweiler. It suffered performance degradation at low Reynolds numbers and in rainy conditions.

The QAC was sued and lost a legal battle due to the crash of a single place Quickie. The judgement was overturned by an appeals court, but the financial damage had been done. Then, partner Tom Jewett was killed in the crash of a different aircraft design. The Quickie Aircraft Corporation - leaderless and fiscally strapped - went bankrupt in 1986.

== Gallery ==
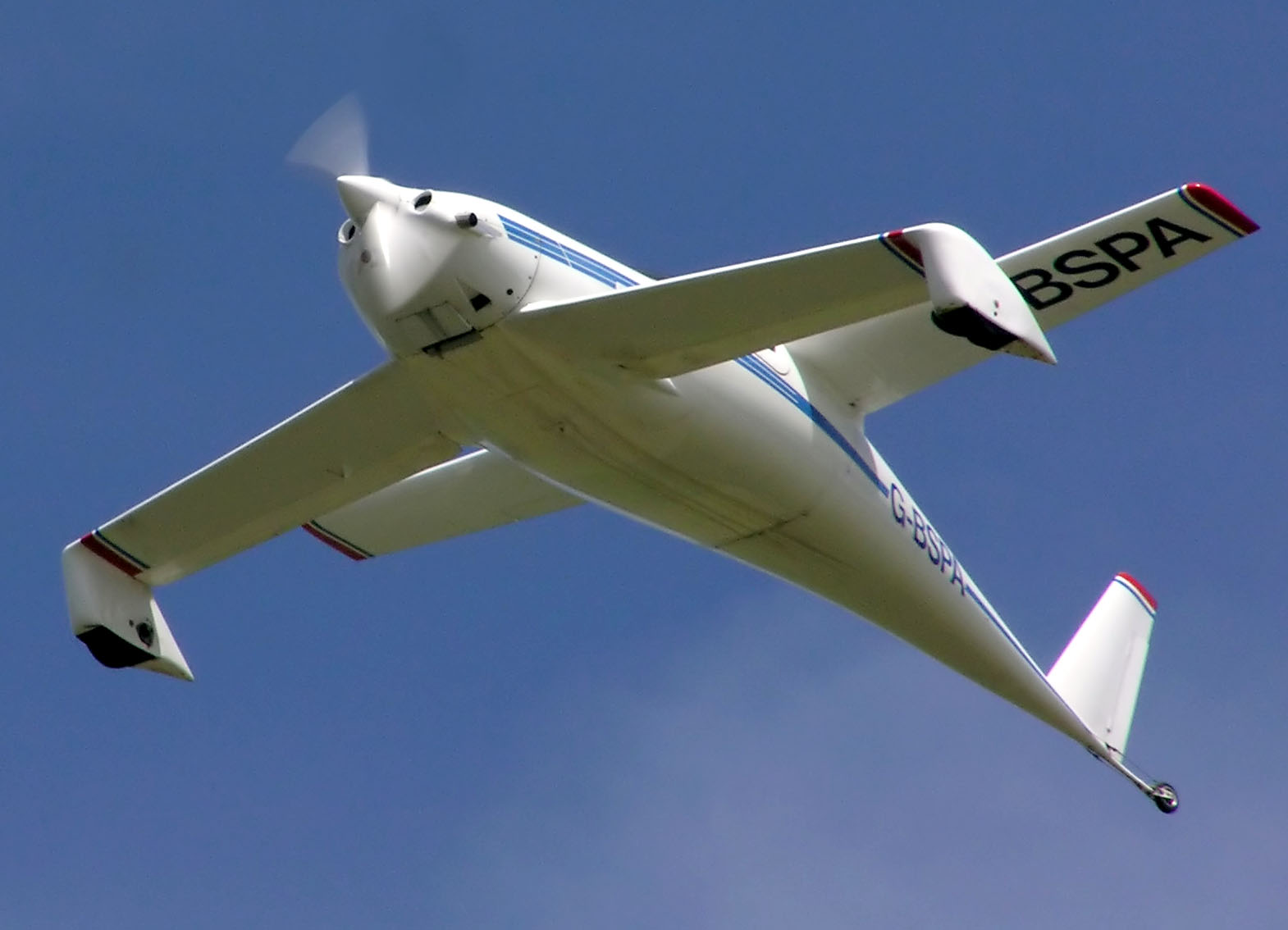
QAC Quickie Q2 in flight

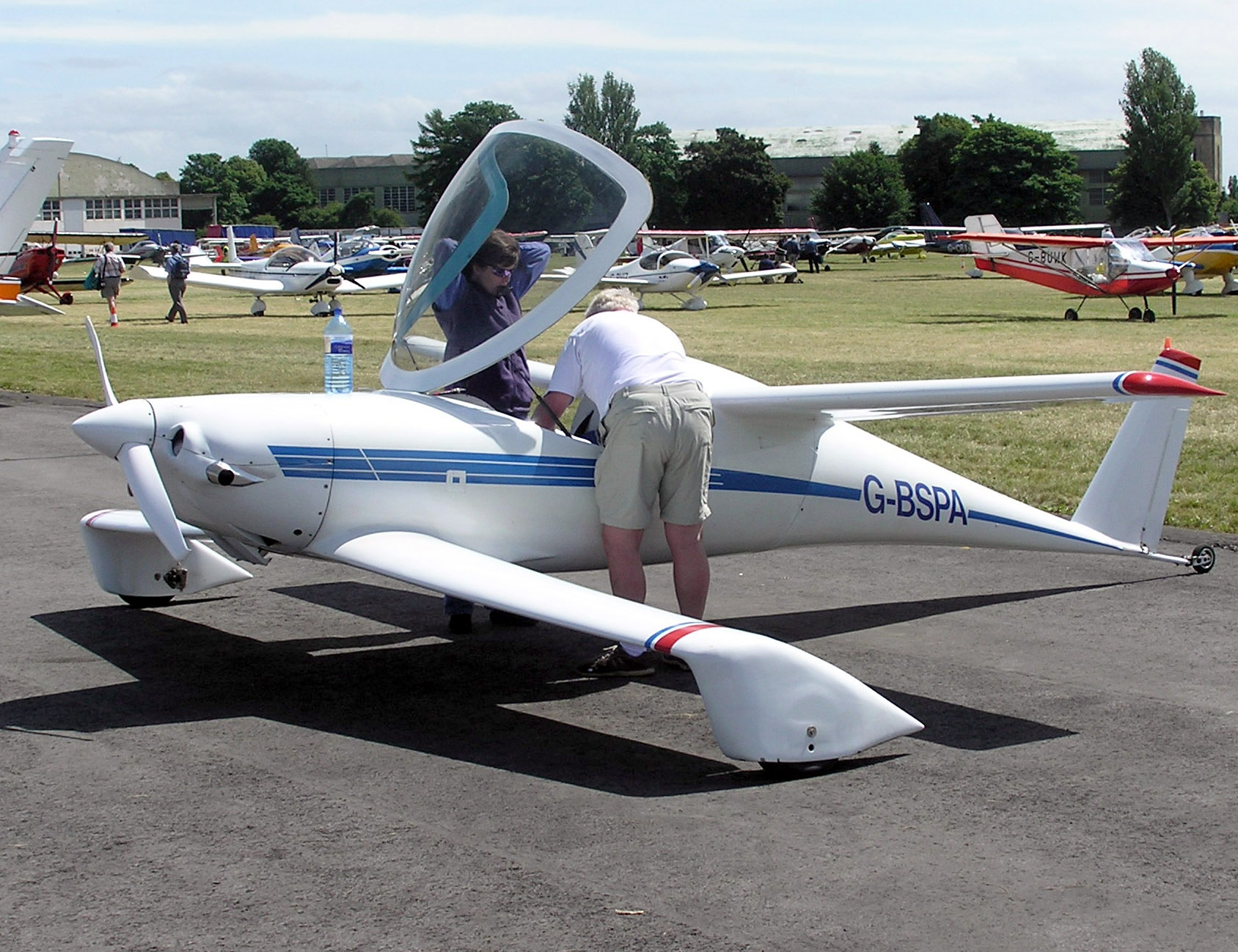
QAC Quickie Q2, canopy up

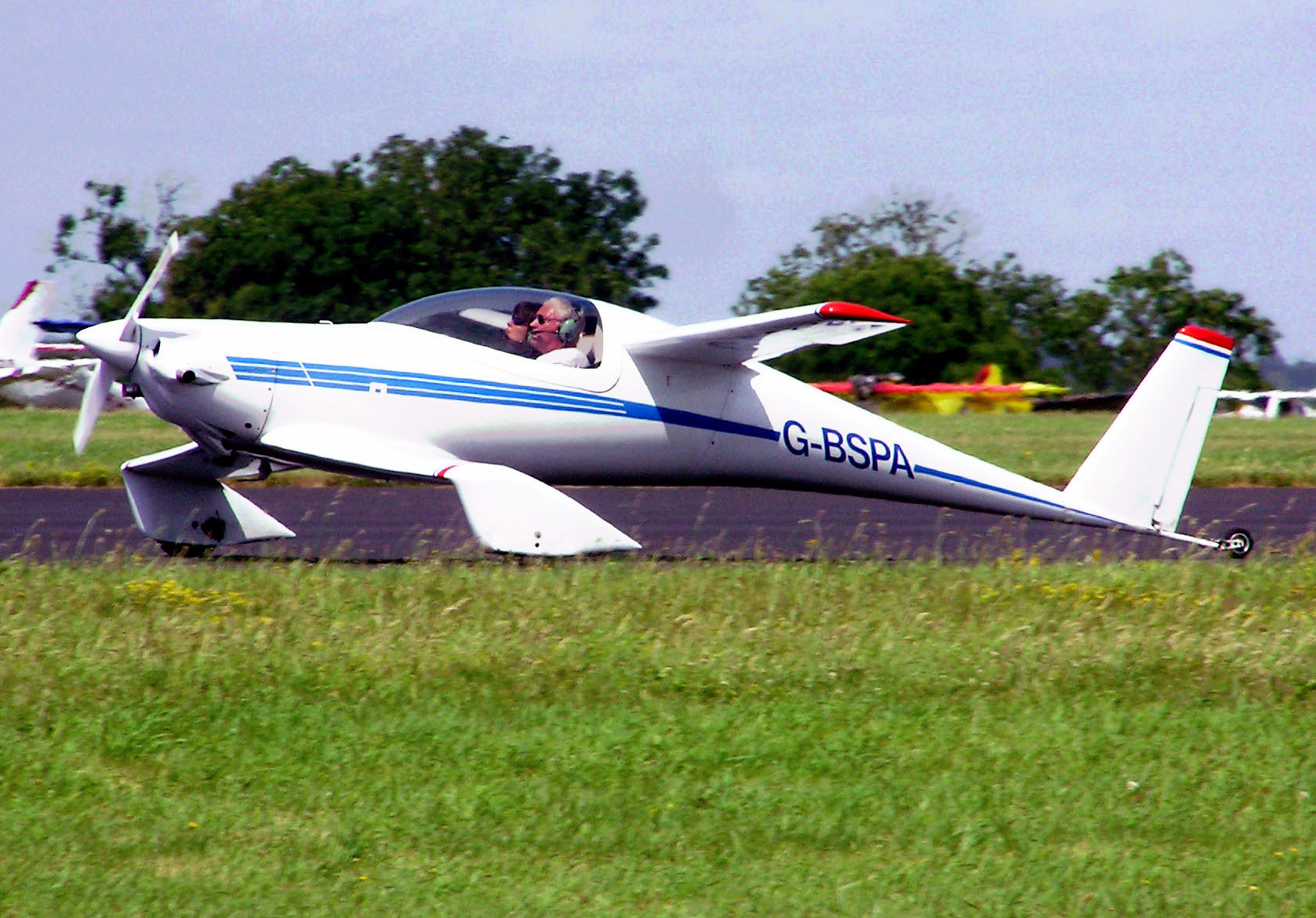
QAC Quickie Q2, side view

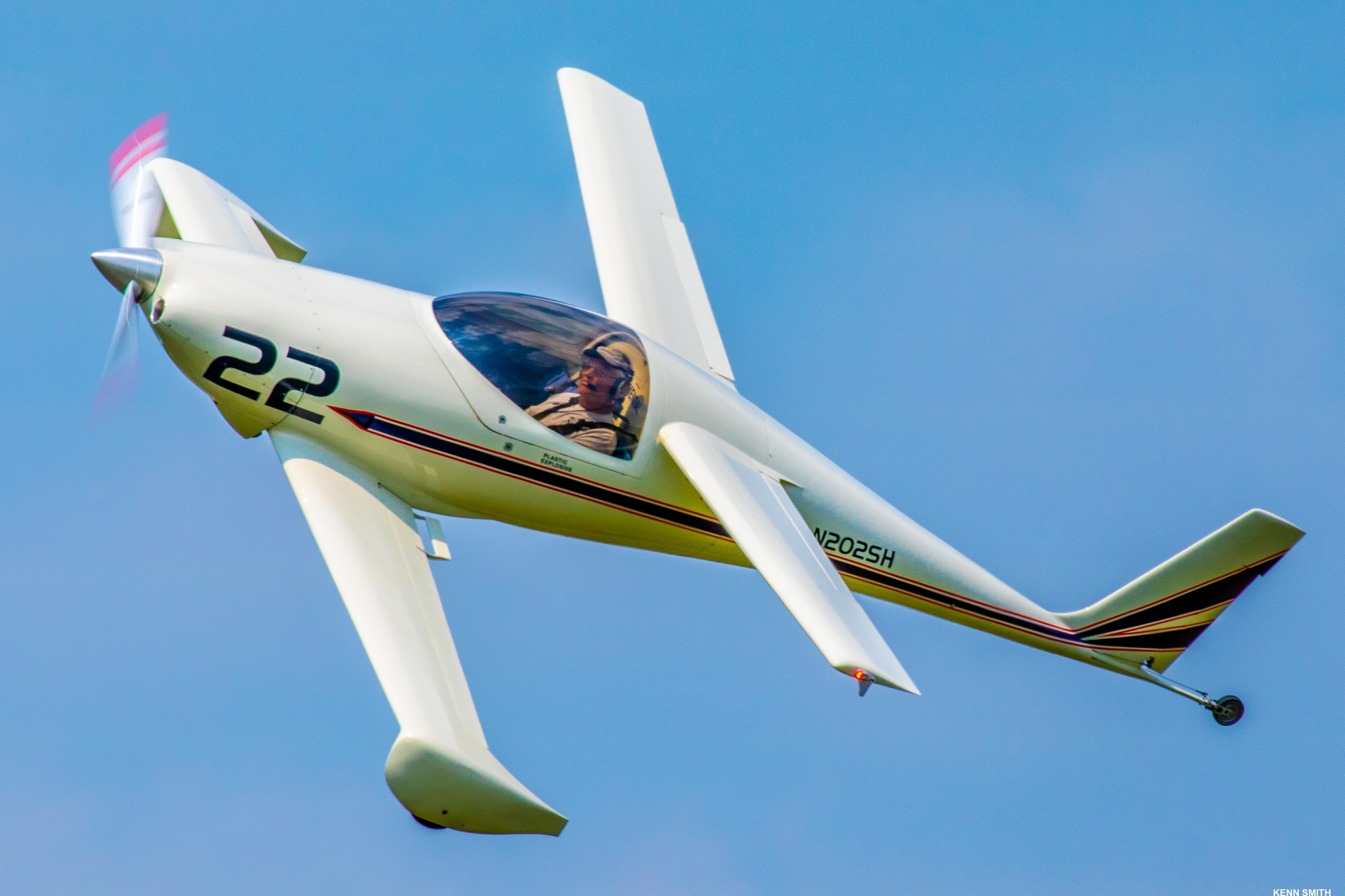
Opening turn in the 2023 Bluegrass 150 air race.
