= Viking SF-2A Cygnet =

American homebuilt aircraft design

SF-2A Cygnet
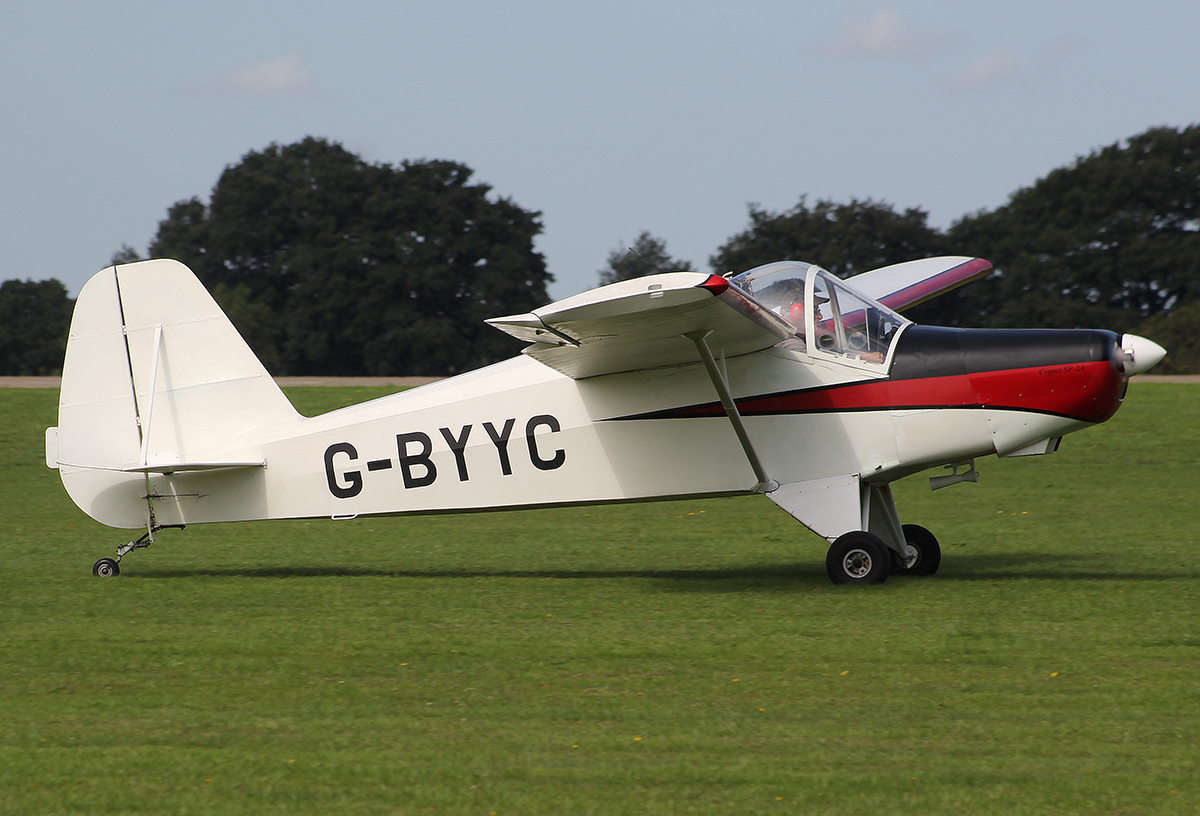

General information
- Type: Amateur-built aircraft
- National origin: United States
- Manufacturer: Viking Aircraft LLC
- Designer: Bert Sisler
- Status: Plans available (2003)
- Number built: 100 (2003)

History
- Introduction date: 1973
- First flight: 1973
- Developed from: Sisler SF-2 Whistler

The Viking SF-2A Cygnet, also called the Sisler SF-2A Cygnet and the HAPI SF-2A Cygnet, is an American STOL amateur-built aircraft, designed by Bert Sisler and produced by Viking Aircraft LLC. The aircraft is supplied in the form of plans for amateur construction. The Cygnet first flew in 1973.

The Cygnet plans were originally marketed by the designer through his company Sisler Aircraft of Bloomington, Minnesota and later by HAPI Engines, a supplier of Volkswagen air-cooled engines. By the 1990s Viking Aircraft of Elkhorn, Wisconsin took over supplying the aircraft plans.

== Design and development ==
The SF-2A Cygnet is a development of the earlier Sisler SF-2 Whistler introduced in 1973. The design features a strut-braced shoulder-wing, a two-seats-in-side-by-side configuration enclosed cockpit under a bubble canopy, fixed conventional landing gear and a single engine in tractor configuration.

The aircraft is made from wood, 4130 steel tubing and covered in doped aircraft fabric. Its 30 ft (9.1 m) span wing employs a NACA 3413 airfoil, has an area of 125 sq ft (11.6 m^{2}) and is supported by a single strut with a jury strut. The cockpit is 39 in (99 cm) wide and has a baggage compartment with a limit of 70 lb (32 kg), located behind the seats. The aircraft's recommended engine power range is 60 to 82 hp (45 to 61 kW) and standard engines used include the 82 hp (61 kW) Volkswagen four-stroke powerplant. Construction time from the supplied kit is estimated as 1700–1800 hours.

The Cygnet won a design award at the EAA Annual Convention and Fly-In in 1973.

== Operational history ==
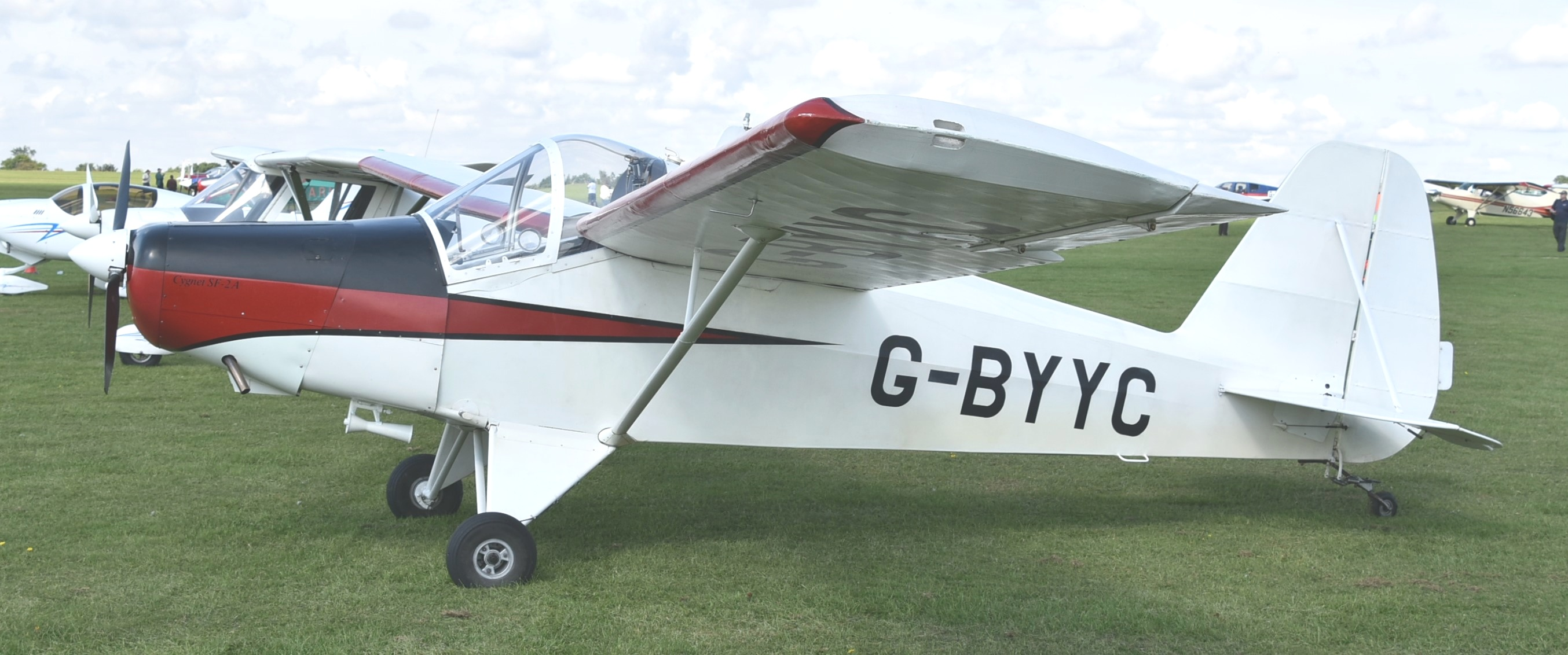
SF-2A Cygnet

By January 2003, 100 examples had been reported as completed and flown.

In July 2016 a total of 19 SF-2A Cygnets were registered in the United States with the Federal Aviation Administration, four with Transport Canada and seven with the Civil Aviation Authority in the United Kingdom.

In a 2020 review, AVweb writer Paul Dye concluded, "Flying a piece of history (and with a forward swept wing, something fairly unique!) is always fun. Just like all strange meat gets described as "tasting like chicken", it is easy to describe airplanes like this as flying "like a Cub"—and it’s true, in the sense that it is well-mannered and easy to steer around the sky. Yes, that visibility at the start of a turn is going to take a little getting used to, as is the landing attitude. But if you take the time to get it figured out, the Cygnet is a nice little airplane with a Midwest tradition. Honest, straightforward, and enjoyable.".

== Specifications (SF-2A Cygnet) ==
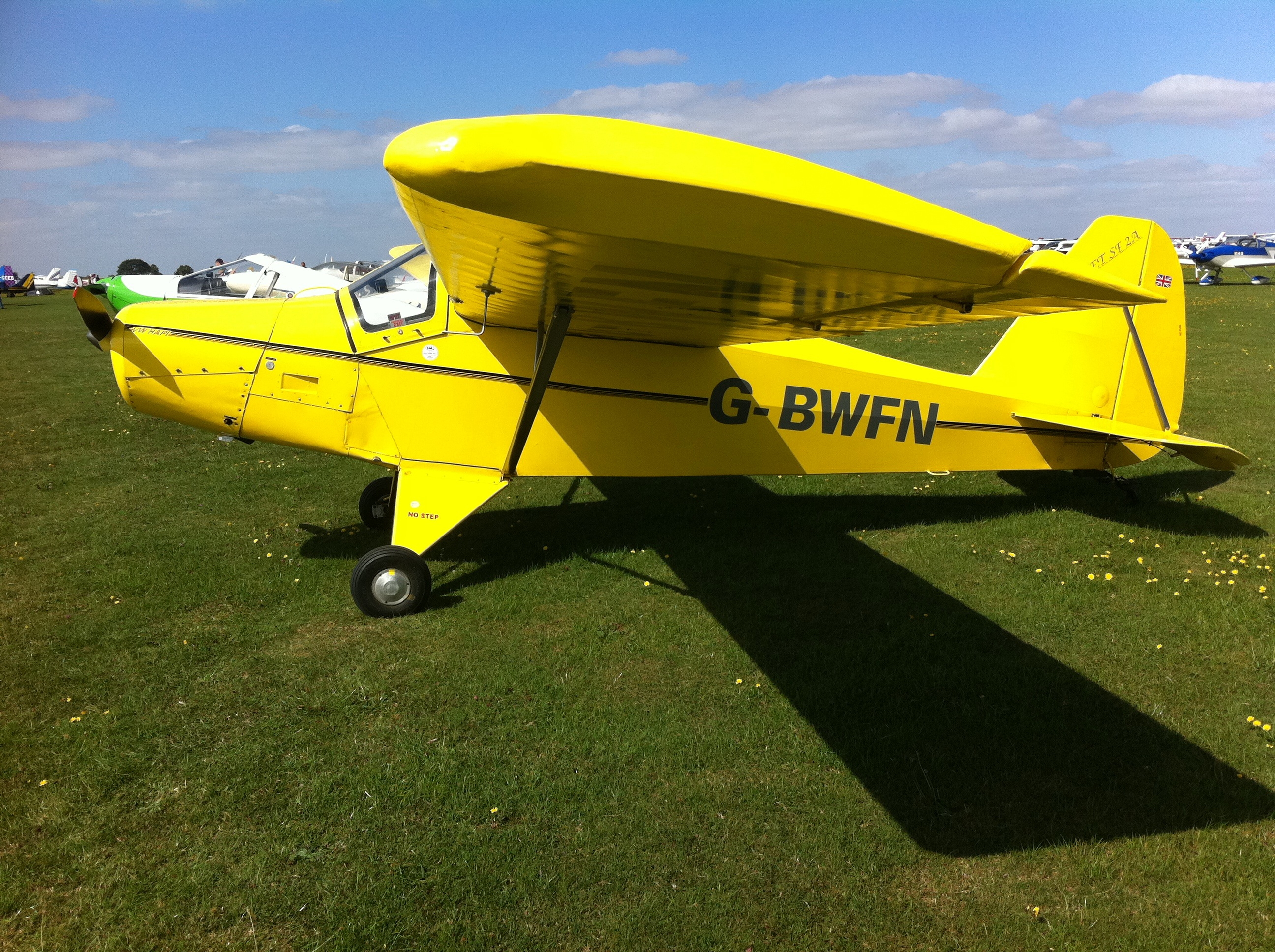
SF-2A Cygnet

Data from Kitplanes and Purdy

General characteristics

- Crew: one
- Capacity: one passenger
- Length: 19 ft (5.8 m)
- Wingspan: 30 ft (9.1 m)
- Height: 5.8 ft (1.8 m)
- Wing area: 125 sq ft (11.6 m^{2})
- Airfoil: NACA 3413
- Empty weight: 585 lb (265 kg)
- Gross weight: 1,100 lb (499 kg)
- Fuel capacity: 15 U.S. gallons (57 L; 12 imp gal)
- Powerplant: 1 × Volkswagen air-cooled engine four cylinder, 1835 cc, four stroke automotive conversion, 82 hp (61 kW)

Performance

- Maximum speed: 108 mph (174 km/h, 94 kn)
- Cruise speed: 100 mph (160 km/h, 87 kn)
- Stall speed: 48 mph (77 km/h, 42 kn)
- Range: 390 mi (630 km, 340 nmi)
- Rate of climb: 580 ft/min (2.9 m/s)
