= AMSOIL Racer =

Type of aircraft

Model 68 AMSOIL Racer
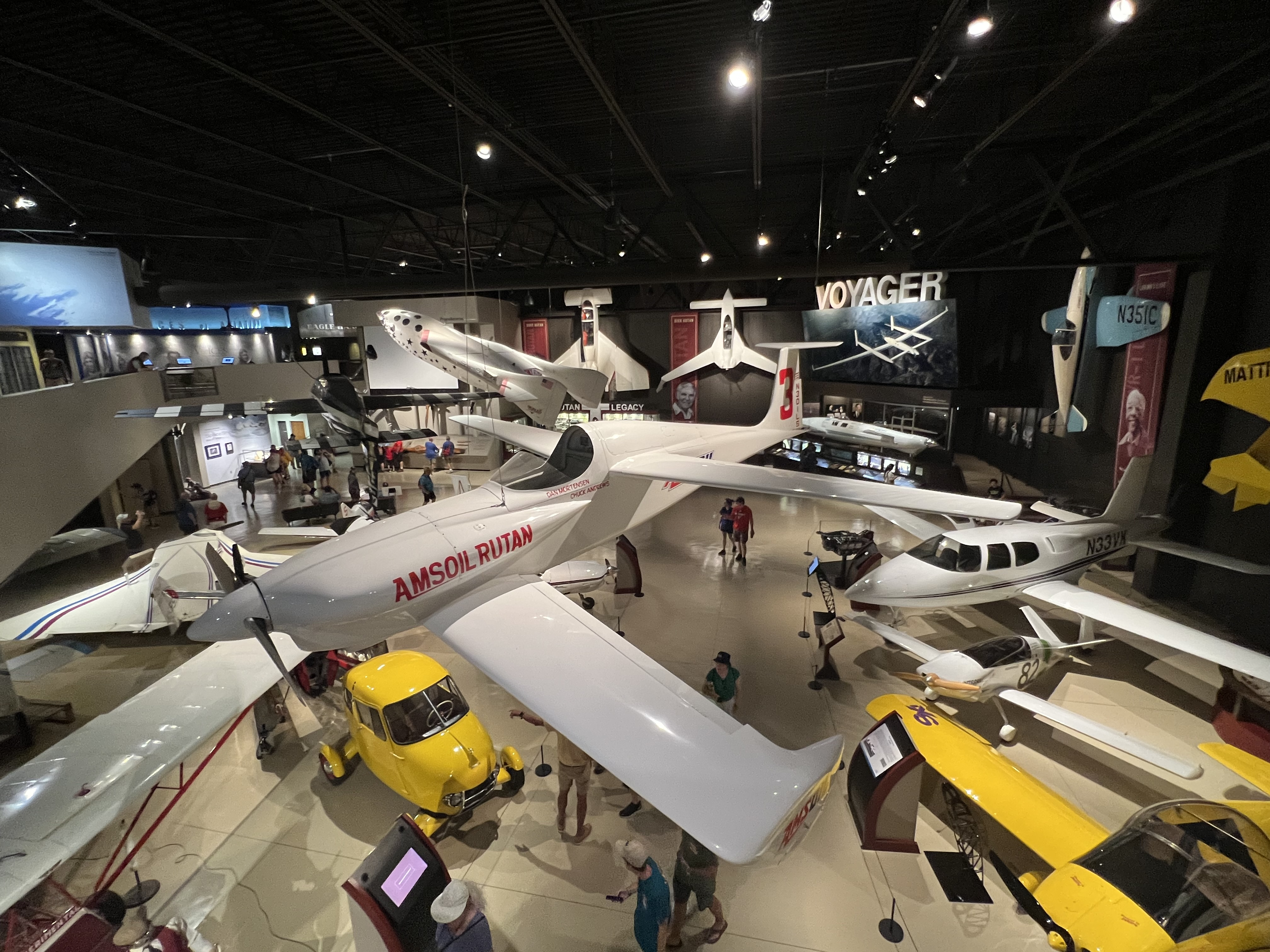
- AMSOIL Racer at the EAA Aviation Museum

General information
- Type: Air racer
- National origin: United States
- Manufacturer: Rutan Aircraft Factory
- Designer: Burt Rutan
- Number built: 1

History
- First flight: Summer 1981

The AMSOIL Racer, also known as the Rutan Biplane Racer and the Rutan Model 68 Racer, is a race tandem wing plane which was designed by Burt Rutan's Rutan Aircraft Factory, and built and flown by Dan Mortensen. It set several speed records, but crashed at the 1983 Reno Air Races.

== Conception and construction ==
The concept which led to the AMSOIL Racer began in 1979 when race pilot Dan Mortensen approached Burt Rutan about designing an aircraft that would beat the Beck-Mahoney Sorceress, owned by Don Beck and which was dominating the competition at the time. After some research and calculations, Rutan produced three preliminary designs, and the least radical of these was chosen. Like the Model 54 Quickie tandem wing that he had previously designed, the Model 68 (as Rutan designated it) was configured with a canard wing, a main wing and, unlike the Quickie, had additional horizontal flight surface in the form of a T-tail. Rutan sold rights and plans to build two aircraft of the design to Mortensen for $6,000.

The construction began in January, 1981, in Sacramento, California, first in a garage and then in a hangar. During the construction phase, Amsoil signed on as a sponsor, in order to promote its new synthetic aviation motor oils. The plane was built from fiberglass, kevlar and graphite composites. First flight took place that summer, but the aircraft was damaged by heat from the engine's exhaust. After it was rebuilt, it was entered in the 1981 Reno Air Races.

== Racing and records ==
At the 1981 Reno Air Races, the AMSOIL Racer, with Mortensen as pilot, finished third, after being assessed a penalty for cutting home pylon (due to the need to avoid a collision with the racer Sundancer). Due to roll control problems, Mortensen took the plane to Rutan's home base at the Mojave Airport for further design analysis and flight testing by Rutan Aircraft Factory pilots Mike Melvill and Dick Rutan. The aileron control system design was subsequently modified.

At the 1982 Reno Air Races, Mortesen and the AMSOIL Racer took second place, with an average race speed of 209.21 mph (336.69 km/h), just 0.3 seconds behind the winner, again Sundancer.

Mortesen then set out to break speed records. The first was the Class C.1.b (1,000-2,000 pound takeoff weight) 3 km closed course, which the AMSOIL Racer beat with a speed of 232 mph (373 km/h). The second record achieved was over a 75-mile (121 km) closed course, which was accomplished with a speed of 235 mph (378 km/h).

At the 1983 Reno Air Races, during one of the early heat races, Mortensen had to manoeuvre in order to avoid a mid-air collision with Sorceress, ending up entering that plane's wake turbulence only 35 feet (11 m) off the ground. With so little altitude to recover, the AMSOIL Racer hit the ground at over 200 mph (320 km/h), tumbling. The plane was completely destroyed, but since Rutan had designed the cockpit to withstand a 22g impact, Mortensen survived with only minor injuries.

The aircraft was rebuilt for static display, and was suspended over the Pylon Bar in the Reno Hilton (now the Grand Sierra Resort) in Reno, Nevada, for many years. It now resides in the EAA Museum at Oshkosh, WI. The second aircraft that was licensed by Rutan was never built.

== Specifications ==
General characteristics

- Crew: 1
- Capacity: 1
- Length: 22 ft (6.7 m)
- Upper wingspan: 22 ft 6 in (6.86 m) Aft Wing
- Lower wingspan: 17 ft 9.6 in (5.425 m) Front Wing
- Wing area: 91.7 sq ft (8.52 m^{2}) (Front 47.6) + (Aft 44.1)
- Aspect ratio: 6.68 & 11.48
- Gross weight: 1,200 lb (544 kg) Aerobatic Weight
- Max takeoff weight: 1,126 lb (511 kg)
- Powerplant: 1 × Lycoming O-320 , 160 hp (120 kW)

Performance

- Maximum speed: 204 kn (235 mph, 378 km/h)
- Wing loading: 13.08 lb/sq ft (63.9 kg/m^{2})
- Power/mass: 0.1333333
