= Quikkit Glass Goose =

Two-seat biplane amphibious kit aircraft

Glass Goose
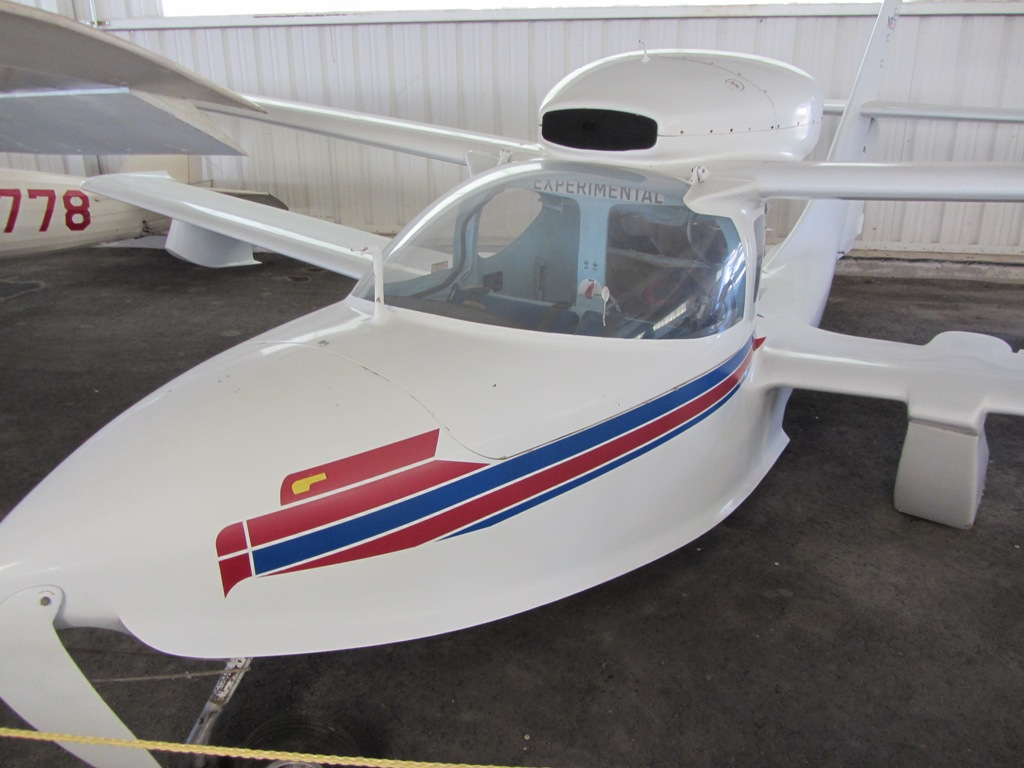
- Aero Gare Seahawk

General information
- Type: Amateur-built aircraft
- National origin: United States
- Manufacturer: Quikkit
- Designer: Tom Scott
- Status: Production completed (2013)

History
- Introduction date: 1982

The Quikkit Glass Goose is an American two-seat biplane amphibious aircraft, designed by Tom Scott and marketed for homebuilding by Quikkit of Dallas, Texas.

The Glass Goose is based on the earlier Sea Hawker, which was designed by Garry LeGare in 1982 and sold through his firm Aero Gare as the Sea Hawk and, later, Sea Hawker. LeGare sold the rights to the aircraft to Aero Composites in 1986, which sold them again two years later to (unrelated) Aero Composite Technologies.

== Design and development ==
Tom Scott purchased a Sea Hawker kit in October 1984 and completed the aircraft in March 1986, constructing the aircraft according to the plans. He was not happy with the resulting aircraft and over five years incorporated improvements to address performance and stability shortcomings. The final design has more wing area, a larger hull surface and improved pylon aerodynamics, plus many other improvements. This redesign became the Glass Goose kit.

The Glass Goose features a cantilever biplane layout, without interplane struts, a two-seats-in-side-by-side configuration enclosed cockpit under a bubble canopy, retractable tricycle landing gear and a single engine in pusher configuration.

The aircraft is made from composites. Its 27 ft (8.2 m) span wing has an area of 12 m^{2} (130 sq ft). Standard engines used are 160 to 185 hp (119 to 138 kW) Lycomings, although the eight-cylinder 180 hp (134 kW) Jabiru 5100 and Mazda Wankel engines have also been employed.

In 2013, Kitplanes Magazine reported that they could not reach the Quikkit Division of Rainbow Flyers, Inc., the Glass Goose kit manufacturer, so they considered the design unavailable.

== Specifications (Glass Goose) ==
Data from Bayerl and Tacke

General characteristics

- Crew: one
- Capacity: one passenger
- Wingspan: 27 ft 0 in (8.23 m)
- Wing area: 130 sq ft (12 m^{2})
- Empty weight: 899 lb (408 kg)
- Gross weight: 1,799 lb (816 kg)
- Fuel capacity: 70 U.S. gallons (260 L; 58 imp gal)
- Powerplant: 1 × Lycoming O-320 four cylinder, air-cooled, four stroke aircraft engine, 160 hp (120 kW)

Performance

- Maximum speed: 160 mph (257 km/h, 139 kn)
- Cruise speed: 140 mph (225 km/h, 121 kn)
- Stall speed: 42 mph (68 km/h, 37 kn)
- Rate of climb: 1,200 ft/min (6 m/s)
- Wing loading: 14 lb/sq ft (68 kg/m^{2})
