= Quander =

German aircraft manufacturer

UL Flugzeugbau Quander
- Company type: Privately held company
- Industry: Aerospace
- Headquarters: Germany
- Products: Ultralight trikes Powered parachutes
- Website: ul-flugzeugbau-quander.de

UL Flugzeugbau Quander (English: Quander Ultralight Aircraft) is a German aircraft manufacturer based in Petershagen. The company specializes in the design and manufacture of ultralight trikes and powered parachutes.

== Aircraft ==
Summary of aircraft built by Quander
| Model name | First flight | Number built | Type |
|---|---|---|---|
| Quander Airpfeil | | | ultralight trike |
| Quander Micropfeil | | | ultralight trike |
| Quander Grasshopper | | | powered parachute |
| Quander Grasshopper Duo | | | powered parachute |
| Quander Parapfeil | | | powered parachute |
