= Quander Micropfeil =

German ultralight trike

Micropfeil

General information
- Type: Ultralight trike
- National origin: Germany
- Manufacturer: Quander
- Status: In production (2014)

The Quander Micropfeil (English: Small Arrow) is a German ultralight trike that was designed and is produced by UL Flugzeugbau Quander of Petershagen. The aircraft is supplied complete and ready to fly.

== Design and development ==
The Micropfeil was designed to comply with the Fédération Aéronautique Internationale microlight category and the US FAR 103 Ultralight Vehicles rules. It features a cable-braced hang glider-style high wing, weight-shift controls, a single-seat open cockpit without a cockpit fairing, tricycle landing gear and a single engine in pusher configuration.

The aircraft is made from bolted-together aluminum tubing, with its double surface Schönleber Speed 14 m^{2} (150 sq ft) wing covered in Dacron sailcloth. The 10.8 m (35.4 ft) span wing is supported by a single tube-type kingpost and uses an "A" frame weight-shift control bar. The wing is supported by a two-tube structure. The powerplant is a twin-cylinder, air-cooled, two-stroke, single-ignition 40 hp (30 kW) Rotax 447 engine.

The aircraft has an empty weight of 80 kg (176 lb) and a gross weight of 300 kg (661 lb), giving a useful load of 220 kg (485 lb). With full fuel of 25 litres (5.5 imp gal; 6.6 US gal) the payload is 206 kg (454 lb).

== Specifications (Micropfeil with Schönleber Speed wing) ==
Data from Bayerl

General characteristics

- Crew: one
- Wingspan: 10.8 m (35 ft 5 in)
- Wing area: 14 m^{2} (150 sq ft)
- Empty weight: 80 kg (176 lb)
- Gross weight: 300 kg (661 lb)
- Fuel capacity: 25 litres (5.5 imp gal; 6.6 US gal)
- Powerplant: 1 × Rotax 447 twin cylinder, air-cooled, two stroke aircraft engine, 30 kW (40 hp)
- Propellers: 4-bladed composite

Performance

- Maximum speed: 120 km/h (75 mph, 65 kn)
- Cruise speed: 90 km/h (56 mph, 49 kn)
- Stall speed: 42 km/h (26 mph, 23 kn)
- Rate of climb: 4.5 m/s (890 ft/min)
- Wing loading: 21.4 kg/m^{2} (4.4 lb/sq ft)
