= Quasar (Czech company) =

Czech aircraft manufacturer

- Type: Privately held company
- Industry: Aerospace
- Founder: Karel Haman
- Headquarters: Dolní Bečva, Czech Republic
- Products: Hang gliders
- Website: www.hanggliding.cz

Quasar is a Czech aircraft manufacturer based in Dolní Bečva and founded by Karel Haman. The company specializes in the design and manufacture of hang gliders in the form of ready-to-fly aircraft, plus ultralight trike wings.

The company produces a wide range of hang glider wings that has included beginner wings, like the Quasar Tramp, intermediate wings, such as the Quasar 2000 and the Quasar Flavio that was designed by world hang gliding champion Tomáš Suchánek plus the competition topless Quasar Relief wing design.

== Aircraft ==
Summary of aircraft built by Quasar
Model name	First flight	Number built	Type
Quasar 2000	mid-2000s		Intermediate hang glider
Quasar Flavio	mid-2000s		Intermediate hang glider
Quasar Relief	mid-2000s		Competition hang glider
Quasar Relief STRX	2010s		Ultralight trike wing
Quasar Tramp	mid-2000s		Beginner hang glider
