= Quikkit =

Manufacturer of kitplanes

- Company type: Kitplanes
- Founded: 1992; 34 years ago
- Founder: Tom Scott
- Defunct: August 2021
- Headquarters: Dallas, Texas, United States
- Products: Glass Goose amphibious aircraft
- Parent: Rainbow Flyers, Inc. Dallas, Texas
- Website: Archived 2006-01-18 at the Wayback Machine

Quikkit was a manufacturer of kitplanes located in Dallas, Texas. The firm was founded in 1992 by Tom Scott to market the Glass Goose amphibious aircraft, a substantially revised version of the Aero Composites Sea Hawker design that Scott purchased the rights to after the previous manufacturer ceased business.
