= Quickie Free Enterprise =

American experimental aircraft

Free Enterprise

General information
- Type: Experimental long-range aircraft
- National origin: United States of America
- Manufacturer: Quickie Aircraft Corporation
- Number built: 1

History
- First flight: 1982

The Quickie Aircraft Corporation Free Enterprise (also known as the Big Bird) was an American experimental long-range aircraft of the 1980s, designed to attempt the first unrefuelled flight round-the world flight. The Free Enterprise was a single-engined high-winged monoplane of conventional configuration. It first flew in March 1982, but was destroyed in a fatal crash later that year.

== Design and development ==
In late 1979, Gene Sheehan and Tom Jewett, co-founders of the Quickie Aircraft Corporation, builders of the successful Quickie tandem-winged kitplane, started development of an aircraft to attempt to make the first unrefuelled round-the-world flight. This would require a flight of at least 22,800 miles (36,700 km), almost double the existing unrefuelled flight distance record of 12,532 miles (20,176 km) set by a Boeing B-52 Stratofortress bomber in January 1962.

While Quickie Aircraft had made their name with the tandem-winged Quickie, their design for the round-the-world flight which was initially known as the "Big Bird", but later was named "Free Enterprise", was a more conventional single-engined high-winged monoplane of tractor configuration. Its high-aspect ratio all-metal wings were based on those of the Laister Nugget sailplane, while the slender fuselage and empennage were of Kevlar/fiberglass/Urethane foam composite construction. The aircraft took off using a tricycle trolley which would then be jettisoned, the aircraft landing on a ventral skid. Two large fuel tanks were mounted in the fuselage which, together with tip-tanks on the end of the wings, held 365 US Gallons (1,382 litres) of fuel. It was powered by a 135 hp (100 kW) PZL-Franklin air-cooled flat-six piston engine, chosen for its superior fuel economy. The pilot sat in an enclosed cockpit under a bubble canopy.

The plan was for Jewett to make the flight at high-altitude, to take advantage of jetstream winds, with an average 50 knot tailwind expected. He was to carry out the flight on oxygen, using an autopilot to allow some sleep during the record flight, which was estimated to take about 80 hours. Sophisticated radio navigation gear was fitted to pinpoint the aircraft's position and to warn Jewett if it drifted off-course. The flight was planned to start and finish at Houston Intercontinental Airport, Texas, flying eastwards over the Atlantic and Mediterranean, then using the jetstreams over China and the Pacific Ocean.

== Operational history ==
The Free Enterprise made its first public test flight on 8 March 1982, with the record flight scheduled for autumn to take advantage of stronger prevailing winds. It crashed, however, on 2 July 1982 while carrying out a test-flight near Mojave, California, killing Jewett.

== Specifications ==
Data from Jane's All The World's Aircraft 1982–83

General characteristics

- Crew: 1
- Length: 24 ft 8 in (7.52 m)
- Wingspan: 51 ft 6 in (15.70 m)
- Empty weight: 1,700 lb (771 kg)
- Max takeoff weight: 4,250 lb (1,928 kg)
- Fuel capacity: 365 US Gallons (1,382 L)
- Powerplant: 1 × PZL-Franklin PZL-F 4A-235 air-cooled turbocharged flat-four piston engine, 135 hp (101 kW)

Performance

- Cruise speed: 200 mph (320 km/h, 170 kn)
- Stall speed: 61 mph (98 km/h, 53 kn) (full flaps)
- Range: 24,500 mi (39,400 km, 21,300 nmi)
- Cruise altitude: 20,000–30,000 ft (6,100–9,150 m)

== See also ==
Aircraft of comparable role, configuration, and era

- Bede BD-2
- Rutan Voyager
- Virgin Atlantic GlobalFlyer
