= Rutan Quickie =

Light aircraft designed by Burt Rutan

Quickie Q1
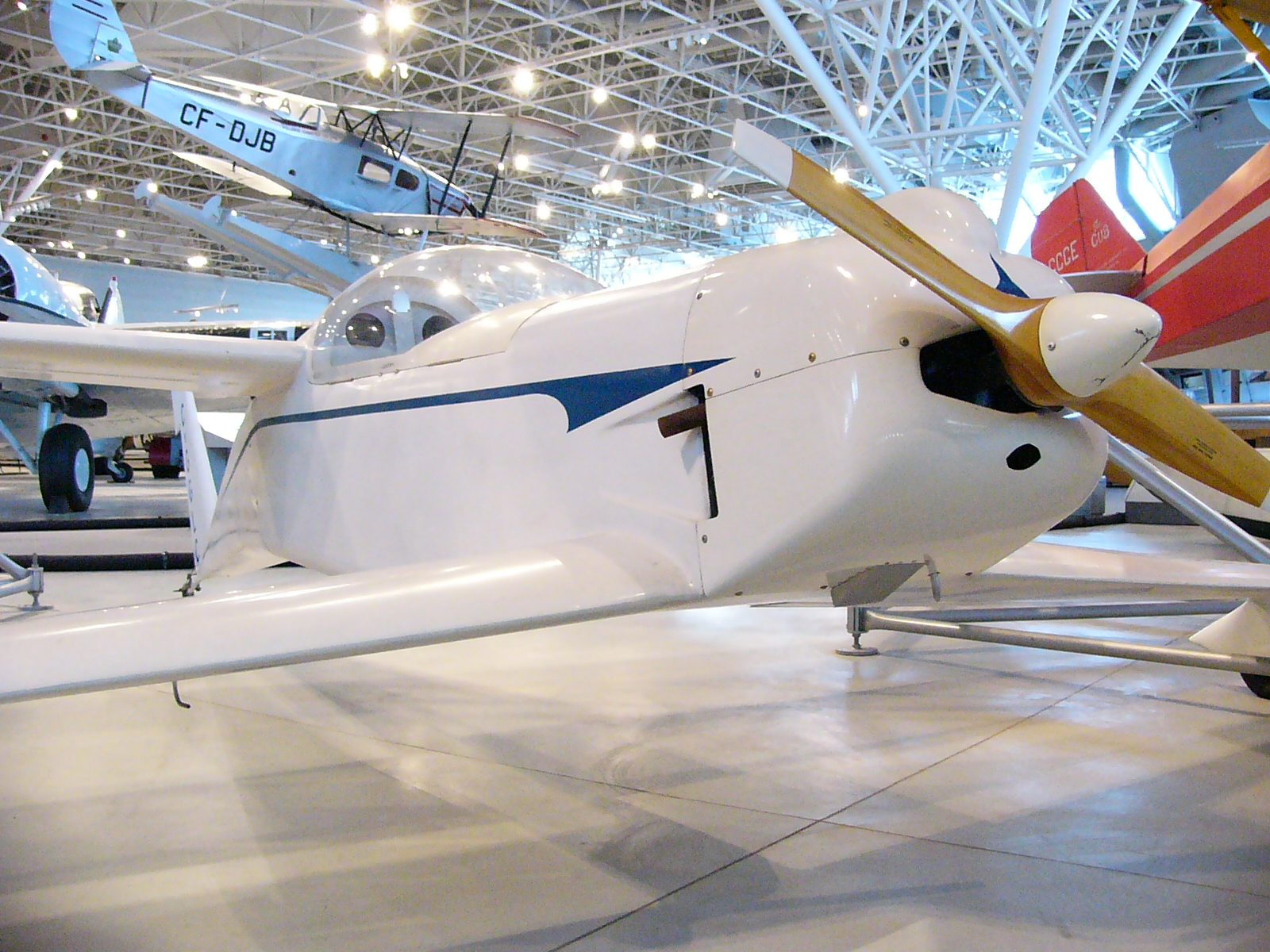
- Quickie in the Canada Aviation and Space Museum.

General information
- Type: Single seat aircraft
- Manufacturer: Rutan Aircraft Factory (prototype); Quickie Aircraft (production)
- Designer: Burt Rutan, Tom Jewett, Gene Sheehan
- Status: kit production ended
- Number built: 350+

History
- First flight: November 1977
- Variants: QAC Quickie Q2; Viking Dragonfly

The Rutan Model 54 Quickie is a lightweight single-seat taildragger aircraft of composite construction, configured with tandem wings.

The Quickie was primarily designed by Burt Rutan as a low-powered, highly efficient kit-plane. Its tandem wing design has one anhedral forward wing and one slightly larger dihedral rear wing. The forward wing has full-span control surfaces and is thus similar to a canard wing, but is considerably larger. The aircraft has unusual landing gear, with the main wheels located at the tips of the forward wing.

== Design and development ==
The Quickie Aircraft Corporation was formed to produce and market the Quickie in kit form after 1978. Two years later a two-seater variant of the same layout followed as the Q2. The original Quickie (Model 54 in Rutan's design series) is one of several unconventional aircraft penned by Rutan for the general aviation market.

The Quickie followed from Jewett and Sheehan's intention in 1975 for a low-cost, low-power, single-seat homebuilt aircraft. The first element to be found by Jewett and Sheehan was the engine, which – although low-powered (they had anticipated 12 hp) – had to be reliable for aviation work. With the help of Onan, a manufacturer of industrial four-stroke engines, they were able to procure a 70 lb (32 kg) engine that would deliver 18 hp (14 kW) at 3,600 rpm.

Rutan was then involved with the design; Sheehan and Jewett suggesting a scaled-down Vari-Eze. After a preliminary pusher canard configuration design (Rutan Model 49) had been discarded, his solution to the design issues of low drag without retractable undercarriage and a workable center of gravity travel, was a tractor engine/tandem wing layout. Conversely to canard layout, the conventional front engine location put the pilot close to the center of gravity, a key point for a light aircraft. The wheels were incorporated into wingtip fairings without much drag penalty and the tandem layout gave safe stalling characteristics. Rutan produced the first drawings in May 1977 and thereafter the three of them worked on the design drawings over the next two months with construction beginning in August. After the first flights, Rutan spent more time with his Defiant design and other projects, and it was Jewett and Sheehan who continued development of the design and market it for home-build use. An agreement was reached that Rutan would fund the development and testing and once the design was complete they would pay Rutan back from future sales of the designs and kits.

=== Configuration ===
The Quickie is a tandem wing taildragger, having one forward wing and one rear wing (instead of the more usual main wing and tailplane). According to Rutan this layout was not new, having previously been used in aircraft such as the Mignet "Flying Flea".

As with other Rutan designs, the Quickie is constructed of glass fibre and resin over a foam core. The wings are foam blanks cut to shape with a hot wire before covering, and the fuselage made up of 1 inch-thick (25.4 mm) foam slabs.

The forward wing provides around 60% of the lift. The full-span control surfaces on the forward wing serve as combined elevators and flaps. Ailerons are located inboard on the rear wing which is shoulder-mounted just aft of the pilot. The tandem layout provides positive lift from both pairs of wings; whereas on a conventional aircraft, the tailplane mostly provides negative lift.

The Quickie has fixed (non-retractable) main wheels faired into spats located at the tips of the forward wing. The absence of separate landing gear helps to reduce both weight and drag, such savings allowing a smaller engine and a smaller fuel tank. Even though the propeller is of small diameter, propeller clearance remains limited and the Quickie is rather vulnerable to ground strikes.

Pilot controls include a side-stick on the right and a throttle on the left. Rudder pedals are linked to the steerable tailwheel. The rather crude cable-operated brake comprises a cockpit lever operating steel tire-scrubbers on each main wheel.

=== Construction and flight tests ===
Construction of the prototype commenced in August 1977 at the Rutan Aircraft Factory; Gene did the majority of the construction work and the prototype was completed in about 400 hours. The prototype Quickie registered "N77Q" (77 for 1977, Q for Quickie.) started its flight test program in November 1977. All three of the designers flew it on the first day. The prototype was modified during its test program. The span of both the canard and main wing were increased to improve lifting ability. These reduced stall speed and shortened takeoff and landing distances; its attitude on the ground was also adjusted for optimal takeoff and landing. Originally designed with a fixed fin and only the faired tailwheel acting as the rudder, a conventional rudder was substituted. The steerable tailwheel allows directional control up to the point of liftoff, as the Quickie does not lift its tail during the takeoff run. Although it takes off at around 55 mph and its maximum speed of 126 mph is impressive for its engine power, the rate of climb is "modest". The flight test program was completed in mid-April 1978, five months after its first flight.

=== Recognition and records ===
In June 1978 a Quickie prototype was flown to the Experimental Aircraft Association's annual gathering at EAA AirVenture Oshkosh at Oshkosh, Wisconsin, where the aircraft drew intense public interest and won the Outstanding New Design Award.

== Production ==
In June 1978, only two months after the prototype's first flight, Jewett and Sheehan formed the Quickie Aircraft Corporation to produce and sell complete aircraft kits. Production began in June 1978, and by 1980 the Corporation had sold 350 kits. Other firms were granted marketing rights, and ultimately some 1,000 Quickie kits were sold. The Corporation closed its doors in the mid 1980s.

== Aircraft on display ==
- British Columbia Aviation Museum
- Canada Aviation and Space Museum
- Canadian Museum of Flight
- Deutsches Museum
- EAA AirVenture Museum
- New England Air Museum

== Specifications (Prototype N77Q) ==
Data from Flight International The Canard Pusher No. 16

General characteristics

- Crew: One pilot
- Capacity: 236.5 lb (108 kg) useful load, pilots up to 6'5" 210lb, maximum luggage capacity 30 lb (9.1 kg)
- Length: 17 ft 4 in (5.28 m)
- Upper wingspan: 16 ft 8 in (5.08 m) main wing (rear)
- Lower wingspan: 15 ft 4 in (4.67 m) canard (forward)
- Height: 4 ft 5 in (1.35 m)
- Wing area: 53.8 sq ft (5.00 m^{2})
- Empty weight: 243.5 lb (110 kg)
- Gross weight: 480 lb (218 kg)
- Max takeoff weight: 485 lb (220 kg)
- Powerplant: 1 × Onan B48M opposed four-stroke piston engine, 18 hp (13 kW) at 3,600 rpm

Performance

- Maximum speed: 126 mph (203 km/h, 109 kn)
- Cruise speed: 121 mph (195 km/h, 105 kn)
- Stall speed: 47 mph (76 km/h, 41 kn) power on, 53mph power off
- Never exceed speed: 150 mph (240 km/h, 130 kn)
- Minimum control speed: 58 mph (93 km/h, 50 kn) "pitch bucking" occurs below this speed, ailerons remain effective.
- Range: 490–720 mi (790–1,160 km, 430–630 nmi) 121mph at 6,500' or 75mph at 10,500'
- Rate of climb: 425 ft/min (2.16 m/s)

== See also ==
- Quickie Aircraft Corporation
- Quickie Free Enterprise

Related development

- QAC Quickie Q2, two seater-variant by Quickie Aircraft Corporation

Aircraft of comparable role, configuration, and era

- Viking Dragonfly, two seater-variant by Viking Aircraft Company
- Rutan Amsoil racer, single-seat racer
