= List of air show accidents and incidents in the 20th century =

This is a year-by-year list of aviation accidents that have occurred at airshows worldwide in the 20th century.

== 2000 ==
- August 18 – Airbourne 2000 show (Eastbourne, East Sussex, England) – Former Red Arrows pilot Ted Girdler was killed when his Aero L-29 Delfín jet failed to pull up from a diving roll and crashed into the English Channel.
- June 18 – Willow Grove 2000 Sounds of Freedom Air Show (Willow Grove, Pennsylvania) – Two crew members of an Grumman F-14 Tomcat were killed when their aircraft lost altitude and crashed into a wooded area. They were demonstrating a low speed "landing wave-off maneuver" at the time of the accident.
- March 18 – Wings Over South Texas (Kingsville NAS, Texas) – Pilot Maj. Brison Phillips was killed when his F-16 Fighting Falcon crashed at an air show while thousands of horrified spectators watched. Phillips had been attempting a Split S maneuver, in which the pilot rolls the airplane until it is upside down and then drops in a dive. The plane hit the ground and exploded, scattering debris for half a mile in a field about 6 miles (9.7 km) north of the naval base about 12:45 p.m.

== 1999 ==
- October 3 – California International Airshow (Salinas, California) – Pilot Wayne Handley was seriously injured when his custom built Turbo Raven crashed during maneuvers. The NTSB attributed the crash to pilot error, but Handley attributed it to an engine malfunction.
- September 18 – Reno Air Races (also known as National Championship Air Races) – Pilot Gary Levitz, 61, a 30-year race veteran of Grand Prairie, Texas, was racing his highly modified Mustang P-51, which disintegrated during the Gold Unlimited race, scattering debris and damaging a house in Lemmon Valley, just east of the Stead Airport Base, where the races were being held. The NTSB had determined that the tail empennage failed in flight causing the aircraft to break apart.
- September 12 – Harriman-West Airport airshow (North Adams, Massachusetts) – Both pilots were killed when a Cessna 337C and a Cessna 305C collided in midair while conducting in-trail fly-bys.
- July 29 – EAA Airventure airshow (Oshkosh, Wisconsin) – Pilot Laird Doctor was seriously injured when his F4U Corsair collided with a stationary F8F Bearcat during its takeoff roll. The Corsair crashed in flames beside the runway and was destroyed. Howard Pardue, the pilot of the Bearcat, was not seriously injured but his aircraft suffered major damage.
- June 12 – Paris Air Show (Paris, France) – A Russian Air Force Sukhoi Su-30MKI demonstrator '01' (with canards and vectored thrust), crashed at Le Bourget Airport. At the completion of a downward spiraling maneuver, the tail contacted the grass surface. With almost no forward speed the fighter was able to pull away from the ground, wings level, with an up pitch of 10–15 degrees and climb to ~150 ft (46 m), with the right jet nozzle deflected fully up and flames engulfing the left engine. Sukhoi test pilot Vyacheslav Averynov initiated ejection with navigator Vladimir Shendrikh departing the aircraft first. The Zvezda K-36D-3.5 ejection seats worked perfectly and both crew descended on to a taxiway unhurt. The Su-30 impacted some distance from the crew. The incident was captured on video.
- June 6 – Milan Rastislav Stefanik airport airshow (Bratislava, Slovakia) – Test pilot Graham Wardell was killed when his BAE Systems Hawk 200 failed to pull out of a low turn and struck the ground. A female spectator was knocked off a nearby rooftop by the force of the explosion and died of her injuries.
- May 30 – Nowra, New South Wales, Australia – A vintage CAC Wirraway crashed during the display, killing pilot Owen O'Malley and observer Phil Lloyd.

== 1998 ==
- August 15 – Swanton Morley Airshow (East Dereham, Norfolk, England) – Pilot Christopher Wilkins was killed when his Rollason D31 Turbulent stalled and crashed while performing with the Tiger Club display team.
- July 3 – Traverse City, Michigan – During a practice flight prior to performing in the National Cherry Festival Air Show, an Aero L-39 Albatross went missing. Neither the plane nor its pilots were ever seen again.
- May 19 – DARE Airshow (Manassas, Virginia) – Pilot Dr. Miles Merritt was killed when his Sukhoi Su-29 crashed while performing a skidding turn at too low an "altitude".
- March 1 – Mount Gambier Airshow (Mount Gambier, South Australia) – An Air Tractor AT-802A crashed at the aerodrome whilst performing a low-level fire-fighting display. The pilot lost control after attempting a sudden steep climb at high speed and was killed in the crash. There were no other casualties in the incident.

== 1997 ==
- October 12 – Duxford, Cambridgeshire, England – The last airworthy World War II German Messerschmitt Bf 109 crashed while being flown by Air Chief Marshal Sir John Allison, Commander-in-Chief of RAF Strike Command. He was unhurt despite the plane coming to rest upside down. The plane, known to be difficult to land due to poor visibility from the cockpit and its narrow-track landing gear, had overshot the runway while landing following the malfunction of its Daimler-Benz DB 605 engine.
- September 20 – Sixth Annual Confederate Air Force Airshow (San Marcos, Texas) – An Aerotek Pitts S-2A aerobatic biplane piloted by James Kincaid crashed at the bottom of a snap roll and dive maneuver in front of a crowd of approximately 15,000. The pilot died from his injuries later that day. Witnesses reported that the plane did not have sufficient airspeed at the start of the sequence to keep from crashing at the bottom of the dive.
- September 14 – Chesapeake Air Show (Middle River, Maryland) – A Lockheed F-117, 81–793, of the 7th Fighter Squadron, 49th Fighter Wing, at Holloman AFB, New Mexico, lost its port wing at 1500 hrs. during a pass over Martin State Airport, and crashed into a residential area of Bowley's Quarters, Maryland, damaging several homes. Four people on the ground received minor injuries and the pilot, Maj. Bryan "B.K." Knight, 36, escaped with minor injuries after ejecting from the aircraft. A month-long Air Force investigation found that four of 39 fasteners for the wing's structural support assembly were apparently left off when the wings were removed and reinstalled in January 1996, according to a report released on December 12, 1997.
- July 26 – Ostend Airshow (Ostend, Belgium) – Captain Omar Hani Bilal of the Jordanian Air Force display team, the Royal Jordanian Falcons, was killed when he lost control of his Walter Extra EA300S. His plane crashed at the end of the runway and burst into flames near a Red Cross tent and spectator stands. On the ground, eight were killed and forty injured.
- June 22 – Wings Over Long Island Airshow (Westhampton, New York) – Two planes racing collided over Francis S. Gabreski Airport in front of 15,000 spectators. Pilot Dick Goodlett died when his aircraft crashed and burst into flames. The second plane crash-landed, critically injuring pilot Chris Kalishek.
- June 1 – Air Show Colorado 1997 (Broomfield, Colorado) – Ret. Colonel "Smiling Jack" Jack M. Rosamond was killed when he lost control of his restored F-86 Sabre Jet during an acrobatic loop at what was then known as Jefferson County Airport. Unseasonably high temperatures combined with the naturally high elevation (5,673 ft (1,729 m)) of the airport was thought to make the air less dense than expected, leading to poor effectiveness of flight control surfaces. Nobody else was injured in the accident.

== 1996 ==
- September 14 – Aerospace Days show (Fairchild Air Force Base, Spokane, Washington) – Bob Heale of Spokane was killed when his French CAP-10 crashed on its belly onto a dirt field in windy, rainy conditions. Investigators focused on possible mechanical problems with the 21-year-old plane. Bob Heale had also been a regular performer at the Silverwood Theme Park in Athol, Idaho.
- August 4 – Three Rivers Regatta (Pittsburgh, Pennsylvania) – Pilot Clarence Speal was killed when the left hand wings on his biplane folded back, which caused him to lose control and crash into the Ohio River.
- July 21 – Barton Aerodrome air show (Barton-upon-Irwell, Greater Manchester, England) – The last de Havilland Mosquito known to be airworthy (serial number RR299), a T Mk. III built at Leavesden in Spring 1945, crashed with the loss of both crew after suffering loss of engine power when performing a wing-over maneuver. The incident was captured on video.
- July 14 – Flying Legends Air Display (Duxford, Cambridgeshire, England) – Pilot Michael "Hoof" Proudfoot was killed when his Lockheed P-38 Lightning aircraft crashed and cartwheeled while performing a roll maneuver. Several aircraft on the ground were damaged or destroyed.
- June 2 – Bartlesville Biplane Exposition (Bartlesville, Oklahoma) – Two biplanes clipped wings on landing killing all four aboard: William Watson, 71; John Halterman, 51; Rodney Bogan, 41; and Annette Delahay, 45.
- 4 May – Sertoma Cajun Air Festival (Lafayette, Louisiana) – Pilot Joe Hartung, 44, perished when the Canadian-built Harvard Mk. II he was flying hit the runway while performing a low altitude roll.
- April 27 – Shiloh Airshow (Stoneville, North Carolina) – Pilot Lindsey Hess escaped injury when his Pitts S2 A crashed inverted on the runway following his attempt to cut a ribbon with the plane.
- April 16 – EAA Sun 'n Fun (Lakeland, Florida) – Pilot Charlie Hillard was killed when his Hawker Sea Fury flipped over while landing in a crosswind.

== 1995 ==
- September 9 – Johannisthal, Germany – A DASA-operated Messerschmitt Bf 108 Taifun, D-EFPT, crashed during an airshow, killing pilot Gerd Kahdemann and passenger Reinhard Furrer, a former astronaut who had flown in space for Germany in 1985 during the STS-61A mission aboard the Space Shuttle Challenger. After completing an aerobatic display, the Bf 108 was seen to climb and attempt an aileron turn with increased pitch that developed into a barrel-roll into the ground at a ~90-degree angle. A piece of the airframe that came loose while the aircraft was inverted was found to be the starboard wing leading edge slat.
- September 2 – Canadian International Air Show (Toronto, Ontario) – Seven Royal Air Force crew members were killed when their Hawker Siddeley Nimrod MR.2P stalled during a low altitude turn and crashed into Lake Ontario.
- August 17 – Moscow Airshow (Moscow, Russia) – Natalia Sergeeva died while performing at the airshow. She was the Women's Aerobatic Champion at the World Aerobatic Championship in Switzerland in 1990.

== 1994 ==
- June 24 – Fairchild Air Force Base (Spokane, Washington) – A Boeing B-52 Stratofortress registered 61-0026, performing a demonstration flight for an airshow at Fairchild Air Force Base, stalled and crashed due to its pilot, Lieutenant Colonel Arthur Bud Holland pushing the aircraft beyond its operational limits. The aircraft exploded, killing all 4 on board.
- June 11 – Selfridge Air National Guard Base, Mount Clemens, Michigan – Ray Mabery was killed when his Canadair T-33 crashed during an unplanned roll.
- April 3 – Warbirds Over Wanaka display (Wanaka, New Zealand) – Ian Reynolds died when his de Havilland Canada DHC-1 Chipmunk 22A crashed after he misjudged the arch of his dive.

== 1993 ==
- October 3 – Lanseria Air Show (Lanseria International Airport, Johannesburg, South Africa) – Silver Falcon 5, an Atlas Impala Mk1 no 489, piloted by Charles Rudenick, crashed at Lanseria Airport after structural failure. The pilot initiated the ejection sequence half a second before impact. He came out horizontally with the fuselage vertical and a high downward velocity. He was killed when he was "sucked" into the crash fireball.
- September 14 – Reno Air Races – Pilot Rick Brickert died when his unlimited plane, named "Pond Racer", crashed in the desert while preparing to land following an engine malfunction.
- August 22 – Prairie Air '93 Air Show (Bloomington, Illinois) – A Pitts Special flown by Charlie Wells crashed while performing a Lomcevak. Wells was killed instantly when the plane hit the ground. No one on the ground was injured, and the airshow continued despite the accident; however, no more aerobatic planes performed for the remainder of the day.
- August 8 – Stockholm Water Festival (Stockholm, Sweden) – A JAS 39 Gripen, 39102, crashed on the central Stockholm island of Långholmen, near the Västerbron bridge, during a slow speed maneuver. Lars Rådeström, who had also been involved in an incident in 1989, ejected safely. Despite large crowds standing by watching, no one on the ground was seriously injured. The crash was caused by a pilot-induced oscillation (PIO).
- July 24 – Lebanon, New Hampshire – A biplane collided with a parachutist in the opening act of the Lebanon Airshow. Both the pilot and the parachutist died as a result of the collision. No other injuries were sustained.
- July 24 – Royal International Air Tattoo – (Fairford, Gloucestershire, England) – Two MiG-29s of the Russian Air Force "Test Pilots" aerobatic team collided in mid-air and crashed away from the public. No one was hurt on the ground, and both pilots (Alexander Beschastonov and Sergey Tresvyatsk) ejected safely. Investigators later determined that pilot error was the cause: one pilot did a reverse loop and disappeared into the clouds, the other one lost sight of his wingman and aborted the routine. The incident was captured on video.
- June 27 – Concord, New Hampshire – Ron Shelly and his daughter, Karen Shelly Duggan, who were performing a father-daughter wing walking act, were killed when their plane crashed after failing to come out of a roll.
- 2 May – Marine Corps Air Station El Toro, California – A vintage F-86 Sabre crashed and exploded in the middle of a runway after civilian pilot James A. Gregory failed to come out of a vertical loop several hundred feet in front of spectators. The impact killed the pilot and sent flaming debris along the runway. No one on the ground was injured. The incident was captured on video.

== 1992 ==
- June 29 – Quad City Airshow (Davenport, Iowa) – An AV-8B Harrier leaving the airshow crashed on takeoff, killing pilot Maj. Jeffrey Smith.
- June 27 – Woodford Airshow (Woodford, Greater Manchester, England) – David Moore was killed when his Supermarine Spitfire Mk.XIV crashed into the runway at Woodford Aerodrome during a low level loop.
- April 5 – Valiant Air Command Warbird Air Show (Titusville, Florida) – Harry Doan, 62, landed his Skyraider, taxied and went off the runway, flipping into soft sand, nose end first. The pilot was crushed and killed.

== 1991 ==
- August 11 – Byron's Original Aviation Expo (Ida Grove, Iowa) – Pilot Mack Stevens Orr, a member of the Confederate Air Force, died following the crash of his T-6 Texan during a reenactment of the bombing of Pearl Harbor.
- August 5 – Northeast Flight '91 Airshow (Schenectady, New York) – Five crew members of a Canadian forces Sea King H-3 helicopter were injured when their craft lost altitude while hovering, crashed and flipped on its side.
- June 23 – Quad City Air Show (Davenport, Iowa) – Pilot Rick Leonard was killed during an air race when the wing of his Monnett Sonerai I separated while making a turn.
- June 22 – Redding Airshow (Redding, California) – Pilot Gordy Drysdale, 43, of Stockton was killed when his T-34 failed to complete a low altitude roll and impacted the ground near spectators. Two were hospitalized in serious condition. A 34-year-old man suffered back injuries when hit by debris and a 30-year-old woman sustained several fractures as a result of the crash. Drysdale was the tail pilot of the four-member Brew Angels aerobatic team, which was performing a stunt called an end-tail roll.
- 26 May – Schofields Airport, Blacktown, New South Wales, Australia – The pilot of a Bellanca Decathlon was killed when his aircraft stalled and crashed.

== 1990 ==
- September 23 – Martin State Airport, Baltimore County, Maryland – 62-year-old pilot Jack B. Poage died after crashing his red-and-white Pitts S-2B during an air show after he added a fourth corkscrew maneuver to three that were expected during a nosedive. He pulled the aircraft out of the corkscrew but had insufficient altitude and the Pitts Special hit the ground on its belly. Carroll County Regional Airport, which he managed at the time, was given the additional name "Jack B. Poage Field" in his honor.
- September 16 – Pápa, Hungary – A Hungarian MiG-23MF "04" crashed during an aerobatic display. The pilot, Major Károly Soproni, died.
- September 9 – Salgareda, Italy – A Soviet Su-27 coded "14 Red" crashed during an aerobatic display, killing its test pilot Rimantas Stankevičius.
- August 2 – EAA National Convention (Wittman Field, Oshkosh, Wisconsin) – Pilot John Lewkowicz died after crashing his Boeing Stearman A75N-1 during an air show. The aircraft was engaged in performing aerobatic maneuvers, entered a slow roll to the left, and, at approximately the inverted position, departed controlled flight. It then entered into an uncommanded snap roll to the left. The aircraft completed three-quarters of the roll, stopped in knife-edge flight and descended approximately 200 to 300 ft (61 to 91 m) into the terrain.
- July 2 – Friendship Festival (Buffalo, New York) – Pilot Giff Foley was killed when his AT-6 lost altitude and crashed into the Niagara River.
- July 1 – National Capital Air Show (Ottawa, Ontario, Canada) – Harry E. Tope was killed when his P-51 Mustang crashed into a golf course.
- June 30 – Groton Air Show (Groton, Connecticut) – Russell Gage was killed while attempting to roll his aircraft on takeoff.
- June 17 – Aerospace America (Will Rogers World Airport, Oklahoma City, Oklahoma) – A small aircraft piloted by aerobatic champion Tom Jones crashed while performing during the Oklahoma City air show. He was killed in the crash that was attributed to a low altitude stall.
- 27 May – Memorial Day Air Show (Tuskegee, Alabama) – Pilot Albert Butler was killed while attempting a rollover at a low altitude.

== 1989 ==
- October 8 – Indian Air Force Day (New Delhi, India) – Wing Commander Ramesh 'Joe' Bakshi of the Indian Air Force was killed when his Mirage 2000 crashed while performing a Downward Charlie (a series of downward rolls in the vertical plane, pulling out with wings level at a specific height). A dozen spectators were injured, one fatally, from the explosions and fire.
- September 3 – Canadian International Air Show (Toronto, Ontario) – Captain Shane Antaya, flying for the Canadian Forces Snowbirds team, died after a mid-air collision during a demonstration when his Tutor crashed into Lake Ontario. During the same accident, team commander Major Dan Dempsey safely ejected from his aircraft.
- June 8 – Paris Air Show (Paris, France) – During a low-speed, high angle-of-attack portion of Mikoyan's test pilot Anatoly Kvochur's routine display flight, a bird sucked into the turbofan of his MiG-29's right engine caused it to malfunction. After steering the MiG away from spectators, Kvochur managed to eject from the MiG seconds before his aircraft hit the ground. The incident was captured on video.

== 1988 ==
- September 5 – Farnborough Air Show (Farnborough, England) – A Soviet Antonov 124 suffered engine failure and aborted its takeoff.
- August 28 – Kleine Brogel Air Base, Peer, Belgium – Pilot Ari Piippo was killed when the Aermacchi M-290 RediGO he was demonstrating failed to come out of a spin.
- August 28 – Ramstein air show disaster (Ramstein, Germany) – Three members of Italy's Frecce Tricolori Air Force Display Team flying Aermacchi MB-339s were involved in a mid-air collision. Three pilots, Lt. Col. Ivo Nutarelli, Lt. Col. Mario Naldini and Cap. Giorgio Alessio were killed, and wreckage from the collision landed on the spectators, killing 31 people outright, mortally wounding 39 more and seriously injuring 346. Until 2002, this was the deadliest airshow accident.
- August 7 – Leopoldsburg, Belgium – Belgian Air Force pilot Michel Duvivier was killed when his Mirage 5 jet crashed at an air show organized by the Belgian Air Force.
- June 26 – Habsheim Airshow (Mulhouse, Alsace, France) – While performing a gear down low speed pass, Air France Flight 296, a chartered Air France Airbus A320 lost altitude and crashed into a treeline. Three of the 136 persons aboard were killed.
- 31 May – Warwickshire Air Pageant (Baginton, England) – RAF Flight Lieutenant Peter Stacey was killed when his Meteor T.7 lost altitude and crashed during a descending turn. Lieutenant Stacey was said to have stayed with the aircraft and steered it away from a residential area prior to the crash.
- April 24 – Marine Corps Air Station El Toro, California – Marine Corps Colonel Jerry Cadick, then commanding officer of MAG-11, was performing aerobatics before a crowd of 300,000 when he crashed his F/A-18 Hornet at the bottom of a loop that was too close to the ground. The aircraft was in a nose-high attitude, but still carrying too much momentum toward the ground when it impacted at more than 300 mph (480 km/h). Col. Cadick was subjected to extremely high G forces that resulted in his face making contact with the control stick, sustaining serious injuries. He broke his arm, elbow and ribs, exploded a vertebra and collapsed a lung. Col. Cadick survived and retired from the Marine Corps. The F/A-18 remained largely intact but was beyond repair.
- April 11 – Sun 'N Fun Fly (Lakeland, Florida) – Pilot Ron Cox was injured after making a hard landing due to an onboard fire that occurred during a stunt presentation.

== 1987 ==
- September 6 – Mammoth Lakes Air Show (Mammoth Lakes, California) – Civilian stunt pilot Gary Loundagin, 42, of Livermore, California, was killed when his vintage T-34B aircraft crashed. He had executed a loop maneuver with insufficient altitude for recovery. The aircraft impacted next to the runway but did not explode. The high elevation of the airport was probably not accounted for by Loundagin, contributing to the mishap.
- August 8 – Fairfield County Air Show (Lancaster, Ohio) – Pilot James King was killed when his biplane crashed while performing at the air show.

== 1986 ==
- June 28 – SHAPE International Air Show (Chièvres Air Base, Belgium) – After hovering a Hawker Siddeley Harrier GR.3 with a rearward movement, parallel to the public line at about 200 m (660 ft) of altitude, RAF Flt. Lt. Brian D. Weatherley ended with a nose down attitude that seemed steeper than usual. The aircraft nose kept going down past a recoverable angle. The pilot ejected while the aircraft was pointing straight towards the ground, still roughly stationary. He hit the ground before his parachute opened and later died from injuries sustained in the ejection. After the pilot ejected, the airplane went almost belly up and fell to the ground with a loud boom, explosion and black smoke.
- July 24 – RAF Brawdy Air Show (Brawdy, Wales, UK) – A US Phantom jet crashed into the sea off the coast. Eyewitness accounts at the time suggested something had fallen off the plane, before it rapidly headed for the sea, away from the crowds. The pilot and copilot both died. There were no injuries on the ground.
- 26 May – Berlin Municipal Airport, Milan, New Hampshire – Pilot Robert Weymouth, known as "The Flying Farmer", was killed when he failed to recover during a descent.
- 26 May – Mildenhall Air Show (Mildenhall, Suffolk) – The crew of a RAF Meteor was killed following the mid air collision with a RAF Vampire. The crew of the Vampire was able to parachute to safety.

== 1985 ==
- July 13 – Western New York Air Show '85 (Niagara Falls International Airport, New York) – Blue Angels Aircraft 5, BuNo 155029, and 6, BuNo 154992, both Douglas A-4F Skyhawks, collided at the top of a loop, killing one pilot, Lt. Cmdr. Michael Gershon. The other pilot, Lt. Andy Caputi, ejected safely with only minor injuries. One Skyhawk crashed in the airport grounds while the second fighter fell onto a nearby auto junkyard. The demonstration team resumed their show duties on July 20 at Dayton, Ohio but omitted the maneuver that resulted in the crash, and flew with five planes rather than six.
- 5 May – Lemoore Naval Air Station Air Show (Lemoore Station, California) – Civilian stunt pilot Kirk R. McKee of Sacramento, California, stalled his AT6A "Texan" aircraft after recovering from a Reverse Cuban Eight maneuver at low altitude. The aircraft crashed in an inverted, nose down attitude and exploded.
- April 27 – El Toro Marine Corps Air Station, California – An AT-6 crashed during an air show when it apparently lost power, snagged a power line, smacked into the street and then slid into the chapel, killing the pilot Merrel Richard Gossman, 55, and passenger Robert G. Arrowsmith, 25. No one on the ground was hurt.

== 1984 ==
- November 11 – Fairview Fly-in and Air Show (Fairview, Oklahoma) – Civilian stunt pilot Tom McGuire crashed while flying a North American SNJ-5 Texan, registered N91047. While recovering from a left aileron roll, the aircraft nose dropped and the aircraft turned 45 degrees to the right of the runway heading, then impacted the ground in a shallow dive with the right wing low, killing the pilot. No one on the ground was hurt.
- September 4 – Farnborough Air Show (Farnborough, England) – A de Havilland Canada DHC-5D Buffalo plane, registered C-GCTC, was damaged beyond repair in an accident during the 1984 Farnborough Airshow. Following a STOL display, the aircraft performed a very steep descending right turn onto the threshold of the runway. Shortly before touchdown, the rate of descent reduced slightly. The aircraft then landed very hard. The nose gear collapsed, both wings failed and the propellers disintegrated after contacting the runway. Debris caused some damage to vehicles and three aircraft in the static display area.
- August 12 – Fairyhouse Racecourse, Ireland – A PZL-104 Wilga, registered SP-AFX, was one of three Wilgas flying in formation at an airshow at the racecourse. The aircraft were about to fly in front of the main stand when the aircraft stalled and crashed, killing the pilot, Jan Baran. There were no other fatalities.
- June 3 – Großostheim, near Aschaffenburg, Germany – A Hawker Siddeley Harrier GR3 launched vertically for a demonstration flight in front of the audience. The landing gear was extended during the Harrier was hovering. Because of a leak in the fuel supply, fuel dripped onto the landing gear and ignited. The engine was sucking up smoke and lost thrust. At a height of about 90 ft (27 m), the Harrier crashed next to the runway and burst into flames, around 100 ft (30 m) away from the audience. The pilot was able to escape with the ejection seat but the falling seat killed a spectator.
- April 8 – Canary Islands Air Show (Canary Islands) – Pilot Augustin Gil de Montes lost control and crashed his Z-50 shortly after takeoff. He was killed along with four spectators, and fourteen others were injured, after his plane burst into flames and crashed through a barrier where the spectators were standing.

== 1983 ==
- September 11 – Plainview, Texas – The wings of a Partenavia P.68C separated from the root just outboard of the engine nacelles during a high-speed, high-G maneuver beyond the design parameters of the aircraft and plummeted to the ground, killing the pilot. The accident was caught on film.
- August 26 – Scarborough, UK – A Lightning F3 XP753 stalled and crashed 200 yds from the shoreline, killing pilot Flt/Lt Mike Thompson whilst performing an unauthorised flying display at a seafront event.
- July 31 – Experimental Aircraft Association (Oshkosh, Wisconsin) – Arlin Pestes was killed when his Van's Aircraft RV-3 lost altitude and crashed during a formation fly over.
- July 9 – Gadsden Airport, Gadsden, Alabama – Pilot Harry Claxton and passenger Dr. George Horn were killed when their Aeronca AR-7 dove and crashed while making a turn during a mock battle. It is believed that loose tools and missing cover boots caused the control yoke to jam, causing the accident.
- 22 May – Rhein-Main Air Base, Frankfurt, Germany – A Canadian Forces CF-104 Starfighter, 104813, of 439 Sqn., departed controlled flight and exploded on impact on the B43 highway. The resulting fireball engulfed the car of priest Martin Jürges and killed three adults and two children. The sixth passenger in the car, Jürges' niece, died months later from her burns. A Canadian Forces spokesman said that the CF-104, flown by Capt. Alan J. Stephenson, 27, was in a formation of five Starfighters, and that he was to do a solo display. He had done two complete circuits and had leveled off for a low-speed fly-past when the plane malfunctioned. He ejected safely.
- 15 May – Barton Airfield, Manchester, England – Stunt pilot Mike Watkins was killed when he lost control of his Jurca Gnatsum, entered a corkscrew spin, and crashed.

== 1982 ==
- November 14 – Hamamatsu, Japan – Captain Takashima Kiyoshi was killed and 12 spectators were injured when the Mitsubishi T-2B he was flying as part of the Blue Impulse aerobatic demonstration team failed to pull out of a vertical dive and crashed into a building.
- September 11 – Mannheim, Germany – A United States Army CH-47 Chinook (serial number 74-22292) crashed while carrying British, French, and German parachutists who planned to jump when the helicopter reached an altitude of 12,000 ft (3,700 m). All 46 aboard were killed. The crash was later found to be caused by an accumulation of ground walnut shells that had been used to clean the machinery.
- 16 May – Shelby County Air Show (Alabaster, Alabama) – Pilot Don Smith was killed when his Piper J-3 Cub failed to pull out of a spin.
- January 18 – Indian Springs Air Force Auxiliary Field, Nevada – Four T-38As, piloted by members of the United States Air Force Thunderbirds, crashed while flying in a diamond formation and hit the desert floor almost simultaneously. All 4 USAF pilots were killed in what is also known as the Diamond crash.

== 1981 ==
- 9 May – Hill Air Force Base, Utah – A U.S. Air Force Thunderbirds Northrop T-38 Talon crashed while performing the Hi-Lo Maneuver, killing pilot Captain David "Nick" Hauck. Capt. Hauk, in Thunderbird 6, crashed while attempting to land his ailing T-38 after an engine malfunctioned and caught fire. With black smoke billowing from the exhaust and the aircraft losing altitude in a high nose-up attitude, the safety officer on the ground radioed Capt Hauck, "You’re on fire, punch out", to which he responded, “Hang on... we have a bunch of people down there”. The aircraft continued to fight to stay airborne for about half a mile before hitting a large oak tree and a barn, then sliding across a field and flipping as it traversed an irrigation canal ultimately erupting into a fireball just a few hundred feet from the runway's end. No one on the ground was injured even though the accident occurred adjacent to a roadway packed with onlookers.

== 1980 ==
- September 21 – Joliet Park District Airport, Joliet, Illinois – Three United States Marine service members were killed and one injured when their Huey H-1 helicopter stalled and crashed when it pulled up from a low high speed pass.
- September 21 – Biggin Hill Battle of Britain Airshow (Biggin Hill, London, England) – A Douglas A-26 Invader crashed during an air display. The aircraft was attempting to carry out a climbing roll in front of the crowd when the nose dropped sharply, and the aircraft continued rolling until it dropped vertically into a valley. The pilot and seven passengers were killed. The Civil Aviation Authority subsequently introduced rules preventing passengers from being carried during air displays.
- June 15 – Shannon Airport, Fredericksburg, Virginia – Sgt. 1st Class Tom Johnson, a parachute jumper with the U.S. Army Golden Knights, fell over 10,000 ft (3,000 m) to his death when both of his parachutes (main and reserve) failed to deploy.
- April 17 – American Samoan Flag Day (Pago Pago, American Samoa) – The seven member crew of an American Navy P-3 Orion were killed when their plane struck a cable car wire, lost its right wing and tail, and cartwheeled into a local hotel causing a fire. Five hotel staff and one guest were injured in the accident, which destroyed one wing of the hotel.
- July 4 – Willow Grove NAS, Willow Grove, Pennsylvania – John Pigford, 7, was killed after accidentally activating an ejection seat.

== 1979 ==
- 27 May – RAF Mildenhall Air Fete (RAF Mildenhall, UK) – Capt. Piergianni Petri of the Frecce Tricolori crashed and died while flying a Fiat G91 that failed to recover from its dive during a "Bomb Burst" maneuver and crashed near the village of Beck Row. No one on the ground was injured during the accident.
- July 6 – Chicksands Royal Air Force Base, Chicksands, England – Pilot Colonel Thomas 'Tommy' B Thompson, 81st TFW Assistant Deputy Commander for Operations (ADO), USAFE, was killed when his A-10A WR, 77-0253, crashed while doing low-level aerobatics. It was reported that he stayed with his plane and steered it away from the crowds.
- August 3 – Fleet Air Arm Open Day (RNAS Yeovilton, UK) – A Marineflieger Lockheed F-104G Starfighter had just performed a flying display and was turning from base leg to final approach when it stalled and crashed; KptLt Manfred Stürmer ejected too late and was killed.
- September 3 – Labor Day parade (Dillon, Montana) – Captain Joel Rude, 32 years old, of Great Falls, Montana, a flight training instructor for the Montana Air National Guard, was killed when his U.S. Air Force F-106 Delta Dart from the 186th Fighter-Interceptor Squadron was making a low flight over Dillon's main street, crashed into a grain elevator and exploded, killing the pilot and setting a bulk oil storage plant on fire. Much of the city's electrical power was knocked out, the police reported. At least eight other persons on the ground were injured, four of them severely enough to be admitted to hospitals.

== 1978 ==
- November 8 – NAS Miramar, San Diego, California – One of the solo Skyhawks of the Blue Angels struck the ground after low roll during arrival maneuvers, and Navy Lieutenant Michael Curtin was killed. The accident was caught on film.
- August 12 – Naval Air Station Glenview, Glenview, Illinois – An Avro Vulcan B2, registration XL390, of the 617 Squadron Royal Air Force crashed during an air display. All four Royal Air Force crew members were killed. Their delta-winged bomber apparently stalled during a wing-over and then crashed into a landfill just north of Willow Road.
- 3 May – Grande Prairie, Alberta – Captain Gordon de Jong of the Canadian Forces Snowbirds died when the horizontal stabilizer failed, rendering the aircraft uncontrollable. Although ejection was initiated, it was not successful.
- February 25 – Dubbo Airshow (Dubbo, New South Wales, Australia) – Pilot Bryan Hindle was killed when his motorized hang glider crashed during an air show.

== 1977 ==
- October 9 – Air Show Africa (Lanseria Airport, near Johannesburg, South Africa) – Demonstration Pilot Peter Philips, flying a Britten-Norman Trislander in a flying display, performed a second wing-over and had insufficient altitude to recover. The plane impacted the runway, bounced into the air and came to rest some 500 m (1,600 ft) further off to the side of the runway. The flying controls were disabled, and main gear detached. One wing engine detached. Philips was accompanied by Mike Wrigly, and both survived with minor injuries although they had to spend a few days in hospital. The aircraft was written off.
- September 23 – Suffolk Air Fair press preview (Westhampton Beach, New York) – Stunt pilot Edward H. Mahler was killed at Suffolk County Airport when the tail section of his biplane separated at an altitude of 300 ft (91 m). An hour before the accident, he had repaired a loose strut on the tail section of his plane.
- September 4 – Richmond, Indiana – Parachutist John Steinemann was pulled out of N4111A, a C-45 H Expeditor aircraft, at 14:25 hours, hit the tail of the plane and was killed. The damage was substantial.
- September 2 – Canadian International Air Show (Toronto, Ontario) – Pilot Alan Ness was killed when his Fairey Firefly lost altitude and crashed in Lake Ontario while taking part in a formation flight.
- August 21 – Evergreen Airpark, Vancouver, Washington – Stunt pilot Harry Eyerly was killed when his Pitts Special failed to recover from a spin.
- June 3 – Paris Air Show (Paris, France) – Test pilot Howard W. "Sam" Nelson was killed when his A-10 Thunderbolt II crashed after coming out of a loop at low altitude.
- 15 May – Biggin Hill Air Show (Biggin Hill, London, England) – Five persons were killed and one injured when a sightseeing helicopter struck the underside of a de Havilland Tiger Moth biplane at an altitude of 200 ft (61 m). The biplane, with "its undercarriage sheared off", was able to land safely with no injuries to the pilot or passenger.

== 1976 ==
- September 26 – Weyers Cave Air Show (Weyers Cave, Virginia) – Flight instructor Gerry Presson was killed when his plane stalled as he pulled out of a climb and crashed.
- August 28 – Gathering of Warbirds (Fresno, California) – Pilot Cliff Anderson was killed when his home built Stolp Starduster I SA100 aerobatic biplane crashed and burned after he was unable to recover from an inverted spin.

== 1975 ==
- September 13 – Reno Air Races – M.D. Washburn, 40, of Houston, Texas, died when the wing of his North American T-6 Texan clipped a pylon and crashed while in a tight formation at the start of the race.
- September 13 – Reno Air Races – While wing walking, Gordon McCollom of Costa Mesa, California, was hanging under a plane piloted by Joe Hughes. It suddenly dropped too close to the runway in what one official called a "freakish downdraft" and McCollom scraped his upper head on the runway, dying instantly. Hughes was able to regain control of the plane and land. The accident occurred directly in front of the grandstand, just 15 minutes after Washburn's fatal accident. The accident was caught on film.
- September 6 – Fleet Air Arm Open Day (RNAS Yeovilton, UK) – RAF Flight Lieutenant Stephen Beckley died when getting out of his Harrier GR3 following a display, as the ejector seat accidentally fired. He was thrown 30 ft (9.1 m) in the air and died shortly after arriving at Yeovil Hospital.

== 1974 ==
- September 8 – South Weymouth Naval Air Station (Abington, Massachusetts) – A Bellanca 8KCAB Decathlon, N86589, crashed nearly vertically into the ground and killed its pilot while performing a controlled, acrobatic, half-twist maneuver. The plane caught fire after impact. The error was attributed to misjudged altitude and clearance.
- September 1 – Farnborough Air Show (Farnborough, England) – Co-pilot Stewart Craig was killed instantly and pilot Kurt Cannon died nine days after their Sikorsky S-67 Blackhawk helicopter crashed during low level maneuvers.
- July 28 – General Mitchell International Airport, Milwaukee, Wisconsin – United States Marine Captain Stephen Torrent suffered minor injuries after ejecting from his Hawker Harrier that dove and crashed while demonstrating vertical takeoffs.

== 1973 ==
- June 3 – Paris Air Show (Paris, France) – The first production Tupolev Tu-144 supersonic airliner crashed after it disintegrated in mid-air during a flight demonstration, killing all six on board and eight on the ground. The cause of the crash is controversial; factors cited include pilot error, mechanical failure and possible interference by a French Mirage IIIR aircraft sent up to photograph the Soviet airplane. A full investigative report was not released.
- July 8 – Lake Charles, Louisiana – Lt. Steve Lambert, flying a Blue Angels F-4J Phantom II s/n 153876, had a mechanical problem and had to eject from his aircraft during that Sunday's performance. Lt. Lambert survived with only minor scratches, his aircraft was destroyed.
- August 12 – Abbotsford International Airshow (Abbotsford, British Columbia) – While nearing the end of the McDonnell CF-101 Voodoo demonstration Capt John Pew and navigator Capt Gary Raindahl experienced inertia roll coupling, pulling into a rolling climb. The jet disintegrated into several fireballs. While the pair survived the ordeal, both aviators suffered 3rd degree burns as they ejected through the fireball wreckage in the sky. The wreckage landed south of the airport in a field in Sumas, Washington.

== 1972 ==
- September 24 – Golden West Sport Aviation Show (Sacramento, California) – A privately owned F-86 Sabre jet piloted by Richard Bingham failed to take off while leaving the show. The jet went through a chain link fence at the end of the runway, across Freeport Boulevard, crushed a parked car and then crashed into a local Farrell's Ice Cream Parlour. Twenty-two people were killed, including twelve children and two people in the parked car.
- June 10 – Trenton Air Show (CFB Trenton, Ontario) – Royal Canadian Air Force Snowbirds solo Captain Lloyd Waterer died after a wingtip collision with another solo aircraft while performing an opposing solo maneuver.
- June 4 – Transpo 72 Airshow (Dulles International Airport, Dulles, Virginia) – U.S. Air Force Thunderbirds pilot Major Joe Howard, flying Thunderbird 3, F-4 Phantom II 66-0321, lost power during a vertical maneuver, breaking out of formation just after completing a wedge roll at around 2,500 ft (760 m). The aircraft staggered and descended in a flat attitude with little forward speed. Howard ejected and descended under a good canopy, but winds blew him into the ascending fireball from the crashed aircraft, melting his parachute; Howard plummeted 200 ft (61 m) and sustained fatal injuries.
- June 3 – Transpo 72 Airshow (Dulles International Airport, Dulles, Virginia) – During a sport plane pylon race, while turning around a pylon, a trailing aircraft's wing and propeller hit the tip of the right wing of a leading aircraft, shearing the leading aircraft's wing off the fuselage. The damaged aircraft crashed almost instantly, killing the pilot, professional Air Racer Hugh C. Alexander of Louisville, Georgia.
- May 29 – Transpo 72 Airshow (Dulles International Airport, Dulles, Virginia) – The first accident of the air show involved a "Kite Rider" — a variety of hang glider that was being towed by a vehicle. The craft suffered a structural failure and collapsed, killing the pilot.

== 1971 ==
- August 22 – Seething, Norfolk, England – Pilot Neville Browning was killed while inverted during a "Flying Farmer" performance.
- June 6 – Robertson Airfield, Plainville, Connecticut – Pilot Gilbert Gillete was killed when his biplane entered a spin at low altitude.
- June 5 – Quonset Point Air Show (Quonset Point, Rhode Island) – J.W. "Bill" Fornof, flying an F8F Bearcat, died after losing a wing to metal fatigue.

== 1970 ==
- September 26 – St. Paul, Minnesota – Mechanic Sgt. Foster G. Crump was killed and pilot Col. Robert Leighton was injured when their replica 1919 biplane crashed shortly after takeoff.
- September 11 – Farnborough Air Show (Farnborough, England) – A Wallis WA-117 Gyrocopter was being demonstrated for the Society of British Aerospace Companies (SBAC). After a high-speed downwind run parallel to the runway, the aircraft first pitched rapidly nose-up, then nose-down, and went out of control, with the rotor blades striking the propeller, fin and rudder as it fell to the ground. The pilot was killed instantly.
- August 30 – Eastern Iowa Airport, Cedar Rapids, Iowa – One of the members of the US Navy Blue Angels belly-landed at with one engine stuck in afterburner. The pilot ejected safely and the aircraft ran off the runway.
- June 27 – Woodford Airshow (Woodford, Greater Manchester, England) – A Hornet Gyrocopter crashed, killing its pilot. The accident occurred when the rotor broke, smashing the rudder and causing the gyrocopter to lose control.
- February 15 – Wellsford Airstrip, Bendigo, Australia – Pilot Donald Busch was killed when his P-51 Mustang crashed after it gained altitude and rolled over following a fly past of the show grounds.

== 1969 ==
- August 8 – Abbotsford Air Show (Abbotsford, British Columbia) – At noon, a Boeing 747 airliner made its Canadian debut with a low flypast to open the first day of the three-day airshow. This was followed a few minutes later by an inverted pass of a much smaller aircraft, a Midget Mustang, along the same flight line. Nearing midfield, the Mini Mustang N9N suddenly dove vertically into the ground, killing the pilot, 20-year-old flight instructor Scott Nelskog of Washington State.
- June 4 – Reading Air Show (Reading, Pennsylvania) – Captain Dick Schram, a Naval Reserve Aviator billed as the "Flying Professor", was killed when his Piper Cub failed to pull out of a dive during a comedy flying routine. His son, a public affairs officer with the United States Navy Blue Angels, was announcing the routine at the time of the crash.

== 1968 ==
- September 20 – Farnborough Air Show (Farnborough, England) – Six members of the French Air Force were killed when their Breguet 1150 Atlantic crashed while performing a single engine demonstration.
- 17 May – Armed Forces Day Air Show (Holloman Air Force Base, New Mexico) – A United States Air Force F-111 experienced a tailstrike while landing and skidded to a stop 100 yards (91 m) from 2,000 spectators.

== 1967 ==
- October 21 – Laughlin AFB, Texas, United States – A Thunderbird F-100D piloted by Tony McPeak (14th Chief of Staff of the Air Force from 1990-1994) crashed. The accident occurred during the "Bomb Burst" maneuver, when the solo aircraft piloted by McPeak shed its wings during a vertical rolling climb. The accident was attributed to failure of the wing structure due to fatigue. McPeak successfully ejected from the aircraft.
- June 4 – Paris Air Show (Paris, France) – A member of the Patrouille de France Display Team, died when his Fouga Magister went out of control during the display at the 1967 Paris Air Show.

== 1966 ==
- September 2 – Canadian International Air Show (Toronto, Ontario) – US Navy Blue Angels pilot Lt. Cmdr. Dick Oliver was killed when he crashed his F-11 Tiger into a breakwater at Toronto Island Airport. The incident was caught on video.
- August 13 – Aviation Day (Amarillo Air Force Base, Texas) – Shelby M. Kritser, chairman of the Texas Aeronautics Commission, was killed when his F8F-2 Bearcat, N7826C, b/n 121699, crashed during an attempted hammerhead stall.
- July 23 – Porter County Municipal Airport, Valparaiso, Indiana – Stunt pilot Bill Adams was killed when the wing separated from his biplane during an outside snap roll.

== 1965 ==
- June 15 – Paris Air Show (Paris, France) – United States Air Force Lt Colonel Charles D. Tubbs was killed and two other crewmen injured when their B-58 Hustler bomber crashed. The plane landed short of the runway, struck the "instrument approach beacons" and burst into flames.

== 1964 ==
- September 13 – Farnborough Air Show (Farnborough, England) – Bristol Bulldog Mk.IIA G-ABBB/'K2227', registered in 1930, crashed at the SBAC Farnborough show. After several slow loops at low altitude, the engine cut out at the top of a loop, possibly due to magneto failure. The pilot had little chance of recovery and the aircraft crashed through the crowd barrier from the outside. The pilot, Ian Williamson, escaped with cuts and bruises.
- 9 May – Hamilton AFB, Marin County, California – United States Air Force Capt. Eugene J. Devlin was killed when Thunderbird 2, a Republic F-105B Thunderchief, 57-5801, delivered to the US Air Force Thunderbirds demonstration team in April 1964, suffered structural failure and disintegrated during 6G tactical pitch-up for landing after an air display. The failure of the fuselage's upper spine caused the USAF to ground all F-105s and retrofit the fleet with a structural brace. The air demonstration team reverted to the F-100 Super Sabre and never flew another show in F-105s.
- 3 May – Armed Forces Day exhibition (Bremerhaven, Germany) – Major Thomas Eugene Perfili, an American flight instructor attached to the West German Air Force, was killed when his Starfighter crashed after losing power while demonstrating rolls. He guided his plane away from spectators but was unable to eject.

== 1963 ==
- September 9 – Kent Air Display (Rochester, England) – Pilot Neville Browning suffered minor injuries following the crash of his Tiger Moth aircraft.
- July 21 – Caselle Airport, Turin, Italy – While skimming the ground during an airshow, Italian Air Force pilot Mario Pisano struck a parked automobile, veered into a crowd of people and finally struck an empty bus. The propeller killed one person and injured three, but Pisano was not injured in the crash.
- July 14 – Naval Air Display (Lossiemouth, Scotland) The pilot of a Gannet aircraft was unhurt following a crash landing caused by an engine failure.
- July 4 – Moline, Illinois – Skydiver John Talbott was killed and three others were injured when their plane crashed during takeoff, in rainy conditions, while heading to perform during Fourth of July festivities.

== 1962 ==
- October 2 – Public Air Display (Sydney Harbor, Australia) – Two De Havilland Sea Venoms of the Royal Australian Navy collided during an air display over the harbor. Lieutenant Albert 'Albie' Riley ejected from his aircraft at only 500 ft (150 m) and survived with minor injuries. His aircraft crashed into the water, close to what would be the site of the Sydney Opera House. The second Venom, piloted by Lieutenant B. Roberts, although badly damaged, managed to make it back to its base at Nowra.
- September 3 – National Air Show (Chino, California) – Stunt pilot Cliff Winters was killed when his engine failed during a roll.
- April 21 – Seattle World's Fair (Seattle, Washington) – Mr. and Mrs. Raymond Smith were killed in their residence after an F-102 fighter, part of the ten plane F-102 flyover during the opening ceremonies, suffered a flameout at 1,500 ft (460 m). The pilot safely ejected but the plane overshot Lake Washington, where the pilot intended to ditch the plane, and crashed in a residential neighborhood.

== 1961 ==
- September 24 – Wilmington, North Carolina – Three servicemen were killed and twelve survived when an Air Force C-123 Provider carrying members of the Army Golden Knights crashed and burned on take-off at an airshow.
- 17 September 17 - NAS Quonset Point, Rhode Island - A North American F-100C Super Sabre, a member of the USAF Thunderbird Aerial Demonstration Team, crashed at the NAS Quonset Point Air Show. The pilot safely ejected. [1] However, local Rhode Island newspapers do not cover an Air Show on the air station on the weekend of 9/10 September. The Thunderbirds were participating in another Air Show in Toledo, OH, that weekend. But the loss of a Thunderbird aircraft did occur: “An Air Force stunt pilot planned to take to the air in a spare plane today [18 September 1961] after his F-100 Super Sabre jet suffered a flame-out, crashed and burned during an attempted emergency landing. Capt. William J. Hosmer parachuted to safety Sunday when his jet’s engine failed while flying in formation with other members of the Thunderbirds precision team. The team was attempting to land at NAS Quonset Point after a cross-country flight from Dallas, TX. Hosmer’s plane cut a 200-foot path through the woods, exploded and burned. The pilot, whose parachute caught in a tree, was picked up by a volunteer fireman en route to the small woods fire touched off by the flaming wreckage.”[2] Rather than an Air Show, per se, the Thunderbirds were slated to stage an aerial exhibition over the Naval War College at Newport, RI, on Monday [18 September 1961].[3] ----[1] Joe Baugher’s Collection of Navy BuNos at https://www.joebaugher.com/navy_serials/navyserials.html [2] The Patriot Ledger (Quincy, Massachusetts), “Parachute Saves ‘Thunderbird’ Pilot As Plane Crashes,” September 18, 1961, Page 13. [3] The Standard Times (New Bedford, Massachusetts), “Thunderbird Pilot Safe In Jet Crash,” September 18, 1961, Page 9.
- June 3 – Paris Air Show (Paris, France) – A United States Air Force Convair B-58 Hustler, 58-2451, named The Firefly, crashed a few miles north of Paris. All three on board were killed.

== 1959 ==
- December 5 – Palm Desert, California – All four occupants of a twin engine Beechcraft Bonanza were killed after the tail section of their aircraft was sheared off in a mid-air collision with a single engine Beechcraft during an air show. The single engine Beechcraft crash landed, killing one occupant, severely injuring another and leaving a third occupant unharmed.
- April – Deniliquin Air Pageant (Denilquin, NSW, Australia) – A pilot was killed during an aerobatic display.

== 1958 ==
- August 2 – Clarence, NY Sesquicentennial Celebration (Buffalo Niagara International Airport, Buffalo, NY) – Blue Angel number 6, a Grumman F-11 Tiger piloted by Lt. John R. Dewenter, made an emergency landing at the airport before sliding into traffic outside the airport. He crashed after experiencing afterburner trouble while participating in the celebration. Lt. Dewenter was credited with saving many lives by landing at the Buffalo Niagara International Airport despite the runway being deemed too short for the plane to stop, as he was able to bring the plane down and stop without injury to others.
- September 20 – RAF Syerston, Nottinghamshire, UK – A prototype Avro Vulcan, VX770, performing in an airshow, suffered total collapse of the plane's right wing. The craft spiralled out of control and crashed, killing the entire aircrew and 3 people on the ground. VX770 was known to have had a weaker wing structure than production aircraft. The aircraft had been testing at the Rolls-Royce Conway installation and was returning from a test flight via Syerston.

== 1957 ==
- September 5 – Canadian International Air Show (Toronto, Ontario) – Royal Canadian Air Force Avro Canada CF-100 Mk.4B, 18455, pulled up, flamed out, went into inverted spin and crashed. Wing Commander H.R. Norris and First Officer R.C. Dougall were killed.
- July 20 – Burnaston Airport, Derby, England – A pilot was killed when his Miles Magister crashed during a display.
- June 8 – London, Ontario – A Royal Canadian Air Force Avro Canada CF-100 Mk.5 of No. 433 Squadron, North Bay, crashed after both wings separated from the aircraft. F/O's C.A. Sheffield and Les Sparrow died. Post crash film analysis suggested that the aircraft pulled more g's than it was designed for.
- June 7 – Hensley Field, Dallas, Texas, United States – Chance Vought Aircraft pilot James P. Buckner is killed while performing a high-speed flight demonstration in a Vought F8U-1 Crusader for a graduating class from the Naval Postgraduate School. Executing a zoom climb after his low-altitude pass, he apparently overstressed the fighter and it disintegrated before he could eject. The aircraft's wreckage violently exploded at low altitude over Main Street in adjacent Grand Prairie, Texas, inflicting minor injuries to several bystanders, and pieces of the fighter were scattered throughout the floodplain of the nearby Trinity River. Buckner's body was recovered a few hours after the crash.

== 1956 ==
- June 9 – RAFA Air Display at Shorts (Sydenham Airport, Belfast, Northern Ireland) – Shorts Senior Test Pilot Sqn Ldr Walter J. "Wally" Runciman, flying the fourth Short Seamew prototype, was killed when the aircraft "appeared to start a slow roll", the nose falling and there being "insufficient height for recovery". The aircraft avoided crashing into the crowd, hitting the runway "practically nose first".
- 22 May – Whitsun Air Display (Liverpool, England) – Parachutist and "Birdman" Leo Valentin fell to his death after his wooden wings were damaged after colliding with his jump plane and both of his parachutes failed to deploy.
- 19 May – Kinross AFB, Michigan – A Royal Canadian Air Force CF-100 Mk. 5 of 428 Squadron crashed after the starboard wing separated during a high-speed low-level pass during an air show. There was one RCAF and one USAF fatality.

== 1955 ==
- July 7 – Farnborough, England – The pilot of a Hawker Hunter was killed during an eighteen-plane flyby review witnessed by Princess Margaret and an estimated 4,000 spectators.
- 30 May – Akron–Canton Airport (Green, Ohio) – Pilot Paul Anderson was killed when his plane crashed while performing low altitude loops during an air show.
- 15 May – Air Display at Griffith, New South Wales, Australia – Two Hawker Sea Furies of the Royal Australian Navy were written off in a collision on the runway. Neither pilot was hurt in the incident.

== 1954 ==
- September 5 – National Aircraft Show (Dayton, Ohio) – Major John L. Armstrong was killed when he crashed his F-86H Sabre while trying to match or break the speed record he had set two days earlier.

== 1953 ==
- October 15 – Harewood Airport (Harewood, New Zealand) – Seven members of the Royal New Zealand Air Force were killed when two of their planes crashed following a mid-air collision during a ceremonial flyover.
- September 19 – Canadian International Air Show (Toronto, Ontario) – Royal Canadian Air Force Canadair Sabre 4, piloted by S/L W.R. Greene crashed into Lake Ontario. Greene, who had replaced the original pilot, Gordon Bennett, was killed. A T-33 formation team also performing in the show truncated their performance due to low cloud and rain and had entered clouds during looping maneuvers. One aircraft attempted loop recovery without sufficient altitude and hit Lake Ontario.
- September 19 – Battle of Britain Air Display (RAF Wyton, Cambridgeshire) – A Royal Air Force Gloster Meteor F.8, WA927, of 56 Squadron, broke up during a low-level run over the airfield. The pilot was killed.
- September 19 – Battle of Britain Air Display (RAF Coningsby, Lincolnshire) – A Royal Air Force Gloster Meteor F.8, WA836 of 74 Squadron, broke up during a high-speed run over the airfield. The pilot was killed and two women in the crowd were injured by debris.
- September 6 – National Aircraft Show (Dayton, Ohio, United States) – Marine pilot Major William T. Tebow was injured when the Sikorsky helicopter he was flying "brushed rotor blades" with another helicopter and crash-landed. Tebow was flying in formation when the accident occurred.
- 3 May – Venice, Italy – Parachutist Salvatore Cannarozzo was killed when his parachute failed to open after he jumped from a height of 9,000 ft (2,700 m) at an air show.

== 1952 ==
- October 19 – Barnes Municipal Airport, Westfield, Massachusetts – United States Air Force Pilots Lt. Robert H. Danell and Capt. Fred H. Stevens were killed when their F-86E Saberjets were involved in a mid-air collision while performing during an air show.

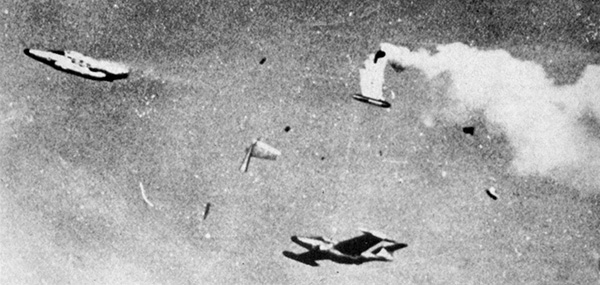
Northrop F-89 Scorpion disintegrating at Detroit, Michigan in 1952

- August 30 – International Aviation Exposition (Detroit, Michigan) – One of a pair of Northrop F-89 Scorpions disintegrated in flight during a display, killing the pilot, Korean War ace Donald E. Adams and his radar operator.
- September 6 – Farnborough Air Show (Farnborough, England) – Pilot John Derry and flight test observer Anthony Richards, flying a DH.110, were killed when the outer starboard wing, immediately followed by the outer port wing, broke off when the aircraft was pulled into a climb. The wreckage crashed into the spectators, killing 29 and injuring 60. The incident was captured on film.
- September 20 – Canadian International Air Show (Toronto, Ontario) – A Royal Canadian Air Force Avro Canada CF-100 Canuck Mk.3T, piloted by S/L R.D. Schultz, made a 500-knot high-speed pass with vertical pull up. This maneuver overstressed the aircraft but the aircraft recovered to CFB North Bay successfully.

== 1951 ==
- September 15 – Three separate accidents in the United Kingdom during Royal Air Force displays to celebrate the Battle of Britain:
  - Two of four Gloster Meteors of 63 Squadron collided during a formation aerobatic display at RAF Waterbeach, Cambridgeshire. One pilot, in WE869, was killed.
  - A pilot was killed at RAF Thornaby in North Yorkshire when his North American Harvard, FX428, crashed after the wing hit the ground while rolling the aircraft back from an inverted flypast.
  - A pilot was killed at RAF St Athan, Wales when his North American Harvard, KF937 crashed while landing after his display.
- September 15 – Fall Festival Day (Flagler, Colorado, United States) – Twenty people, including the pilot and 13 children, were killed when a Timm N2T Tutor training plane, piloted by Air Force 1st Lt. Norman Jones of Denver, flew in low over the crowd and attempted a loop. The pilot had reportedly arrived late and missed the safety briefing, which prohibited flying at less than 500 ft (150 m) above the ground and banned any stunts near the crowd. Lt. Jones was at an approximate altitude of 200 ft (61 m) when he began his maneuver. Depending on the account, the maneuver was either a loop or a slow roll.
- September 3 – Minnesota State Fair (St. Paul, Minnesota, United States) – Biplane pilot Carl Ferriss and his assistant Kitty Middleton, who was strapped to the upper wing, were killed when their plane failed to pull out of a power off dive.
- 7 May – Lexington Airport, Lexington, Oregon – Pilot Elmar Payne was killed when his Boeing-Stearman crashed while attempting a slow roll.

== 1950 ==
- October 29 – Norfolk Lions Club Airshow (Norfolk, Virginia) – Pilot Charles Edward Bailey was killed when the wing of his specially built 11.5 ft (3.5 m) long stunt plane struck the ground while attempting a low altitude roll.
- July 7 – Naval Air Station Patuxent River, Maryland – The third prototype of three Vought XF7U-1 Cutlass twin-tailed fighters, BuNo 122474, suffered an engine explosion during a flight exhibition. Vought test pilot Paul Thayer ejected and parachuted into two feet of water; the airframe landed on a Patuxent River island. Thayer was returned safely to the admiral's reviewing stand, where the show announcer asked "What will you do for an encore Mr. Thayer?" The pilot had fractured a small bone at the base of his spine – he later told Vought management that he was the only manager who actually "broke his ass for the Company."

== 1949 ==
- September 11 – Catskill Airport, New York – Pilot Earl Newton Jr. was killed when his aircraft stalled and nosedived while performing during an air show.
- August 14 – Lodgepole, Nebraska – Parachutist Jimmy F. Taylor was killed when his parachute failed to open after he jumped from a height of 600 ft (180 m) during an airshow.
- July 24 – Junior Chamber of Commerce air show (Sandusky, Ohio) – Lt. Richard H. Glenn received minor injuries when his F-80 Shooting Star crash-landed. The F-80's auxiliary wingtip fuel tanks collapsed when Lt. Glenn pulled out of a dive and he belly-landed the plane in a field.
- July 4 – Otesgo Airfield, Otsego, Michigan – former Navy flight instructor, John Jakus, was killed after his BT-13 Valiant crashed while performing a low-altitude roll during an air show performance.
- April 25 – Jackson, Mississippi – Pilot Billy Fischer was killed when his stunt plane lost a wing while performing during an air show.
- January 7 – All-American Air Show (Miami, Florida) – Air Force First Lt. James M. Hall was killed when his P-80 Shooting Star failed to pull up during a low altitude dive.

== 1948 ==
- September 27 – Hales Corners, Wisconsin – Aerial stuntman Dick Powell was killed after falling from an airplane while dangling from his knees over the leading edge of the wing. He was unable to pull himself back up onto the wing and the pilot was unable to fly to a nearby lake before he fell.
- September 22 – Spalding County Fair (Griffin, Georgia) – Pilot Charlie Rife was killed when his aircraft crashed while doing low altitude stunts. He was a member of an air circus that was part of the fair.
- September 19 – Randolph Air Force Base, Universal City, Texas – The pilot and co-pilot of an F-82 Twin Mustang were killed in a crash following a flyover of the airfield during an airshow.
- September 18 – RAF Manston, Kent, UK – An RAF de Havilland Mosquito crashed during an air show, killing both crew and ten members of the public.

== 1947 ==
- August 10 – Penn Yan Air Show (Penn Yan, New York) – Pilot Chester Rodney Angell was killed when his plane crashed shortly after taking off to participate in a balloon bursting contest during the air show.
- July 20 – Wilson-King Air Show (Twin Falls, Idaho) – Pilot Billy Lear Jr. escaped injury when he crash landed his P-38 after experiencing engine problems following a slow roll maneuver.
- July 13 – Sportmen's Pilot Air Show (Seaside, Oregon) – A stunt parachutist had to be rescued after being blown off course into the ocean.
- July 4 – Decorah Air Show (Decorah, Iowa) – Pilot and former WASP Marge Hurlburt was killed when her T-6 Texan crashed while performing a slow roll. At the time she was performing with the "Flying Tigers" aerial circus troupe.
- June 22 – Wilson-King Sky Show (St. George, Utah) – Sixteen-year-old spectator DeLores Woodbury was killed and two other spectators were injured when a Curtiss SB2C Helldiver involved with the airshow experienced brake failure on landing and crashed into cars parked at the edge of the airfield. The pilot, Bernadine Lewis King, was not seriously injured.
- June 4 – Veterans of Foreign Wars Airshow (Atlantic Beach, North Carolina) – A U.S. Marine Corps Vought F4U-4 Corsair crashed in the surf at Atlantic Beach, North Carolina during a VFW airshow. Pilot Lt. Gene Dial, of MCAS Cherry Point, North Carolina, walked some 15 ft (4.6 m) to shore unhurt. The pilot, with four and a half years of service, said that he had crashed once before during a carrier take-off.
- 18 May – Municipal Airport Air Show (Burlington, Iowa) – Lt. John Peeler was killed when his Navy F4U Corsair crashed into a sandlot baseball game and caught fire a few blocks from the airport. Two teenagers on the ground were killed and seven others were injured.

== 1946 ==
- November 10 – Tulsa Police Air Patrol Show (Tulsa, Oklahoma) – former Army Air Force instructor Wesley W. Cunningham was killed when his aircraft failed to pull out of a low altitude spin. At the time, Cunningham was involved in a skit, playing the part of a woman spectator who is chosen from the crowd to fly the airplane.
- September 16 – Twin Falls Air Show (Twin Falls, Idaho) – Four crew members were killed when their A-26 Invader crashed while performing a loop during a local airshow.
- September 15 – Flying Tiger Air Circus (Bowling Green, Ohio) – Army veteran Gordon Lahman was killed when his parachute failed to open during a 1,500-foot (460 m) delayed jump at the start of the circus.
- August 9 – North Montana State Fair (Great Falls, Montana) – Seven were killed when two A-26 Invader attack bombers, part of a low-flying three-plane formation, collided in mid-air 750 ft (230 m) away from a grandstand filled with 20,000 spectators. The wing from one bomber sheared off the tail section of another. The tail-less plane crashed into a horse barn, killing three crew members, three people on the ground and twenty thoroughbred horses; the other bomber managed to continue flying for either 1 or 5 miles (1.6 or 8.0 km) (sources differ) before crashing in a field, killing one of the crew. The third bomber in the formation landed safely.
- August 5 – Pittsburgh Airport, Pittsburgh, Pennsylvania – United States Army Air Forces pilot Major Leonard Weihardt suffered minor injuries when his jet fighter crashed during an air show.

== 1945 ==
- 27 May – Army Air Forces Fair (Wright Field, Dayton, Ohio) – The third prototype Curtiss XP-55 Ascender, 42-78847, crashed during an exhibition, killing the pilot William C. Glasgow and two to four civilians (sources differ) on the ground. The pilot attempted a slow roll after a low pass in formation with a P-38 and a P-51 on each wing, but lost altitude and crashed, sending flaming debris into occupied civilian vehicles on a highway near the airfield.

== 1944 ==
- July 23 – Spokane Air Show (Spokane, Washington) – Four United States Army Air Forces aviators, pilots Second Lt.'s William R. Scott and George Chrep, along with Capt. Ford K. Sayre and an unidentified sergeant, were killed when their two A-25 Shrike bombers were involved in a mid-air collision while ascending from a dive. A Paramount Pictures newsreel crew caught the accident on film, which was examined by the crash investigation board for clues to the accident. This footage was later incorporated into the 1956 film Earth vs. the Flying Saucers.

== 1943 ==
- September 4 – Defense Forces Public Air Display ( Flemington Racecourse, Melbourne, Australia) – A Royal Australian Air Force Vultee Vengeance became inverted at low level after pulling up from a mock bomb dive and went out of control. The aircraft crashed in a nearby industrial suburb, setting fire to a grain mill and narrowly missing a nearby crowded railway station. The plane's occupants, Flight-Lieutenant Richard Roe and his wireless air-gunner James Harris, were both killed. There were no casualties on the ground.
- August 1 – Lambert Field, St. Louis, Missouri, USA – Waco CG-4A-RO, 42-78839, built by St. Louis contractor Robertson Aircraft Corporation, lost its right-hand wing immediately after being released over the airfield by the tow airplane. Several thousand people had gathered to watch the first public demonstration of the St. Louis-built troop-carrying glider, which was carrying 2 USAAF crewmen, St. Louis mayor William D. Becker, Robertson Aircraft and Lambert Field co-founder Maj. William B. Robertson, and 6 other VIP passengers; all 10 perished in the ensuing crash. The accident was attributed to the failure of a defective wing strut fitting.
- 17 May – Waxahachie, Texas – Flight Instructor Lieutenant William S. Farrish and Sergeant Jasper J. DeMaria, Jr. were killed when their military trainer, from the Army Flying School in Waco, Texas, went into a spin and crashed during an air show.
- April 14 – Jervis Bay, New South Wales, Australia – Two Royal Australian Air Force Bristol Beauforts collided whilst pulling up from a dummy bomb run during an air display for war correspondents on board a nearby vessel. All eight crew on board the two aircraft were killed. A Fox Movietone News cameraman caught the incident on film.

== 1940 ==
- October 20 – Marianna Airshow (Marianna, Arkansas) – A parachutist and five people onboard a sightseeing plane were killed when the plane became entangled in the parachute. The plane had been circling the parachutist during his descent prior to the accident.

== 1939 ==
- July 10 – Brussels, Belgium – German Air Force Captain Wille was killed in a crash during a multi-country military aircraft display.
- January 14 – Havana Airdrome, Havana, Cuba – Captain Manuel Orta, a Cuban Army flier, was killed when his Curtiss Hawk failed to pull up from a high speed dive and crashed on top of a parked Beechcraft airplane.

== 1938 ==
- July 24 – Campo de Marte, Santa Ana, Usaquén, Colombia – A pilot performing an aerobatic display crashed a Curtiss Hawk II into a crowd attending a military review. Sources differ on the number killed and injured; up to 75 died and 100 or more were injured. According to Time magazine, the pilot, Flight Lt. Cesar Abadia of the Colombian Air Force, disregarded standing orders not to fly below 500 ft (150 m) and attempted to dive through a narrow gap between two grandstands. The pilot misjudged his approach and a wingtip hit the Diplomatic stand; the plane then smashed against the Presidential stand and exploded, raining flaming debris down on spectators located between the two grandstands.
- 1 May – Bonlee, North Carolina – Pilot Seldon Hunna was killed when he lost control of his plane while in a corkscrew spin and crashed into three parked cars.

== 1937 ==
- December 4 – Miami Air Show (Miami, Florida) – Rudy Kling and Frank Haines were killed in separate crashes, within seconds of each other, during a speed race. It was speculated that "Kling lost speed in a low altitude turn and Haines was caught in Kling's propeller wash", causing him to crash 150 yd (140 m) beyond Kling's wreckage.
- September 10 – King's Cup Race (Scarborough, England) — Wing Commanders P.C. Sherren and E.G. Hilton were both killed when their plane, a Miles M3A Falcon G-ENG, crashed en route from Hatfield Aerodrome during the race.
- September 4 – Cleveland Airport, Cleveland, Ohio – German Count Otto Hasenburg suffered minor injuries when the aircraft he was piloting crashed while flying inverted during an air show.
- June 27 – Westchester Airport, Armonk, New York – Parachutist Waldo Fraser was killed when his parachute failed to properly deploy during a demonstration jump.
- 29 May – Isle of Man Air Race (Hanworth, England) – Pilot S.W. Sparkes, his passenger and the occupant of a home were killed when his Percival Gull struck a home and burst into flames.
- 29 May – A number of separate accidents occurred in the United Kingdom during air displays to celebrate Empire Air Day:
  - Two pilots were killed at Farnborough, Hampshire when their Hawker Audax, K3066, crashed
  - One pilot was killed at Old Sarum when his Hawker Audax, K3698, stalled and crashed.
  - One pilot was killed at Tangmere, Sussex when his Hawker Fury K2086, spun in during the display.
  - One pilot was killed at Waddington, Lincolnshire when his Hawker Fury, K8228, crashed during a slow roll.
  - One pilot and three passengers were killed when an Airspeed Envoy, G-ACSZ, crashed during a pleasure flight at Doncaster.

== 1936 ==
- July 18 – Canfield Flying Circus (Noonan, North Dakota) – Pilot Dorotha Canfield and passenger Albert Lee were killed when their plane nosedived and crashed following an aborted landing attempt. It was undetermined whether Canfield or Lee, a former pilot, was in control of the dual control biplane at the time of the crash.

== 1935 ==
- November 22 – Roseboro, North Carolina – Parachutist Tommy Gibbons was killed when his chute opened late during a jump at an air circus.
- September 7 – Blackpool, England – While demonstrating formation flying, Captain Stewart's Avro passed underneath another plane and had its tail cut off by the other plane's propeller. He and two passengers, sisters Lillian and Dorothy Barnes, were killed in the crash.
- July 30 – Sir Alan Cobham's Air Circus (Huntingdonshire, England) – Pilot G.E. Collins was killed when his glider crashed after losing a wing during a demonstration.
- July 21 – Chambersburg, Pennsylvania – Pilot Herbert Foreman, along with passengers Glenn Calhoun and Charles Light, were killed when their aircraft went into a spin during an airport dedication show. The passengers had won their places on the flight by selling tickets to the show.
- 31 May – Woodford Aerodrome, Woodford, England – Parachutist Ivor Price was killed when his parachute failed to open during a two-person jump display.
- 18 May – Moscow, USSR – A giant propaganda plane, the Tupolev ANT-20, Maxim Gorky, crashed during a demonstration flight over Moscow. As a result of a poorly executed loop maneuver around the plane performed by an accompanying I-5 fighter, piloted by Nikolai Blagin, both planes collided. Forty-six people aboard both planes were killed.
- March 23 – Jackson, Mississippi – Pilot Herb Bassett was killed when his airplane failed to come out of a tailspin and his parachute became entangled in the aircraft when he tried to jump.

== 1934 ==
- August 28 – Warsaw, Poland – during an opening ceremony of the Challenge International de Tourisme 1934, a PZL P.7a fighter, piloted by Sgt. Dłuto, crashed into the ground while performing aerobatics at low altitude. The pilot was seriously injured.
- August 5 – Women's National Air Meet (Dayton, Ohio) – Pilot Frances Harrell Marsalis was killed when she lost control of her biplane while banking to avoid other aircraft during a race.
- July 1 – Hornell, New York – Pilot Merriell S. McHenry was killed when he bailed out of his plane at too low an altitude. His plane had stalled and entered a nosedive after a parachutist had successfully jumped from the plane.
- June 30 – RAF Hendon, London, UK – A Royal Air Force Hawker Hart, K2983, crashed during a display, killing the passenger.
- June 25 – Esseg, Serbia – Eight spectators were killed and thirteen injured when a stunt pilot was unable to recover from a dive and crashed into a crowd of spectators.
- 20 May – Wink, Texas – Pilot Harry Lynch and three passengers were killed when their aircraft struck power lines while stunting during an airport dedication ceremony.

== 1933 ==
- October 30 – Amarillo, Texas, United States – Four members of a flying circus troupe were killed after a mid-air collision. The planes were flying through streamers dropped by a third aircraft when the collision occurred.
- October 1 – Drogheda, Ireland – Captain K. Rose was killed and two passengers were injured while taking part in an air circus.
- September 25 – Newport, Vermont – Parachutist Robert Keating was killed when he misjudged his jump height and struck the water at Derby Pond before a crowd of 3,000 spectators.
- July 4 – Century of Progress World's Fair (Chicago, Illinois) – Parachutist Joe Wilson was killed when he failed to open his parachute during a nighttime jump while a fireworks display was occurring. It was speculated that he may have been knocked unconscious during the jump.
- June 18 – Essey, France – An aircraft crashed during aerobatics at a hangar during a flying display, killing the pilot and one spectator and injuring 40 others.
- 27 May – Welland Municipal Airport, Welland, Ontario, Canada – Parachutist Elsie Storrow was killed when she delayed deploying her parachute during a demonstration jump as part of the dedication ceremonies for the airport.
- 13 May – American Air Races (Oklahoma City, Oklahoma) – Pilot Art Killips was killed when his aircraft stalled and crashed while performing multiple snap roll maneuvers.

== 1932 ==
- September 5 – Cleveland National Air Races (Cleveland, Ohio) – Pilot Al Wilson was killed when he was involved in a collision with an autogyro while performing stunts. John Miller, the pilot of the autogyro, was injured but his passenger was uninjured.
- August 7 – Fairfax Municipal Airport, Kansas City, Kansas – Pilot Mildred Kauffman was killed when her plane was involved in a mid-air collision in which the wings of both aircraft struck and locked together during an opposite direction flyby. Both planes crashed from an approximate height of 75 ft (23 m). Don Moss, the pilot of the other plane, along with his passenger and Kauffman's passenger were not injured.
- 22 May – American Legion Air Circus (Delano, California, United States) – Pilot Fred Larson, flying the sister ship of the Spirit of St. Louis, was killed and passenger William Simmons was injured after their plane lost altitude while making a turn. The plane's wing struck the ground, causing the plane to flip over and burst into flames.
- October 5 – National Aviation Day Display (Plompton, Yorkshire, England) – An Avro 504K, G-AAUJ, crashed while performing an aerobatic display, killing one of the two passengers.

== 1931 ==
- June 13 – Cambridge Airport, UK– An Avro Avian, G-AAHJ, crashed during an air display, killing the pilot. The starboard wing broke up during a steep dive.
- 17 May – Omaha, Nebraska – Pilot Charles W. "Speed" Holman was killed while performing before a crowd of 20,000 spectators at the opening of a new airport.
- April 30 – Lynchburg, Virginia – Pilot Clarence M. Ellicock was killed when the aileron on his plane loosened while performing a demonstration during the dedication ceremonies of the municipal airport.

== 1930 ==
- November 2 – Preakness, New Jersey – Pilot Alden H. Russell was injured and his passenger was killed when his aircraft went into a tailspin and crashed while stunting before a crowd of 5,000 at the local airport.
- September 18 – Stuttgart, Germany – Acrobat Fritz Schindler, along with three pilots, were killed when two planes crashed while attempting to transfer Schindler from one plane to the other via a rope ladder.
- September 14 – Binghamton, New York – Sixteen year old Ciara Lechner was killed while attempting her first parachute jump at an air circus. Neither chute opened and the professional parachutist on board failed to follow her after she left the plane.
- August 28 – Iowa State Fairgrounds, Des Moines, Iowa – Four people were critically injured when two aircraft were involved in a mid-air collision while stunting. One of the crafts crash landed on a tent and the other was able to land.
- August 27 – National Air Races (Chicago, Illinois) – Navy pilot Lieutenant J.P. Deshazo was killed when he lost control while attempting a barrel roll during a 50-mile (80 km) speed race with 16 Navy planes. He crashed in front of the bleachers, killing concessionaire Louis Weiner. Seven others were injured, either by shrapnel from the exploding fuel tank or burning oil from the aircraft.
- July 11 – Michigan Cherry Festival (Traverse City, Michigan) – Pilot Lieutenant A.H. Coleman was killed and passenger George Watson was seriously injured when their aircraft failed to pull out of a dive while performing stunts.
- July 4 – Neosho Airport (Neosho, Missouri) – During a wing walking performance, an unidentified pilot and wing walker were killed when the wing collapsed on their aircraft, sending it into a tailspin.
- 30 May – Memorial Day display (Arnettsville, West Virginia) – Pilots Loren Scott and Everett Arnholtt were killed after colliding with a tree during a memorial day flying display.
- April 27 – Fayetteville, Tennessee – At least nine air show spectators were killed and about twenty injured when pilot Milton P. Covert's plane lost altitude and crashed while approaching the landing area. The victims were standing on a railroad embankment as the plane approached at a low altitude. At the time, there were claims that the pilot was deliberately trying to scare the spectators off the embankment. The pilot and his two passengers escaped unhurt, but Covert was later arraigned on charges.
- April 27 – Düsseldorf, Germany – Aerial acrobat Willy Hundertmark was killed while attempting a plane change over via a rope ladder while in flight. After successfully getting on the ladder dangling from the upper plane, he became entangled and couldn't ascend. After 45 minutes, the pilot attempted a low speed landing and dragged Mr Hundertmark "over a long stretch of the field".
- March 30 – Buffalo Airport, Cheektowaga, New York – Pilot Mildred Kaufmann parachuted safely after being ejected from her aircraft while performing loops. She was using a borrowed aircraft at the time and not her modified craft that she normally used due to her small stature. The unoccupied plane crashed near a hangar at the airport.

== 1929 ==
- November 11 – Marlborough, Massachusetts – Lieutenant William P. Leonard was killed when his aircraft nosedived and crashed while performing stunts with a second aircraft before a crowd of 7,000.
- October 7 – Cross Keys Airport, Altoona, Pennsylvania, United States – A parachutist was killed when his parachute failed to open while putting on a display in front of a crowd of 1,000 persons.
- October 7 – Keystone Airport, Johnstown, Pennsylvania, United States – A pilot was killed while attempting a low altitude barrel roll. His plane went into a tail spin and crashed into a swamp.
- July 27 – Cohoes Airport Carnival (Cohoes, New York) – Pilot G.H. Perin was injured when his aircraft failed to recover from a low altitude dive while involved in a balloon popping contest.

== 1928 ==
- November 11 – Pocatello Airport, Pocatello, Idaho – Pilot Harry McDougall and passenger Elda Rice were killed when their aircraft went into a tailspin during an air race.
- October 11 – Hendon, England – RAF Lieutenant Somerville and Corporal Loud were killed during an air force exhibition when their aircraft lost its tail during a low altitude flyby. The Sultan of Muscat was in attendance at the time of the accident.
- August 12 – Heerlerheide, The Netherlands – German pilot Philip Gesper had engine trouble with his Dietrich DP.II during a flight exhibition and struck the grandstand, killing 5 spectators and wounding over 20.
- June 28 – Vincennes Fair (Vincennes, France) – Pilot Alfred Fronval was killed when his aircraft struck a parked military aircraft while landing.
- 5 May – Dayton, Ohio – Pilot Harold J. Forshay and his two passengers, Walter Clark and Blair Cross, were killed when their plane crashed while performing stunts in front of hundreds of spectators.
- February 15 – Southeastern Air Derby (Macon, Georgia) – Pilot Buck Steel and passenger Francis Ashcraft were killed when an explosive device that was thrown from their plane detonated prematurely, either killing them instantly or rendering them unable to control the plane that then crashed in town, killing a pedestrian. Eight others on the ground were injured, either from the plane crash or the collapse of a sidewalk near the crash site.

== 1927 ==
- November 21 – Santa Monica, California – Parachutist Miss Jean West escaped uninjured following a parachute demonstration accident. Her parachute became entangled on the wing following her jump but the pilot was able to safely land while dragging Miss West several hundred feet.
- September 12 – Gates Flying Circus (Poughkeepsie, New York) – While performing loops above the city, a loose chain fell from the stunt plane's cockpit and crashed through the roof of a local theatre, landing on the stage.
- July 4 – Preston's Field, Amenia, New York – Pilot William Cooke and passenger Thomas Moawood were injured when their Curtiss Jenny scout plane crashed while performing stunts from an approximate height of 300 ft (91 m).

== 1926 ==
- August 15 – Atlanta, Georgia – Parachutist Jimmy Calhoun was killed when he lost his grip on his parachute at too high an altitude, while preparing to dive into a lake at an amusement park as 10,000 spectators watched.
- 24 May – Chariton, Iowa – Spectator M.H. Johnson was killed and trapeze performer Eva Murphy was injured during a stunt demonstration. Mr. Murphy was trying to remove Mr. Johnson's hat during a low altitude flyby while hanging from an airplane mounted trapeze. Mr. Johnson was struck and died from a head injury.
- April 18 – Vero, Florida – Volunteer performer Jewell Bell was killed after leaping from a low flying plane, at approximately 50 ft (15 m), into the ocean during an air circus performance.

== 1925 ==
- August 23 – Baer Municipal Aviation Field, Fort Wayne, Indiana – Pilot H. Huntley was struck by the propeller of the aircraft he was attempting to start. Huntley was knocked unconscious and suffered a fractured shoulder in the mishap.
- June 7 – American Legion Flying Circus (Cape Girardeau, Missouri) – Passengers Grace Lamar and Pearl Baysinger were killed when pilot John Hunter's plane crashed into a tree and burned.

== 1924 ==
- October 12 – Wichita, Kansas – Parachutist Ruth Garver was killed when her parachute failed to open during a performance before a crowd of 10,000 spectators.
- October 8 – Virginia State Fair (Richmond, Virginia) – Pilot Russell Simon was killed following a mid-air collision with another plane during an exhibition flight. His plane crashed into the roof of a building on the fairground and he was ejected from the plane.
- October 4 – National Air Races (Dayton, Ohio) – Captain Burt Skeel, flying a Curtis racing plane, was killed when the wings of his plane buckled prior to his start in the race.
- March 23 – Jacksonville, Florida – Stunt woman Mabel Cody was injured after she fell from an airplane while attempting to transfer to the plane from a speeding automobile.
- March 3 – San Antonio, Texas – Pilot Bertha Horchem was killed when her plane crashed while performing with an air circus group in front of 3,000 spectators. The left wing of her plane collapsed while performing a loop at approximately 1,200 ft (370 m).

== 1923 ==
- November 18 – Kelly Field, Texas – The first aerial refueling-related fatality occurred when the fuel hose becomes entangled in the right wings of the refueler and the receiver aircraft. The Army Air Service pilot of the refueler, Lt. P. T. Wagner, flying DH-4B 23–444, was killed in the ensuing crash.

== 1922 ==
- October 13 – Cleveland, Tennessee – Stuntwoman Eva Moss was killed after the plane she was hanging from was forced to land. She had performed a stunt that involved hanging by her teeth from a rope ladder and was either unable or unwilling to climb back into the aircraft. The pilot then flew low over a lake and signaled her to drop into the water but she did not follow his directions. The pilot was then forced to land, which caused the fatal injuries to Ms. Moss.
- September 23 – Mitchel Field, Mineola, New York – A Martin NBS-1 bomber, AS-68487, piloted by Raymond E. Davis, nose dived and crashed onto a residential street from an estimated altitude of 500 ft (150 m), killing the six military personnel on board. At the time, the plane was involved in a night time war game display that was lit by searchlights and watched by an estimated crowd of 25,000 spectators.
- September 7 – Rutland, Vermont – Pilot Lieutenant Belvin Maynard, along with mechanic Charles Mionette and passenger Lieutenant I. R. Wood, were killed when their plane nosedived while attempting a tailspin at a low altitude. Parachutist Henry A. "Daredevil" Smith was killed a few hours later when his parachute failed to properly deploy.
- August 19 – Brattleboro, Vermont – Passengers Evelyn Harris, James Trahan and Trahan's five-year-old son were killed when the stunt aircraft that they were passengers in crashed after striking a tree during takeoff, during the dedication ceremonies for a new airport.
- August 15 – Puck, Poland – During a bombing show, an observer prematurely dropped a bomb from a Lübeck-Travemünde F.4 floatplane into spectators, killing 13 persons and injuring 34.
- June 17 – Louisville, Kentucky – Army airmen Lieutenant Robert O. Hanley (also reported as Robert E. Hanley) and Sergeant Arthur Opperman were killed when their DH.4 crashed while making a sharp banking turn. The airframe was destroyed by the post-crash fire. The men were airborne to photograph the airshow that was to shortly begin. The aircraft was assigned to the 7th Photo Section at Godman Field, Camp Knox, Kentucky.
- 21 May – Presidio, San Francisco, California – Stuntman Wesley May was fatally injured during a parachute jump. He misjudged his altitude and released himself from his parachute to avoid hitting a tree. Wesley fell approximately 50 ft (15 m), struck a tombstone in a cemetery and died in an army hospital.
- February 22 – San Jose, California – Parachutist Thorton "Jinx" Jenkins was killed when his parachute partially opened during a jump at an air circus.
- January 22 – Askersund, Sweden – Parachutist Elsa Andersson was killed when her parachute failed to open during a jump.

== 1921 ==
- October 4 – Long Branch, New Jersey – Miss Madeline Davis, a twenty-three-year-old professional stunt flier, was killed while attempting to become the first woman to transfer from a moving automobile to an airplane flying overhead via a rope ladder. She died shortly after losing her grip on the ladder and striking the ground while traveling at approximately 45 mph (72 km/h).
- September 24 – State Fairgrounds, Oklahoma City, Oklahoma – Lieutenant Arthur Emerson was killed while attempting to transfer from one aircraft to another mid-flight.
- September 24- St. Louis Dispatch Flying Circus (Bemidji, Minnesota) – Pilot Edward Fox and passenger John Harris were injured when their plane crashed when it failed to recover while performing a nosedive.
- June 10 – Huntington Beach, California – One person was killed and eight were injured when an airplane that was performing stunts crashed into a group of spectators on the beach.
- June 5 – Curtiss Field, Mineola, New York – Stunt pilot Laura Bromwell was killed after her aircraft went into a tailspin and crashed when her plane's engine quit while performing loop-the-loops.
- June 5 – Salisbury Beach, Massachusetts – Parachutist Jack "Daredevil Jack" Murphy drowned after landing in the ocean far from shore during a demonstration with a crowd of thousands watching.
- 30 May – Wisconsin State Fairgrounds, Milwaukee, Wisconsin – Sixteen people were injured when a stunt plane crashed while performing a stunt that involved the transfer of a person from an airplane to moving automobile via a ladder. The ladder became hooked on the automobile's exhaust pipe, lifted the vehicle's rear end and threw it out of control. The airplane was heading toward the grandstand area when the pilot swung the plane and crashed it into the spectator boxes lining the track area.
- 15 May – Grand Island, Nebraska – Stunt pilot Warren P. Kite was killed following a mid-air collision in which the tail section of his aircraft was severed by an aircraft piloted by J.H. Smith, who escaped injury.

== 1920 ==
- September 18 – New York State Fair (Syracuse, New York) – Stuntman "Tex" McLauglin was injured when he was struck by the propeller of an aircraft while transferring mid-air from one aircraft to another via a rope ladder. He was able to hold onto the ladder while the aircraft landed and was dragged approximately 100 ft (30 m) before the aircraft was able to stop.
- September 3 – Sonoma County Fair (Santa Rosa, California) – Pilot Leon Ferguson was killed when his plane went into a tailspin while he was performing a stunt in which he hung by his toes off one of the wings of the plane.
- July 5 – Dundalk Flying Field, Baltimore, Maryland – The field was almost immediately renamed to Logan Field when Army Lt. Patrick H. Logan was fatally injured after his Nieuport 28, F6506, nicknamed the "Red Devil," of the 104th Observation Squadron, crashed at the airport's inaugural air show following a stall/spin. In response to the tragedy, the airfield was renamed in his honor, with the announcement of the new name being made at the closing ceremonies of the airshow during which he died.
- February 2 – Tampa, Florida – Stuntman "Freddie" Owens was injured when his right foot was severed by a propeller while transferring mid-air from one aircraft to another.

== 1919 ==
- August 23 – Warsaw, Poland – Two crewmen, including aircraft builder Karol Słowik, were killed during a ceremonial public flight in front of Polish chief-of-state Marshal Józef Piłsudski. The plane, the first aircraft built in a newly independent Poland, was a copy of a Hannover CL.II and crashed due to faulty cabling.
- August 15 – Patterson Park, Baltimore, Maryland – While performing aerial stunts, a military aircraft crash landed through a fence and into a baseball diamond, killing three children and injuring a number of others.
- July 17 – Americus, Georgia – Sergeant Gordon Gates, of the Army Air Services, was killed when his safety belt failed while he was flying inverted during an air circus. His plane continued flying unmanned for a half a mile before finally crashing.

== 1916 ==
- June 25 – Oshkosh Fairgrounds, Oshkosh, Wisconsin – Charles Franklin Niles, an early aviator who had been taught by Glenn Curtiss in 1913, crashed while flying a loop maneuver in his Moisant monoplane when a wing collapsed. He died of his injuries the next day. It was stated in his obituary that he was the first to fly around the Statue of Liberty, and that he served as an aviator in the 1910–1920 Mexican Revolution. A witness to the crash was cartoonist Robert Osborn.

== 1915 ==
- October 25 – Panama–Pacific International Exposition (San Francisco, California) – Pilot Charles Niles was injured when he crashed while landing during an exhibition flight.
- September 22 – Colorado State Fair (Pueblo, Colorado) – Parachutist Eddie Coy was killed when his parachute malfunctioned after he jumped from a balloon at a height of 1,800 ft (550 m).
- March 14 – San Francisco, California – Famed aerialist Lincoln Beachey, performing at the Panama–Pacific International Exposition before a crowd of at least 50,000 onlookers, attempted the first exhibition of inverted flight in a monoplane. Beginning the stunt only 2,000 ft (610 m) above the waters of San Francisco Bay, Beachey pulled sharply on the controls to resume level flight, but the resulting pressure on the wing spars caused them to snap and the plane plunged into the water. Beachey survived the crash itself but later drowned, as rescuers were unable to extract him for nearly two hours.

== 1914 ==
- April 19 – Buc, Normandy, France – Two monoplanes collided, resulting in two people being seriously injured and two being killed. André Bidot and his passenger Mr. Pellato, collided with the aeroplane flown by François Deroye and passenger Mr. Dablin at around 16:30. A third aircraft taking part in the chase, piloted by a Mr. Coendett, was not involved in the collision and landed safely. Deroye's aircraft caught fire and both he and Mr. Dablin perished in the flames. Bidot's aircraft crashed relatively intact, but caught fire after impact, seriously injuring Bidot and Mr. Pellato.
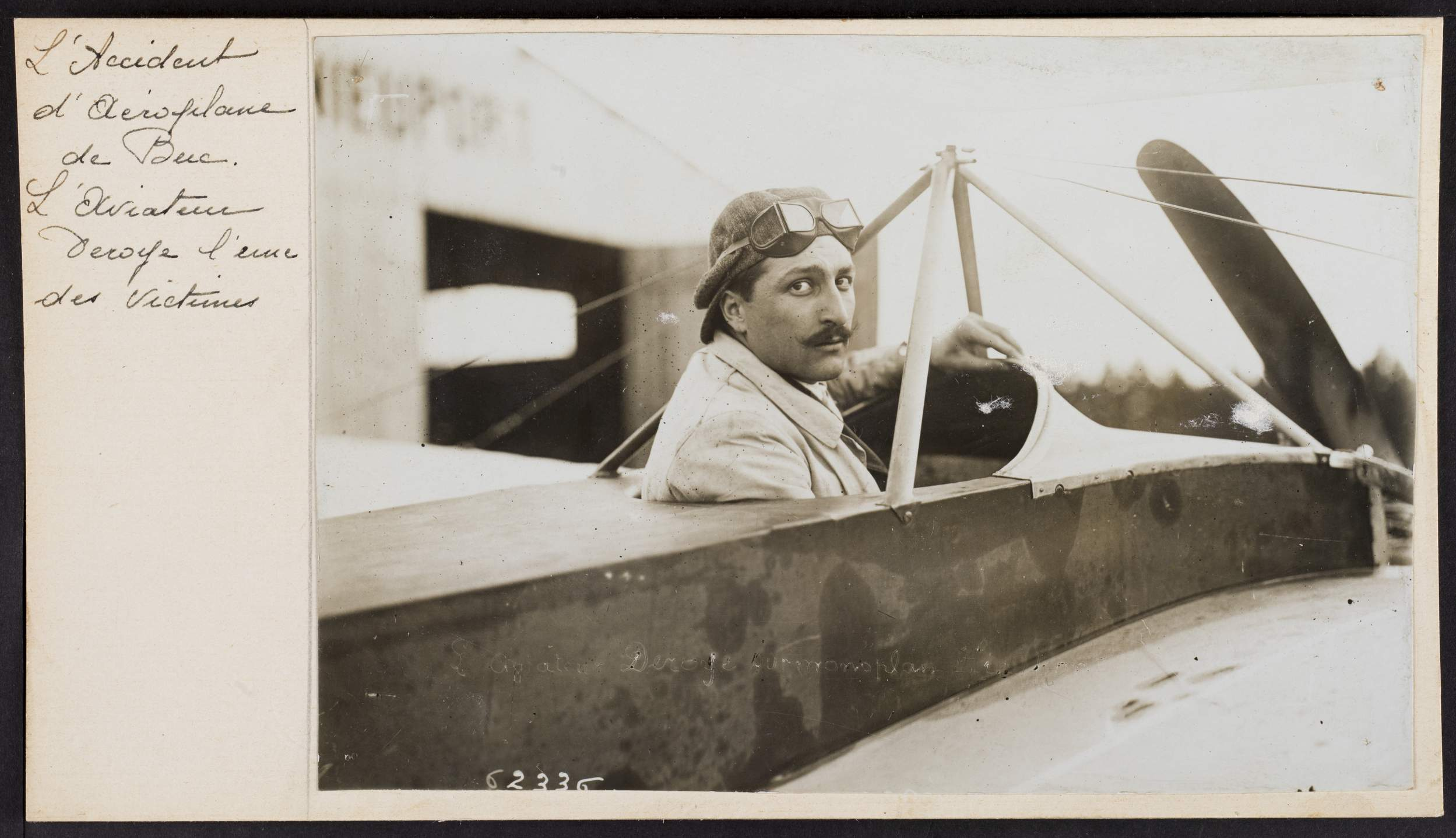
Aviator Deroye

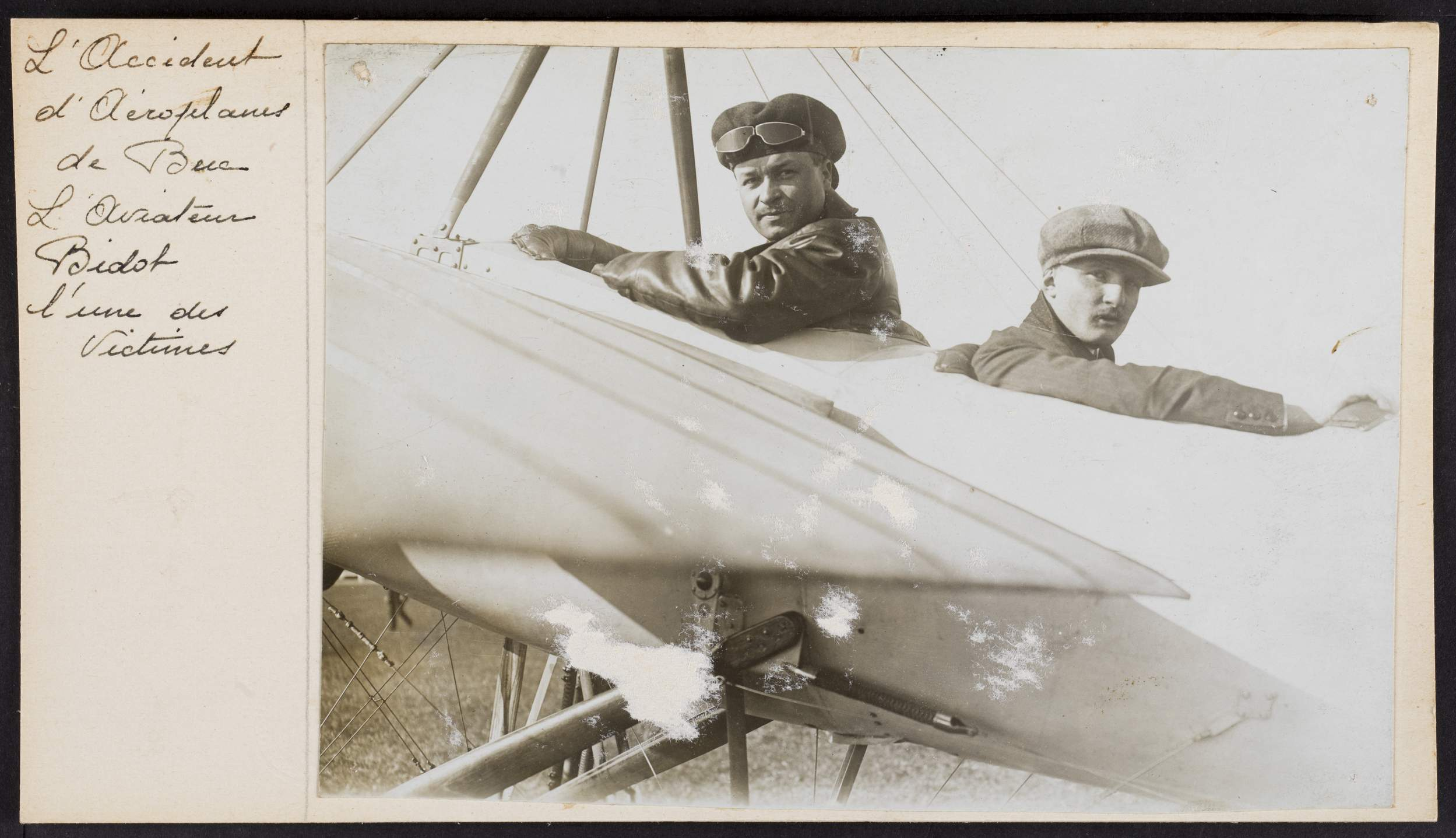
Aviator Bidot and passenger

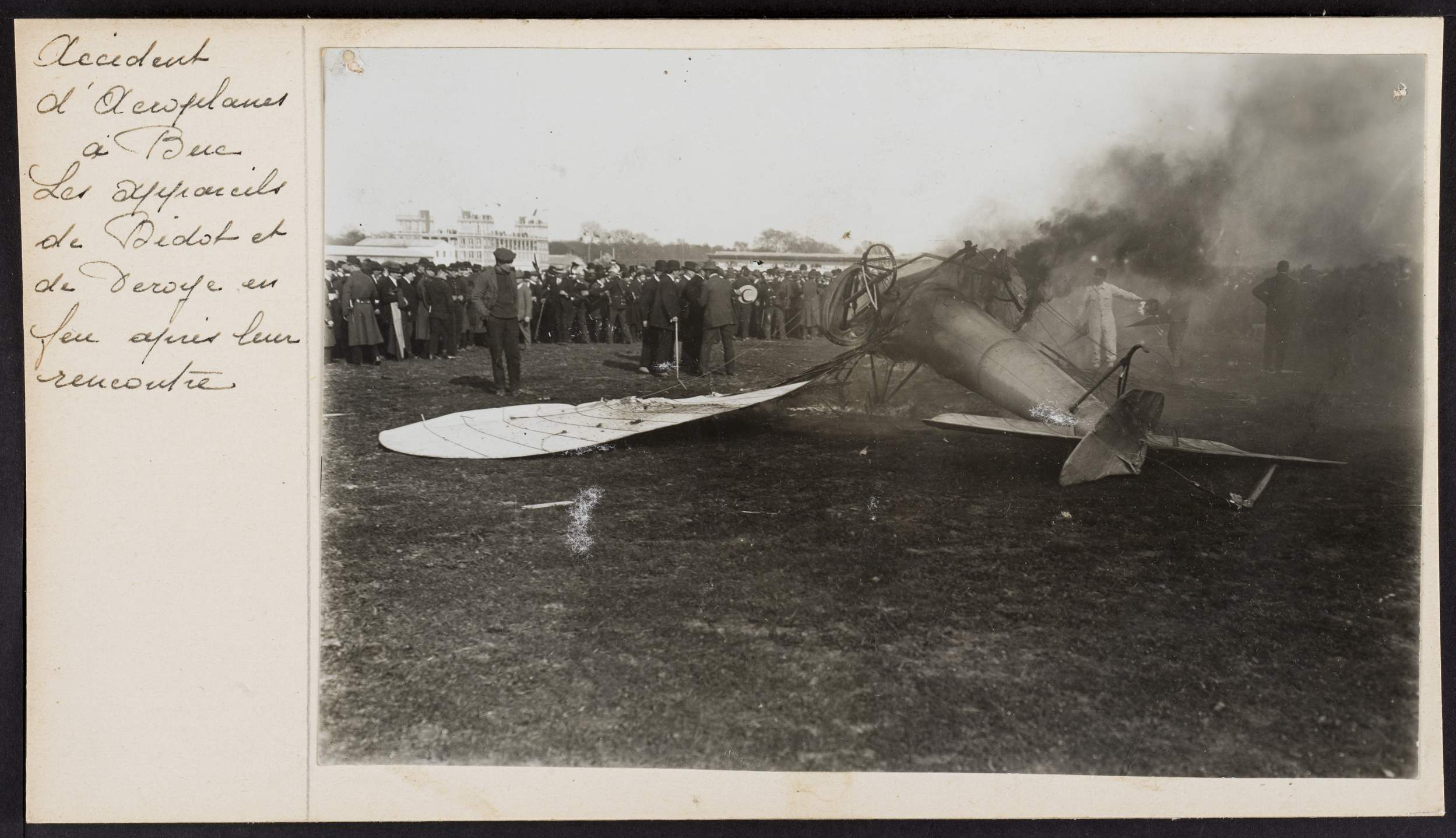
Bidot plane

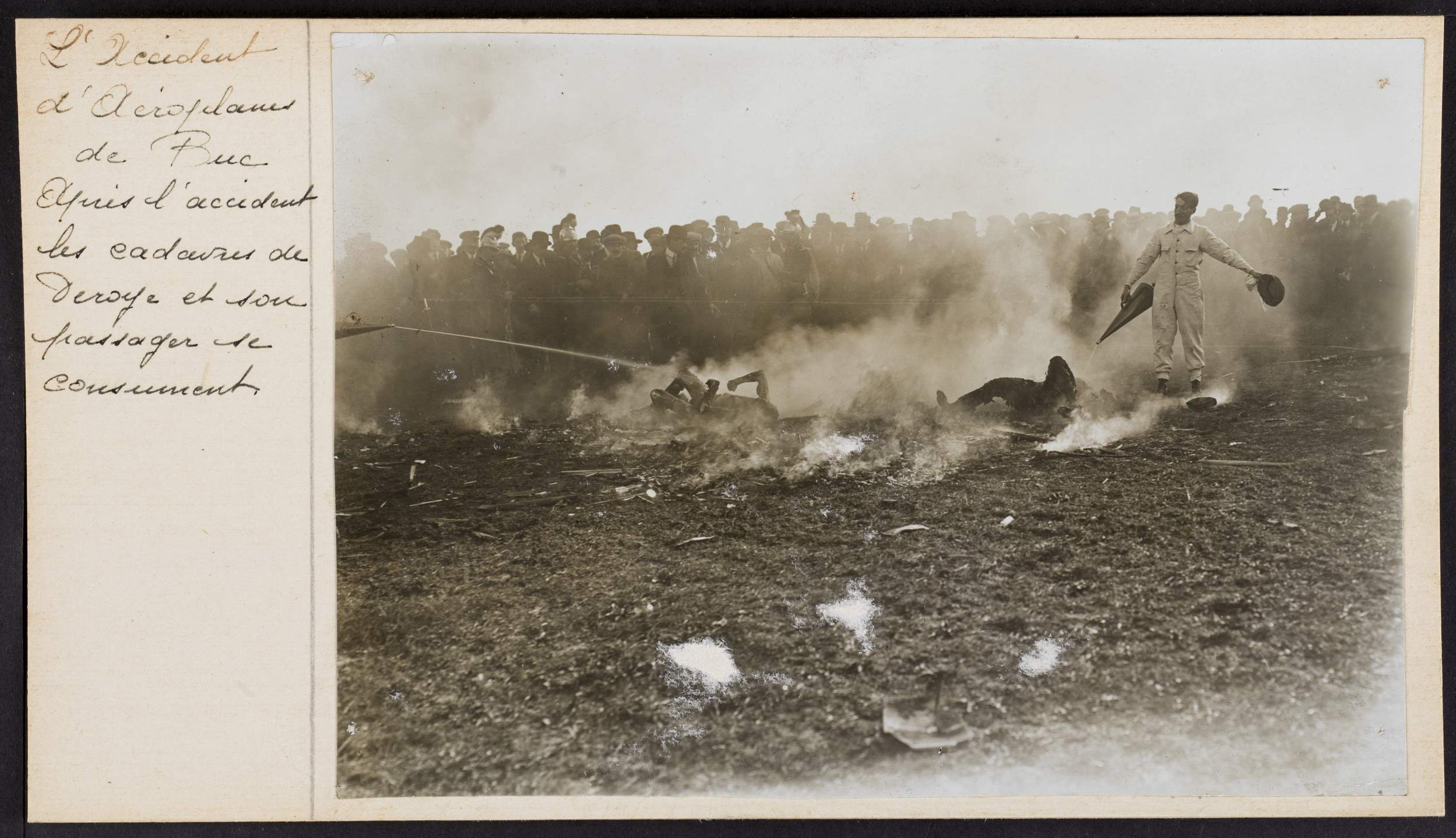
Deroye plane and victims
- September 16 – State Fairgrounds, Pueblo, Colorado – Aviator Weldon B. Cooke was killed when his aircraft stalled and crashed from a height of 2,000 ft (610 m) during an exhibition flight.

== 1913 ==
- October 7 – Hammondsport, New York – One spectator was killed and several injured when they were knocked off a roof by the wing of an aircraft piloted by Lincoln J. Beachey. He escaped injury when he crashed following the accident.
- October 1 – Randolph County Fairgrounds, Elkins, West Virginia – Pilot Irving Conley, along with several spectators, were injured when his aircraft fell from a height of 50 ft (15 m).
- October 1 – Binghamton Industrial Exposition (Binghamton, New York) – Pilot Earl V. Fritts escaped injury when he glided his aircraft to earth following the failure of his propeller and crankshaft while flying at an altitude of 500 ft (150 m).
- September 25 – Mesa County Fair (Grand Junction, Colorado) – Pilot H.W. Blakely suffered minor injuries when his aircraft crashed following an engine stall while he was flying at a height of 85 ft (26 m).
- September 9 – Carmi, Illinois – Pilot Tony Jannus escaped injury when he landed his aircraft after the carburetor fell off his engine while flying at an altitude of 900 ft (270 m) during an exhibition flight.
- August 6 – Carnival Week (Victoria, British Columbia, Canada) – Pilot Johnny Bryant was killed when his aircraft crashed during an exhibition flight at the water carnival celebrations.
- July 19 – Golden Potlatch (Seattle, Washington) – Parachutist Francis L. Thayer was killed when his parachute harness broke at a height of 600 ft (180 m) and he fell into the Puget Sound.

== 1912 ==
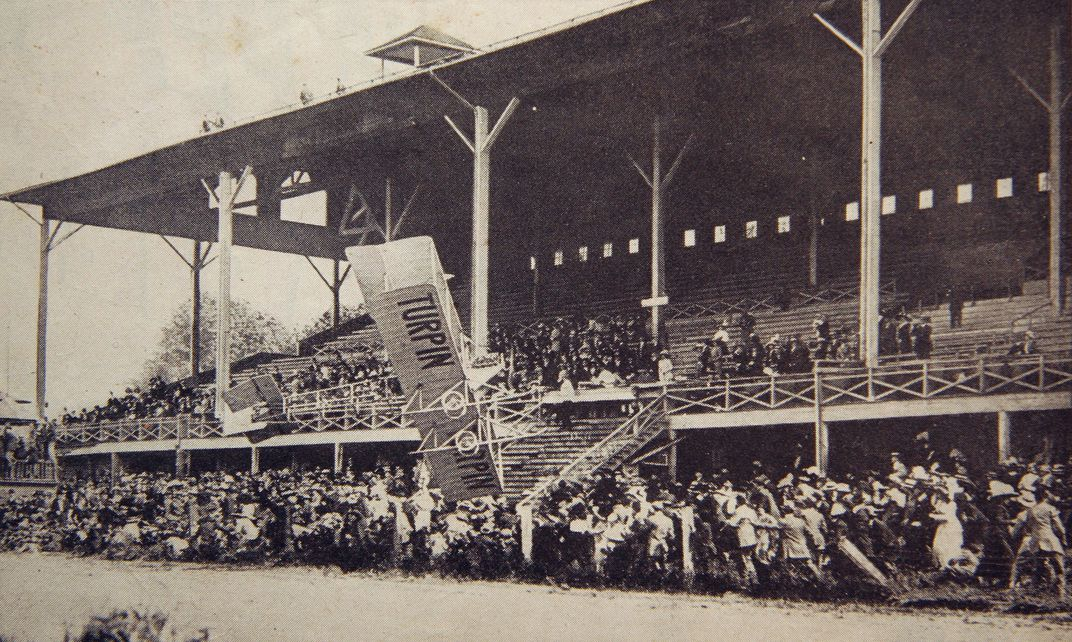
Clifford Turpin's crash on May 30, 1912

- September 20 – Cicero Aviation Field, Chicago, Illinois – Pilot Howard W. Gill was killed and pilot George Mestach injured when their aircraft were involved in a mid-air collision during a race.
- September 8 – Gray, Haute-Saône, France – Four spectators were killed and ten injured when an out of control aircraft crashed into a crowd.
- August 23 – Prowers County Fair (Lamar, Colorado) – Pilot George Thompson was killed when his aircraft struck a tree on takeoff and he was crushed by falling debris.
- July 20 – Columbia Park, Buffalo, New York – Pilot W. F. Zehler escaped with minor injuries when he was ejected from his aircraft after it struck a fence during a failed takeoff attempt before a crowd of 2,000.
- July 1 – Third Annual Boston Aviation Meet (Squantum, Massachusetts) – Pilot Harriet Quimby, the first woman in the United States to receive a pilots license, and her passenger, event organizer William A.P. Willard, were killed when they were ejected from their aircraft when it suddenly pitched forward at an altitude of 1,000 ft (300 m).
- 30 May – Meadows Race Track, Seattle, Washington – Two spectators and pilot J. Clifford Turpin were killed, and more than a dozen people were injured, when a photographer stepped in front of Turpin's aircraft during his takeoff run. Turpin swerved to avoid the photographer but his aircraft's wing struck a pole and pivoted the craft into the grandstands.
- 14 May – London, England – Pilot E.V. Fisher and passenger Victor Lewis Mason were killed when their aircraft went out of control. Mason was ejected from the aircraft mid-air and Fisher died in the wrecked craft that had caught fire.
- January 22 – Third International Aviation Meet (Carson, California) – Pilot Rutherford Page was killed when he lost control of his aircraft at a height of 150 ft (46 m) and either jumped or fell from the craft when it was at a height of 60 ft (18 m).

== 1911 ==
- October 19 – Macon, Georgia – Eugene Burton Ely was late pulling out of a dive and crashed. Ely jumped clear of the wrecked aircraft, but his neck was broken, and he died a few minutes later. Spectators picked the wreckage clean looking for souvenirs, including Ely's gloves, tie and cap.
- October 11 – Joplin, Missouri – James Robert Kenney, an exposition visitor, was killed when attempting to pass in front of a biplane. Kinney crossed the path of the plane just an instant before it began to leave the ground; a corner of the elevator struck him under the chin, breaking his neck and killing him almost instantly. Darold Robinson (the pilot) reversed his engines when he saw Kinney turn directly in his path, but it was already too late. Robinson was preparing to give a demonstration and exhibition flights when the tragedy occurred.
- October 2 – Interstate Fairgrounds, Spokane, Washington – Pilot Cromwell Dixon, the youngest licensed aviator at the time, was killed after his plane crashed after encountering a downdraft.
- August 16 – 1911 Chicago International Aviation Meet (Chicago, Illinois) – Pilot Arthur Stone escaped injury when his Queen Monoplane crashed in Lake Michigan. Pilot Howard Gill was not injured when his Baby Wright aircraft crashed while landing during the same event.
- August 15 – 1911 Chicago International Aviation Meet (Chicago, Illinois) – Two pilots were killed in separate accidents on this day. William R. Badger was killed when his aircraft's wings collapsed while in a dive and pilot St. Croix Johnstone was killed when his aircraft experienced engine failure and crashed into Lake Michigan.
- 23 May – Strassberg, Germany – Aviator Laemmlin was killed when he fell from a height of 200 ft (61 m) during an aeroplane competition.
- 21 May – Paris to Madrid Air Race (Paris, France) – The French Minister of War Henri Maurice Berteaux was killed, and aviation patron Henri Deutsch de la Meurthe, Prime Minister of France Ernest Monis and Monis' son were injured when an aircraft lost power and crashed into a group of spectators at the start of the race.
- 20 May – Kursk, Russia – One hundred spectators were injured when an aircraft crashed into a crowd.
- January 10 – Aviation Field, San Francisco, California – Pilot Hubert Latham escaped injury when his Antionette monoplane encountered strong winds and crashed into a fence.

== 1910 ==
- December 29 – Aviation Field, Los Angeles, California – Pilot Glenn Martin escaped injury when his aircraft was blown into a fence while landing at the end of the meet. He was trying to qualify for his pilot's license at the time of the crash.
- November 22 – Register Aviation Meet (Mobile, Alabama) – Pilot J.D.A. McCurdy escaped injury following a crash when his aircraft's wing struck the ground.
- November 17 – Reno Air Meet (Reno, Nevada) – Pilot Fred Wiseman escaped injury when his plane crashed shortly after takeoff, missing the grandstand and crash landing in an irrigation ditch.
- November 17 – Denver Aviation Meeting (Denver, Colorado) – Pilot Ralph Johnstone, world record holder for highest altitude in an aircraft at the time, was killed when his aircraft failed to recover from a dive during an air meet.
- October 29 – Gordon Bennett Trophy Race (Belmont, New York) – French pilot Alfred Leblanc was injured when his aircraft struck a telephone pole and crashed. American pilot Walter Brookins was injured in a crash shortly after Leblanc's accident.
- October 1 – Milan, Italy – British pilot Captain Bertram Dickson was severely injured, and French pilot René Thomas was injured, when their aircraft were involved in what was reported at the time to be the first mid-air collision between aircraft.
- September 16 – Wisconsin State Fair (Milwaukee, Wisconsin) – Eight spectators were injured when an aircraft piloted by Archibald Hoxsey swerved and crashed into the crowd.
- September 10 – California State Fair (Sacramento, California) – Aviator Hamilton was injured when he lost control and crashed.
- August 10 – Chicago School of Aviation (Chicago, Illinois) – Seven spectators were injured when an aircraft piloted by Frank Bellai fell from a height of 100 feet (30 m) onto a group of 150 spectators.
- August 10 – Interlaken Aviation Field, Interlaken, New Jersey – Pilot Walter Brookins, along with seven spectators, were injured when his aircraft inverted and crashed onto a group of spectators while attempting to land in bad weather.
- July 12 – Hengistbury Airfield (Bournemouth, United Kingdom) – At the age of 32, Charles Stewart Rolls was killed when the tail of his Wright Flyer broke off during a flying display. Together with Frederick Henry Royce, he had co-founded the Rolls-Royce car manufacturing firm. He was the first Briton to be killed in an aeronautical accident, and the twelfth internationally. A statue in his memory, in which he is seen holding an incomplete biplane model, was erected in Agincourt Square, Monmouth. Following the crash of Rolls, another aviator named Audumar was seriously injured when his aircraft crashed at the same show.
- July 9 – Coventry, England – Parachutist Viola Spencer was killed when her parachute failed to open properly during an exhibition jump.
- July 8 – Reims, France – Pilot Raymonde de Laroche was injured when she crashed after the engine of her aircraft stopped while she was flying at an altitude of approximately 240 feet (73 m). She was performing an exhibition flight in front of thousands of spectators at the time of the accident.
- July 6 – Pittsburg, Kansas – Pilot Arch Hoxsey escaped injury when his aircraft crashed following an engine failure at 500 feet (150 m).
- July 2 – Emeryville Racetrack, Oakland, California – Pilot Samuel Smith was injured when his aircraft crash landed on top of a Farman Biplane piloted by Clifford O'Brien that had just crashed. O'Brien was not injured in the accident.
- June 13 – Springfield, Missouri – Pilot Charles F. Willard was injured when his aircraft's engine stopped while flying at a height of 50 feet (15 m).
- June 9 – Worcester, England – While attempting an exhibition at an agricultural show, an aviator lost control of his aircraft and crashed into a crowd of spectators, killing one and injuring himself and several others.
- 1 May – Fairgrounds, Fresno, California – Pilot Whipple S. Hall was injured when he lost control of his aircraft and crashed into a fence while giving an exhibition flight.
- April 26 – Issy-les-Moulineaux, Paris, France – Pilot Émile Dubonnet escaped injury when his aircraft crashed in heavy winds while performing a demonstration flight for former president Theodore Roosevelt.
- February 4 – Denver, Colorado – Pilot Louis Paulhan escaped injury when his aircraft crashed into a fence during a demonstration flight.

== 1909 ==
- October 18 – Grande Quinzaine de Paris (Port-Aviation, Viry-Châtillon, France) – One spectator was killed and a dozen injured when an aircraft piloted by Guy Blanck lost control and crashed into the grandstands during an airshow at Port-Aviation, also known as Juvisy Airfield.
- September 9 – Gray, Haute-Saône, France – Five spectators were killed and two injured when an aircraft suddenly dropped into a crowd while flying over.
- June 15 – Berwyn, Nebraska – Blacksmith and airplane builder Ulysses Sorenson escaped injury when his personally designed aircraft crashed on its test flight. Sorenson had the craft lifted to a height of 3,500 feet (1,100 m) via a hot air balloon, before a crowd that had gathered, and, when released, the craft entered into what may have been a flat spin until it crashed to the ground.
- 31 May – Brownsville, Texas – Pilot Newman escaped injury when his aircraft went out of control and crashed while being towed on its maiden voyage.

== 1908 ==
- September 17 – Fort Myer, Virginia – Pilot Orville Wright was injured, and passenger Lieutenant Thomas Selfridge was killed, when a propeller shattered, causing their aircraft to crash from an approximate height of 75 feet (23 m) in front of a crowd of two thousand.
- August 13 – Le Mans, France – Pilot Wilbur Wright escaped injury when his aircraft crashed while attempting a power off, glide landing from a height of 50 feet (15 m).
- 2 May – Issy-les-Moulineaux, France – Pilot M. De Lagrange was uninjured when his aircraft swerved, missed a crowd of spectators, and crashed into an automobile.

== 1906 ==
- April 14 – Jacksonville, Florida – Pilot and aircraft builder Israel Ludlow was severely injured when his bamboo frame glider, which was being towed aloft by two automobiles, suffered structural failure at an approximate height of 200 feet (61 m).

== 1905 ==
- October 22 – Hudson River, Manhattan, New York – Pilot and airplane builder Israel Ludlow escaped injury when his experimental glider aircraft crashed from a height of 400 feet (120 m) into the Hudson River, with thousands of spectators lining the riverbank. At the time, the aircraft lacked an engine or steering and was being towed aloft by a tugboat that had stopped, causing the aircraft to crash.
- July 18 – Santa Clara University, Santa Clara, California – Pilot Daniel J. Maloney was killed when his glider, named the Santa Clara, suffered structural collapse at a height of approximately 2,000 feet (610 m) while a crowd of thousands watched.

== 1904 ==
- October 26 – St. Louis World's Fair (St. Louis, Missouri) – Pilot William Avery suffered minor injuries when his aircraft crash landed following a mechanical failure.

== See also ==
- List of air show accidents and incidents in the 21st century
- List of accidents and incidents involving commercial aircraft
- List of air shows
- List of news aircraft accidents and incidents
- Lists of accidents and incidents involving military aircraft
