= 1911 Chicago International Aviation Meet =

Aviation show in Illinois, United States

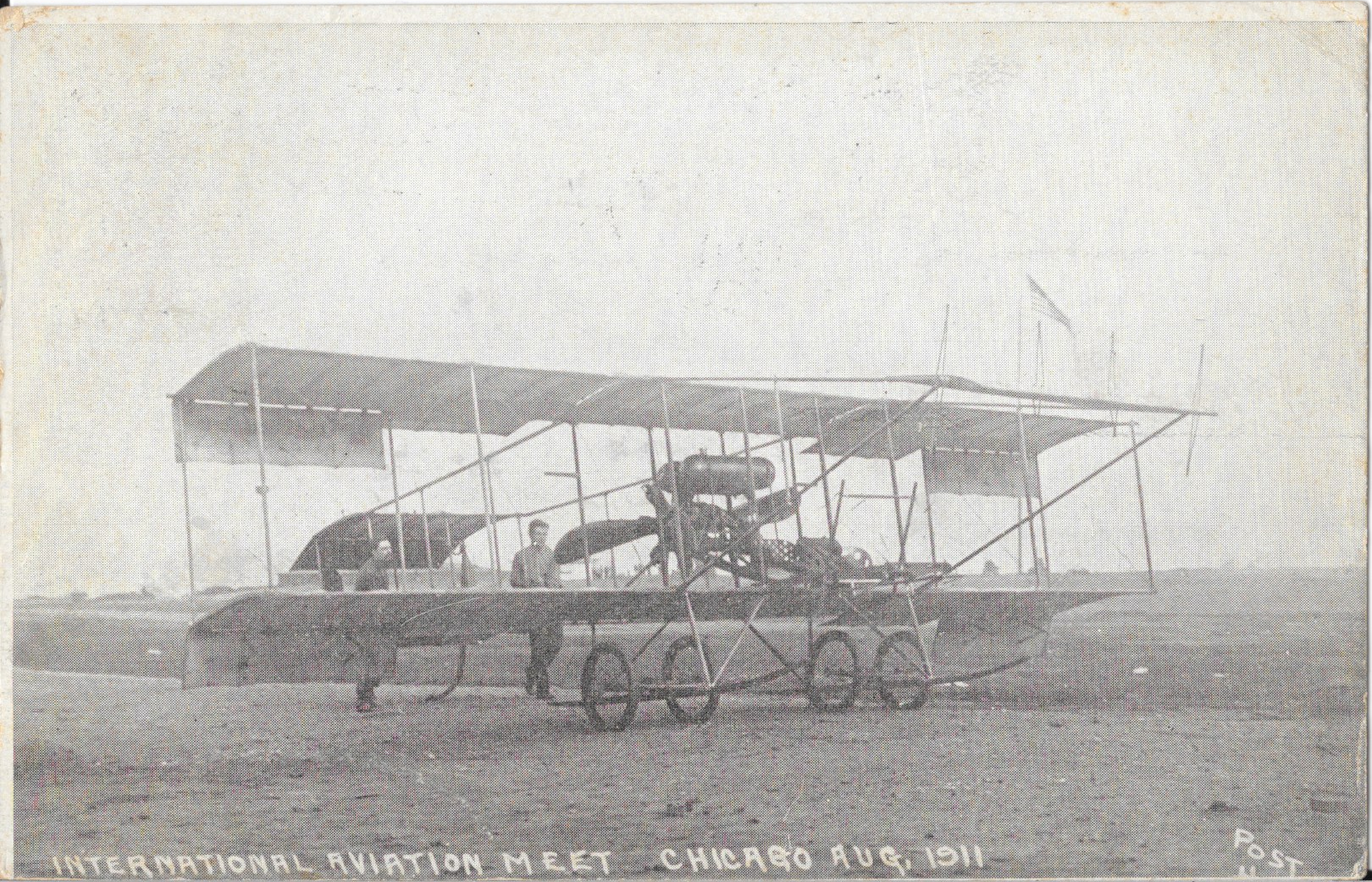
Postcard from the event

The 1911 Chicago International Aviation Meet (August 12 to August 20, 1911) was major aviation show held at Grant Park in Chicago, Illinois, United States in August 1911.

Organized by Cyrus McCormick Jr., thirty-two aviators attended, including Lincoln Beachey, Eugene Burton Ely, Thomas Sopwith, Glenn Curtiss, Thomas Scott Baldwin, René Simon, Earle Ovington, Harry Atwood, Claude Grahame-White, and Cal Rodgers.

Lincoln Beachey set a world altitude record of 11,642 feet at the meet.

William R. Badger and St. Croix Johnstone both died in aviation accidents at the meet. The wings on Badger's biplane collapsed when he tried to pull out of dive too late, and Johnstone crashed into Lake Michigan after his engine failed.
