= Rutherford Page =

American aviator

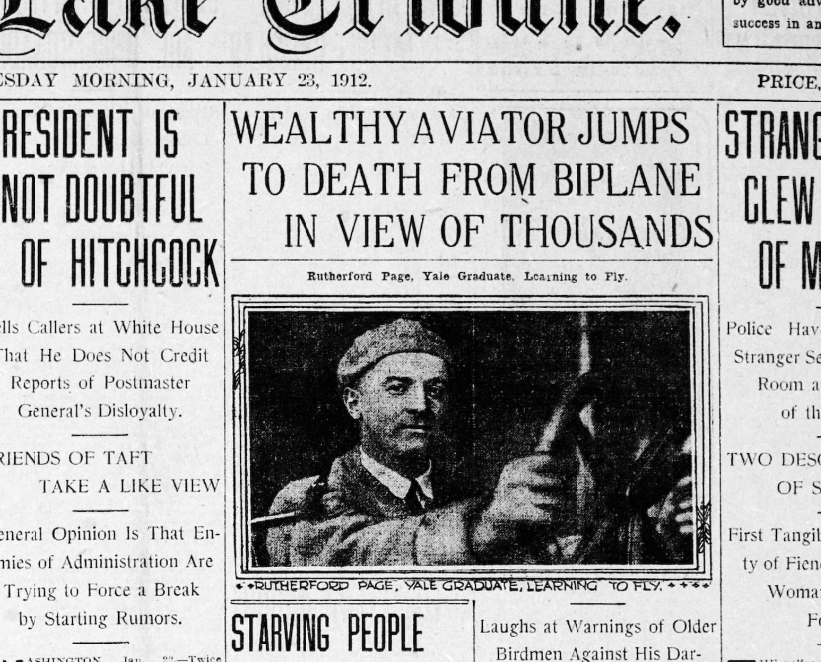
Page's obituary Salt Lake Tribune

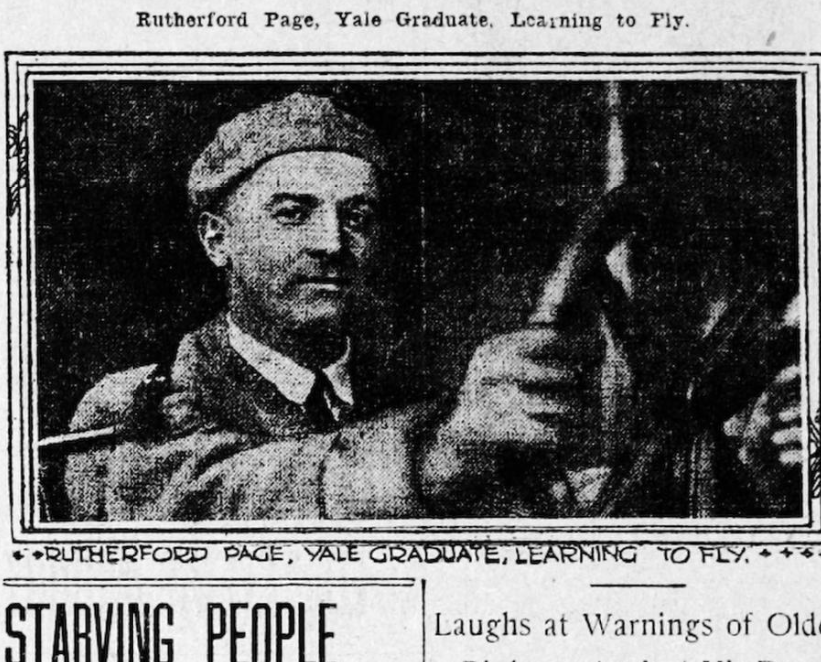
full newspaper photo

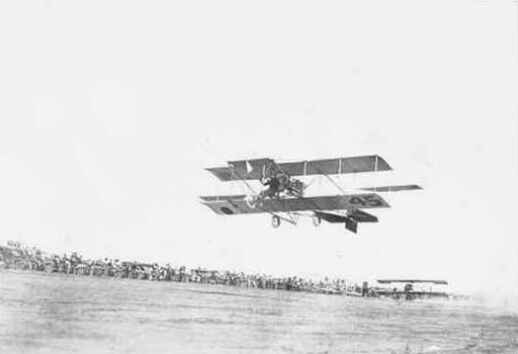
Page on January 22, 1912, taking off on his last flight

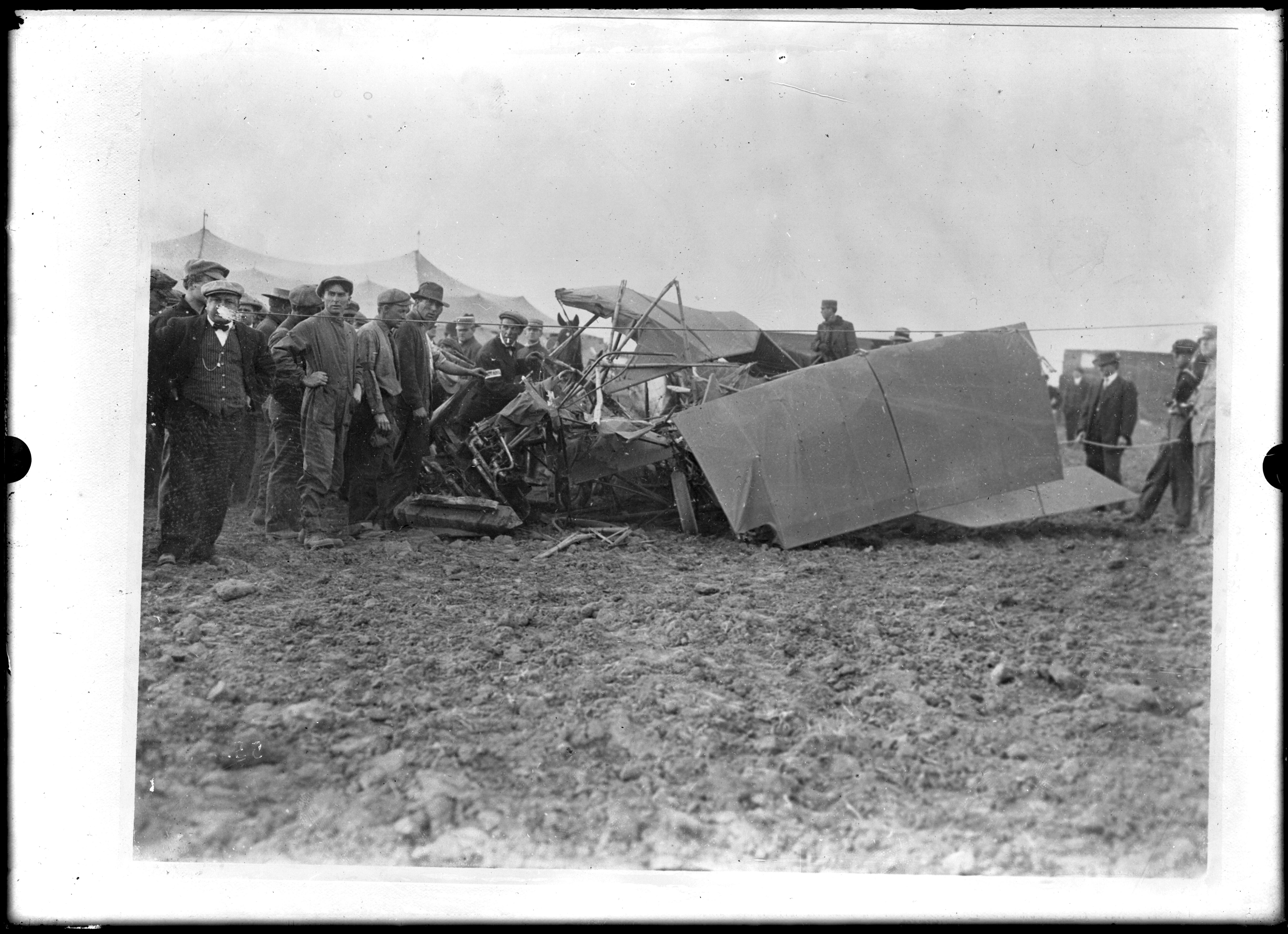
Page's wrecked machine

Rutherford Page (April 27, 1887 – January 22, 1912) was an early American aviator who died in an airplane crash.

== Biography ==
He was born on April 27, 1887, in Manhattan, New York City. He graduated from Yale University in 1910.

At 4:04 pm on January 22, 1912, at the "third international aviation meet" he lost control of his 1911 Curtiss Model E pusher biplane 75 feet (23 m) above Dominguez Field in Los Angeles. He abandoned the aircraft, and fell to his death onto a plowed field. He had only been taught to fly about six weeks earlier by Glenn Curtiss, and had received his pilot's license only four days before. When other, more experienced aviators, including Curtiss, warned him about his risky aerial maneuvers that day, he brushed them off. An account of Page's death can be found in Lawrence Goldstone's 2017 young adult book Higher, Steeper, Faster: The Daredevils Who Conquered the Skies.
