= William R. Badger =

American aviator

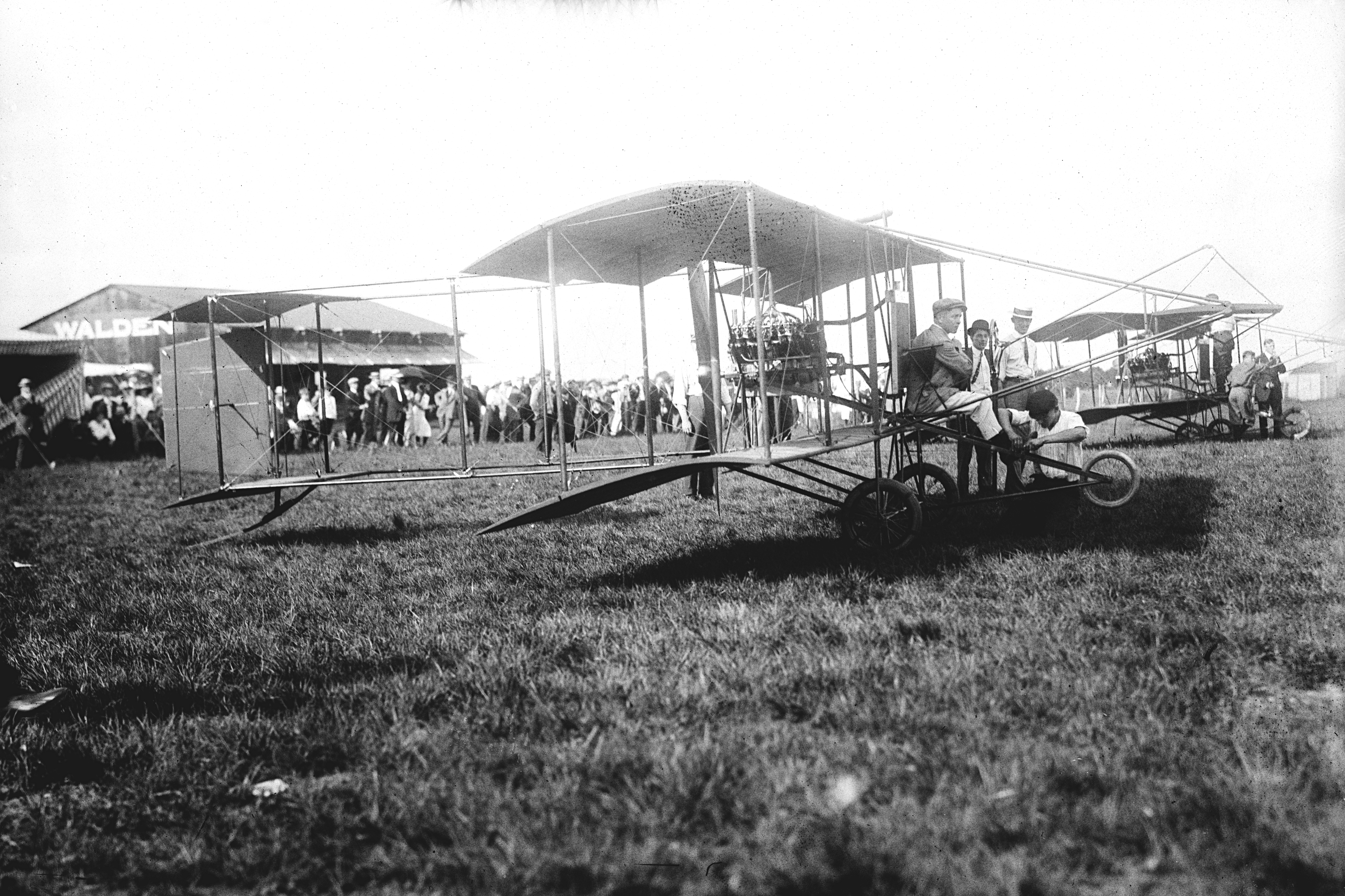
Badger in 1911

William R. Badger (1886 – August 15, 1911) was a wealthy pioneer aviator. He was orphaned early in life and inherited a sizable fortune from his parents. He and fellow aviator St. Croix Johnstone of Chicago died in two separate incidents on the same day at the 1911 Chicago International Aviation Meet at Grant Park.
