= St. Croix Johnstone =

American aviator

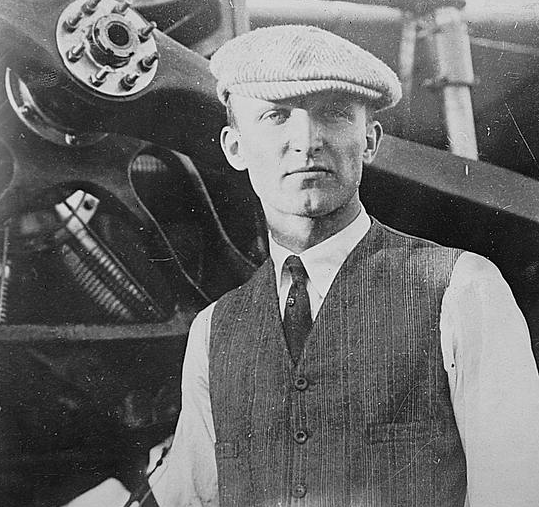
- Johnstone in 1910
- Born: January 2, 1887; Chicago, Illinois (Cook County, Illinois)
- Died: August 15, 1911 (aged 24); Chicago, Illinois (Cook County)
- Resting place: Oak Woods Cemetery
- Other name: Saint Croix Johnstone
- Occupation: aviator

St. Croix Johnstone (1887–1911) was an American early aviator who died in an airplane accident at the 1911 Chicago International Aviation Meet. A Chicago native, Johnstone was a chauffeur before becoming an aviator. His father tried to discourage him from taking up flying. He died at the same Air Meet that William R. Badger crashed at. Johnstone flew a Moisant monoplane, an American version of the Bleriot XI built under license in the United States. From 500 feet, Johnstone plummeted into Lake Michigan and drowned.

He is not related to fellow aviator Ralph Johnstone, who died in a crash the year before.
