= List of aircraft accidents and incidents by number of ground fatalities =

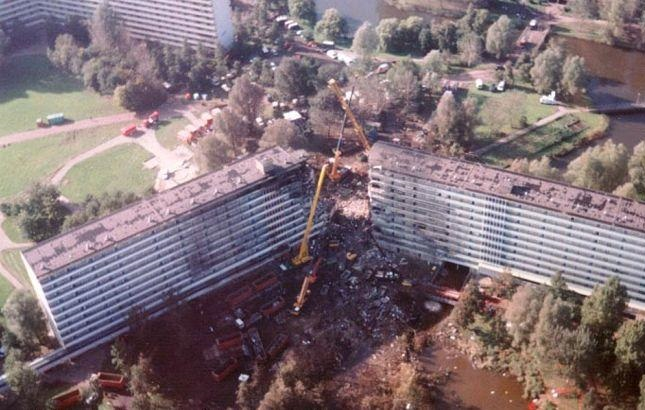
In 1992, El Al Flight 1862 crashed into a high-rise apartment complex in Amsterdam-Zuidoost, Netherlands, killing all four crew members on board as well as 43 people in the building.

The following is a list of aircraft accidents and incidents which have resulted in fatalities on the ground. Aircraft crashes with a high number of ground fatalities typically occur in areas where there are large congregations of people, such as buildings, marketplaces, neighborhoods, and sporting events.

As of 18 November 2026, 76 accidents and incidents have resulted in at least twelve ground fatalities, sixteen at least 50 ground fatalities, and six over 100 ground fatalities.

== History ==
The first ground fatalities from an aircraft crash occurred on 21 July 1919, when the Wingfoot Air Express crash took place. The airship crashed into the Illinois Trust and Savings Building in Chicago, Illinois, killing three of the five occupants of the aircraft, in addition to ten people on the ground. The first electric aircraft crash to result in ground fatalities was on 18 May 1935, when a Maxim Gorky was involved in a mid-air collision over Moscow, Russia, killing a total of 45 people, including nine on the ground. Just over three years later, on 24 July 1938, the Santa Ana air show disaster took place in Bogotá, Colombia, killing the pilot plus 52 people on the ground. Since then, several other crashes have resulted in a higher number of ground fatalities, most recently the Sknyliv air show disaster near Lviv, Ukraine, on 27 July 2002, which is the deadliest air show accident in history, killing 77 people on the ground.

The deliberate crashes of American Airlines Flight 11 and United Airlines Flight 175 into the World Trade Center as part of the September 11 attacks in 2001 constitute, by a large margin, the deadliest aircraft disaster by number of victims on the ground, with a total of approximately 2,600 ground fatalities attributed to the two crashes and subsequent collapse of 1 World Trade Center and 2 World Trade Center. In addition, the most ground fatalities associated with the accidental crash of an aircraft occurred on 8 January 1996, when an Antonov An-32 crashed into a crowded market in Kinshasa, Democratic Republic of the Congo, resulting in the deaths of at least 249 people on the ground.

== Table key ==
Symbol	Definition
†	No survivors on aircraft
‡	Was a deliberate act, i.e. bombing, hijacking, pilot murder-suicide, or airliner shootdown
*	Previously had the most ground fatalities of any incident
1*	Sole survivor

== Table ==
Fatalities				Injuries	Incident	Aircraft	Location	Date
Ground	Aircraft	Total	Notes	Injuries	Incident	Aircraft	Location	Date
est. 1,600 (Note: It is impossible to definitively know exactly how many people died from the hijacking and crash of American Airlines Flight 11, since this crash and the one of United Airlines Flight 175 happened in the same place, at about the same time, and it is hard to distinguish who died from which plane. It is known for certain, however, that the sum of plane and ground fatalities caused by both suicide attacks is 2,763. In addition to the rough estimate of 1,600 ground fatalities blamed on Flight 11, the number of people aboard the hijacked flight was 92. The death toll of Flight 11 thus comes out to approximately 1,700 when rounded.)	92	est. 1,700	†, ‡	c. 6,000–25,000 (Note: Combined with United Airlines Flight 175. Sources vary regarding the number of injuries―some say 6,000 while others go as high as 25,000.)	American Airlines Flight 11	Boeing 767-223ER	New York City, New York, U.S.	2001-09-11
est. 1,000 (Note: It is impossible to definitively know exactly how many people died from the hijacking and crash of United Airlines Flight 175, since this crash and the one of American Airlines Flight 11 happened in the same place, at about the same time, and it is hard to distinguish who died from which plane. It is known for certain, however, that the sum of plane and ground fatalities caused by both suicide attacks is 2,763. In addition to the rough estimate of 1,000 ground fatalities blamed on Flight 175, the number of people aboard the hijacked flight was 65. The death toll of Flight 175 thus comes out to approximately 1,060 when rounded.)	65	est. 1,000	†, ‡	c. 6,000–25,000 (Note: Combined with American Airlines Flight 11. Sources vary regarding the number of injuries―some say 6,000 while others go as high as 25,000.)	United Airlines Flight 175	Boeing 767-222	New York City, New York, U.S.	2001-09-11
249 (Note: The exact number of people that were killed on the ground is not known. The number of manslaughter charges was 225, ASN says 237, the CAA review 1990-1999 states 297, and some media sources have stated numbers over 300. Vincent Nicod of the International Committee of the Red Cross stated that 249 bodies on the ground were found. It is known that four crew members survived.)	2	251	*	500	Air Africa Antonov An-32 crash	Antonov An-32B	Kinshasa, D.R. Congo	1996-01-08
125	64	189	†, ‡	106	American Airlines Flight 77	Boeing 757-223	Arlington, Virginia, U.S.	2001-09-11
123	2	125	†, *	N/A	Operation Carthage	De Havilland DH.98 Mosquito FB Mk VI	Copenhagen, Denmark	1945-03-21
107	4	111	†	50	Flying Tiger Line N228SW crash	Canadair CL-44D4-1	Da Nang, Vietnam	1966-12-24
88	3	91	†	100+	Lloyd Aéreo Boliviano crash	Boeing 707-131F	Santa Cruz de la Sierra, Bolivia	1976-10-13
87	17	104	†	50	Ankara mid-air collision	Vickers Viscount 754D and Douglas C-47	near Ankara, Turkey	1963-02-01
77	0	77		545 (two on aircraft)	Sknyliv air show disaster	Sukhoi Su-27	Lviv, Ukraine	2002-07-27
71	84	155	†	N/A	Viasa Flight 742	McDonnell Douglas DC-9-32	Maracaibo, Venezuela	1969-03-16
67	3	70	†	500+	Ramstein air show disaster	Aermacchi MB-339 PAN (x3) and UH-60 Black Hawk	Ramstein-Miesenbach, Germany	1988-08-28
62	11	73	†, *	90	U.S. Air Force (42-40682) crash	Consolidated B-24 Liberator	Port Moresby, Papua New Guinea	1943-09-07
58	3	61	†	N/A	Freckleton air disaster	Consolidated B-24 Liberator	Freckleton, England	1944-08-23
53	5	58	†, *	190	Tokyo mid-air collision	Fokker Super Universal and Mitsubishi Ki1	Tokyo, Japan	1938-08-24
52	1	53	†, *	100	Santa Ana air show disaster	Curtiss Hawk II	Campo de Marte, Bogotá, Colombia	1938-07-24
50	0	50	1*	8	Indian Air Force MiG-27 crash	Mikoyan MiG-27	Meerut, Uttar Pradesh, India	1990-03-01
49	4	53	†	30	Aeroservicios Ecuatorianos Flight 767-103	Douglas DC-8-55F	Quito Canton, Ecuador	1984-09-18
49	23	72	†	N/A	Russian Air Force (RA-82005) crash	Antonov An-124-100	Irkutsk, Russia	1997-12-06
49	100	149		41 (15 on aircraft)	Mandala Airlines Flight 091	Boeing 737-230	Medan, Indonesia	2005-09-05
44	15	59	†	N/A	Korean Air Force Curtiss C-46 crash	Curtiss C-46	Yeouido, South Korea	1967-04-08
44	5	49		30+	Mexico City air disaster	Boeing C-97G Stratofreighter	Cuajimalpa, Mexico City, Mexico	1987-07-30
43	4	47	†	26+	El Al Flight 1862	Boeing 747-258F/SCD	Amsterdam, Netherlands	1992-10-04
37	3	40		111 (40 on aircraft)	Hewa Bora Airways Flight 122	McDonnell Douglas DC-9-51	Goma International Airport, D.R.C.	2008-04-15
36	1	37	†	171	Dhaka fighter jet crash	Chengdu F-7BGI	Dhaka, Bangladesh	2025-07-21
35	4	39	†	36	Turkish Airlines Flight 6491	Boeing 747-400F	Bishkek, Kyrgyzstan	2017-01-16
32	20	52	†	20	Munich C-131 crash	Convair C-131 Samaritan	Munich, Germany	1960-12-17
32	12	44	†	200	Beijing Hawker Siddeley Trident crash	Hawker Siddeley HS-121 Trident 2E	Beijing, China	1979-03-14
31	0	31	1* (Note: Sole survivor by virtue of being the only person on the aircraft.)	30	Bangui SEPECAT Jaguar A crash	SEPECAT Jaguar A	Bangui, Central African Republic	1986-03-27
30	4	34	†	50	Millon Air Flight 406	Boeing 707-323C	Manta, Ecuador	1996-10-22
30	73	103		51 (four on aircraft)	EAS Airlines Flight 4226	BAC One-Eleven 500	Kano, Nigeria	2002-05-04
30	21	51	1*	30 (one on aircraft)	Africa One Antonov An-26 crash	Antonov An-26	Kinshasa, D.R.C.	2007-10-04
29	2	31	†	60	Farnborough Airshow DH.110 crash	de Havilland DH.110	Hampshire, England	1952-09-06
29	17	46	†	10	Sudanese Air Force Antonov An-26 crash	Antonov An-26	Khartoum, Sudan	2025-02-25
26	6	32	†	14	Aéro-Service Ilyushin Il-76T crash	Ilyushin Il-76T	Brazzaville, Republic of the Congo	2012-11-30
25	0	25	1*	71	Imber friendly fire incident	Hawker Hurricane	Imber, England	1942-04-13
25	8	33	†	N/A	Svetlogorsk An-24 crash	Antonov An-26	Svetlogorsk, Russia	1972-05-16
24	10	34		N/A	Air Vietnam Douglas DC-6B crash	Douglas DC-6B	Nha Trang, Vietnam	1969-12-22
24	126	150	†	63+	Cubana de Aviación Flight 9046	Ilyushin Il-62M	Havana, Cuba	1989-09-03
24	3	27	†	N/A	Aerial Transit Company (N84BL) crash	Douglas DC-6BF	Guatemala City, Guatemala	1990-05-05
24	0	24		100	Green Ramp disaster	General Dynamics F-16D, Lockheed C-130E and C-141B	Pope AFB, Fayetteville, North Carolina, U.S.	1994-03-23
23	7	30	†	27	USAF KC-135 Wichita crash	Boeing KC-135A-BN Stratotanker	McConnell AFB, Wichita, Kansas, U.S.	1965-01-16
23	1	24		43 (six on aircraft)	Bolivian Air Force Lockheed C-130 crash	Lockheed C-130H Hercules	El Alto, Bolivia	2026-02-27
22	1	23	†	4	Apeldoorn Fairey Firefly crash	Fairey Firefly	Apeldoorn, Netherlands	1946-10-07
22	0	22	1*	28	Sacramento Canadair Sabre accident	Canadair Sabre Mk 5	Sacramento Executive Airport, California, U.S.	1972-09-24
22	3	25	†	15	TAMPA Colombia Boeing 707 crash	Boeing 707-373C	Medellín, Colombia	1983-12-14
22	3	25	†	200	Transbrasil Flight 801	Boeing 707-349C	Guarulhos, Brazil	1989-03-21
21 (Note: Some sources reported up to 29 fatalities on the ground.)	2	23	†	16–18	Turkish Air Force F-84 Thunderjet crash	Republic F-84G Thunderjet	Bursa, Turkey	1957-07-25
20	2	22		24	US Navy SBD Dauntless mid-air collision	Douglas SBD-5 Dauntless (x2)	Pauwela, Hawaii, U.S.	1943-12-07
20	60	80	†	N/A	Iranian Air Force C-130 crash	Lockheed C-130H Hercules	Kahrizak, Iran	1981-09-29
20	4	24	†	2	LAC Colombia Flight 028	Douglas DC-8-55F	Luque, Paraguay	1996-02-04
20	0	20		0	Cavalese U.S. Marine Corps EA-6B Prowler accident	Northrop Grumman EA-6B Prowler	Cavalese, Italy	1998-02-03
19	1	20	†	50	Flagler air show disaster	Low-winged Monoplane	Flagler, Colorado, U.S.	1951-09-15
19	53	72	†	23	EgyptAir Flight 864	Boeing 707-300	Bangkok, Thailand	1976-12-25
19	4	23	†	14	Pointe-Noire Trans Air Congo An-12 crash	Antonov An-12	Pointe-Noire, Republic of the Congo	2011-03-21
19	241	260	1*	68 (one on aircraft)	Air India Flight 171	Boeing 787-8 Dreamliner	Ahmedabad, India	2025-06-12
18	0	18	1*	210	Okinawa F-100 crash	North American F-100 Super Sabre	Uruma, Japan	1959-06-30
18	4	22	†	2	LAC Colombia Flight 028	Douglas DC-8-55CF	Mariano Roque Alonso, Paraguay	1996-02-04
17	122	139	†	3	Indonesian Air Force Lockheed C-130B Hercules crash	Lockheed C-130B Hercules	Medan, North Sumatra, Indonesia	2015-06-30
17	0	17		25	Ma'agan Piper J-3 Cub crash	Piper J-3 Cub	Ma'agan Kibbutz, Israel	1954-07-29
16	4	20	†	Several	Rabat Vickers Wellington crash	Vickers 440 Wellington B Mark X	Rabat, Malta	1946-04-05
15	67	82	†	8	Cerritos mid-air collision	McDonnell Douglas DC-9-32 and Piper PA-28-181 Archer	Cerritos, California, U.S.	1986-08-31
15	0	15		26	Yeysk Su-34 crash	Sukhoi Su-34	Yeysk, Krasnodar Krai, Russia	2022-10-17
12-17	15-21	32-33		27	Philippine Air Force F27 Friendship crash	Fokker F-27 Friendship 200	Parañaque, Philippines	1978-09-14
14	0	14		15	Mexican Air Force Sikorsky UH-60M crash	Sikorsky UH-60M Black Hawk	Santiago Jamiltepec, Oaxaca State, Mexico	2018-02-16
13	2	15	†	N/A	Orléans Convent Crash	Avro Canada CF-100 Canuck Mk 4B	Orleans, Ontario, Canada	1956-05-15
13	6	19	†	N/A	Delta Air Lines Flight 9877	Douglas DC-8-51	New Orleans, Louisiana, U.S.	1967-03-30
13	11	24	†	N/A	Savanair (EY-ASS) crash	Antonov An-12	Luanda, Angola	1999-02-02
13	20	33		N/A	Boende Antonov An-26 crash	Antonov An-26	Boende, D.R.C.	2003-11-29
12	1	13	†	17	Edmonton air crash	Hawker Audax	Edmonton, London, U.K.	1938-09-04
12	0	12	1*	89 (one on aircraft)	Italian Air Force MB-326 crash	Aermacchi MB-326	Casalecchio di Reno, Italy	1990-12-06
12	5	17	†	18+	USAF C-130B Evansville crash	Lockheed C-130B Hercules	Evansville, Indiana, U.S.	1992-02-06
12	94	106	†	90	Iranian Air Force C-130E crash	Lockheed C-130E Hercules	Tehran, Iran	2005-12-06
12	187	199	†	0	TAM Airlines Flight 3054	Airbus A320-233	Congonhas-São Paulo Airport, Brazil	2007-07-17
12	0	12		4 (all on aircraft)	Allied Air Flight 111	Boeing 727-221F Advanced	Accra, Ghana	2012-06-02
12	0	12	1*	24 (one on aircraft)	Sanaa Sukhoi Su-22 crash	Sukhoi Su-22	Sanaa, Yemen	2013-02-19
12	3	15	†	22	UPS Airlines Flight 2976	McDonnell Douglas MD-11F	Louisville, Kentucky, U.S	2025-11-04
11	3	14	†	1	B-25 Empire State Building crash	B-25 Mitchell	New York City, New York, U.S.	1945-07-28
11	3	14	†	45	USS Nimitz EA-6B Prowler crash	Northrop Grumman EA-6B Prowler, Grumman A-6 Intruder, Sikorsky SH-3 Sea King, Grumman F-14 Tomcat (x5), LTV A-7 Corsair II (x9) and S-3A Viking (x3)	USS Nimitz, 70 miles offshore Jacksonville, Florida, U.S.	1981-05-26
11	259	270	†, ‡	N/A	Pan Am Flight 103	Boeing 747-121	Lockerbie, Scotland	1988-12-21
11	3	14	†	20	Beechcraft 65-80 Queen Air crash	Beechcraft Queen Air	Parañaque, Philippines	2011-12-10
11	0	11	1*	16 (one on aircraft)	Shoreham Airshow crash	Hawker Hunter T7	Shoreham-by-Sea, West Sussex, England	2015-08-22
10	3	13	*	27	Wingfoot Air Express crash	Type FD dirigible	Chicago, Illinois, U.S.	1919-07-21
10	32	42	†	N/A	VASP Flight 233	Vickers 827 Viscount	Rio de Janeiro, Brazil	1959-12-22
10	0	10	1*	7 (one on aircraft)	Indianapolis Ramada Inn A-7D Corsair II crash	LTV A-7 Corsair II	Indianapolis, Indiana, U.S.	1987-10-20
10	70	80		39 (21 on aircraft)	Cubana de Aviación Flight 389	Tupolev Tu-154M	Quito, Ecuador	1998-08-29
10	5	15	†	N/A	Lockheed C-130H Hercules crash	Lockheed C-130H Hercules	Blida, Algeria	2003-06-20
10	1	11	†	69	Reno Air Races crash	North American P-51D Mustang	Reno, Nevada, U.S.	2011-09-16
9	36	45	†	N/A	Maksim Gorky crash	Tupolev ANT-20 Maxim Gorky	Khodynka Aerodrome, Moscow, Russia	1935-05-18
9	1	10		N/A	U.S. Air Force (57-0468) crash	Lockheed C-130A Hercules	Ashiya, Fukuoka, Japan	1959-05-20
9	63	72		21 (20 on aircraft)	Southern Airways Flight 242	Douglas DC-9-30	New Hope, Georgia, U.S.	1977-04-04
9	2	11	†	21	Los Llanos Air Base crash	General Dynamics F-16 Fighting Falcon, AMX International AMX (x2), Dassault Alpha Jet (x2) and Dassault Mirage 2000	Los Llanos Air Base, Spain	2015-01-26
8	3	11	†	N/A	TWA Flight 595	Lockheed L-1049H Super Constellation	Chicago, Illinois, U.S.	1959-11-24
8	6	14	†	60	Paris Air Show crash	Tupolev Tu-144	Paris, France	1973-06-03
8	145	153	†	9	Pan Am Flight 759	Boeing 727-235	Kenner, Louisiana, U.S.	1982-07-09
8	8	16	1*	N/A	Air Liberia (EL-AIH) crash	British Aerospace BAe-748-329 Srs. 2A LFD	Khartoum, Sudan	1983-04-16
8	0	8		106 (87 on aircraft)	Philippine Airlines Flight 124	BAC One-Eleven 516FP	Manila, Philippines	1989-07-21
8	0	8	1*	17	Jalandhar MiG-21 crash	Mikoyan-Gurevich MiG-21	Jalandhar, Punjab, India	2002-05-03
8	0	8		9	Services Air Airbus A310-300 crash	Airbus A-310-304F	Mbuji-Mayi, D.R.C.	2015-12-24
7	23	30	†	1	American Airlines Flight 6780	Convair 240	Elizabeth, New Jersey, U.S.	1952-01-22
7	12	19		173 (eight on aircraft)	Fairfield-Suisun Boeing B-29 crash	Boeing B-29 Superfortress	Fairfield-Suisun Air Force Base, California, U.S.	1950-08-05
7	6	13		N/A	São Paulo Convair CV-240 crash	Convair CV-240-0	São Paulo, Brazil	1963-01-15
7	137	144	†	9	PSA Flight 182	Boeing 727-214 and Cessna 172	San Diego, California, U.S.	1978-09-25
7	0	7		N/A	Transafrik International Boeing 727-44F crash	Boeing 727-44F	M'banza-Kongo, Angola	1994-04-27
7	42	49	†	0	Wuhan Airlines Flight 343	Xian Y-7	Hanyang District, Wuhan, China	2000-06-22
7	3	10	†	4	North American CT-39A Sabreliner crash	North American CT-39A Sabreliner	Culiacán, Sinaloa, Mexico	2007-07-05
7	9	16	†	40	Mexico City plane crash	Learjet 45	Las Lomas, Mexico City, Mexico	2008-11-04
7	3	10	†	31	Glasgow helicopter crash	Eurocopter EC135-T2+	Glasgow, Scotland	2013-11-29
6	15	21	†	N/A	Ruislip Wellington accident	Vickers Wellington	Ruislip, London, U.K.	1942-10-18
6	128	134	†	9	New York mid-air collision	Douglas DC-8-11 and Lockheed L-1049 Super Constellation	near Miller Field, New York City, U.S.	1960-12-16
6	0	6		0	French Air Force Republic F-84F Thunderstreak accident	Republic F-84F Thunderstreak	Aiguille du Midi, Mont Blanc, France	1961-08-29
6	4	10	†	12	Dominicana de Aviación Flight 401	Aviation Traders ATL-98 Carvair	Miami, Florida, U.S.	1969-06-23
6	0	6	1*	0	Rhein-Main Starfighter crash	Canadair CF-104 Starfighter	near Rhein-Main Air Base, Frankfurt, Germany	1983-05-22
6	1	7	†	50+	Remscheid A-10 crash	A-10 Thunderbolt II	Remscheid, West Germany	1988-12-08
6	74	80		139	Korean Air Flight 803	McDonnell Douglas DC-10-30	Tripoli, Libya	1989-07-27
6	46	52	†	N/A	Kenya Air Force DHC-5D Buffalo crash	de Havilland Canada DHC-5D Buffalo	near Moi Air Base, Kenya	1992-04-16
6	3	9		N/A	Trans Service Airlift Nord 262A-44 crash	Nord 262A-44	Kinshasa, D.R.C.	1993-01-27
6	196	202	†	N/A	China Airlines Flight 676	Airbus A300B4-622R	Taoyuan City, Taiwan	1998-02-16
6	16 (8 per plane)	22	†	2	PLAAF Shaanxi Y-8 crash	Shaanxi Yunshuji Y-8	Zhengzhou, Henan, China	2001-01-04
6	2	8	†	0	Reali Táxi Aéreo Learjet 35 crash	Learjet 35A	São Paulo, Brazil	2007-11-04
6	153	159	†	N/A	Dana Air Flight 992	McDonnell Douglas MD-83	Lagos, Nigeria	2012-06-03
6	19	25	†	Unknown	Busy Bee Congo crash	Dornier 228	Goma, D.R.C.	2019-11-24
5	20	25	†	N/A	US Army Air Force (42-72171) crash	Douglas C-54A-1-DC (DC-4)	near Glasgow Prestwick Airport, Scotland	1944-08-28
5	1	6	†	12	Minneapolis Grumman F9F Panther crash	Grumman F9F-4 Panther	Minneapolis, Minnesota, U.S.	1956-06-09
5	51	56		N/A	Varig Airlines Flight 837	Douglas DC-8-33	Monrovia, Liberia	1967-03-05
5	3	8	†	42	Korean Air Cargo Flight 6316	McDonnell Douglas MD-11	Shanghai, China	1999-04-15
5	1	6		0	Myanmar Air Force J-7 crash	Chengdu J-7	Sapar Sae, Pale, Myanmar	2025-06-10
5	55	60		8 (three on aircraft)	Alliance Air Flight 7412	Boeing 737-2A8	Patna, Bihar, India	2000-07-17
5	260	265	†	1	American Airlines Flight 587	Airbus A300B4-605R	Queens, New York, U.S.	2001-11-12
5	1	6	†	10	Libyan Air Force Mikoyan-Gurevich MiG-21 crash	Mikoyan-Gurevich MIG21-bis	Tobruk, Libya	2014-09-02
5	5	10	†	2	Philippine Piper PA-23 Apache crash	Piper PA-23	Plaridel, Bulacan, Philippines	2018-03-17
5	1	6		9 (two on aircraft)	Chrcynno Cessna Grand Caravan crash	Cessna 208B Grand Caravan	Chrcynno, Poland	2023-07-17
5	0	5		5 (two on aircraft)	21 Air Flight 7598	Boeing 767-33AER(BDSF)	Miami, Florida, U.S.	2026-09-06
4	29	33		34 (all on aircraft)	National Airlines Flight 101	Douglas DC-6	Elizabeth, New Jersey, U.S.	1952-02-11
4	3	7	†	0	London Vickers Viking accident	Vickers VC.1 Viking	Southall, England	1958-09-02
4	0	4	1*	32	Machida F-8 crash	Vought RF-8A Crusader	Machida, Tokyo, Japan	1964-04-05
4	82	86		5 (all on aircraft)	Japan Airlines Flight 471	Douglas DC-8-53	near New Delhi, India	1972-06-14
4	1	5	†, ‡	11	Aeroflot (CCCP-79868) crash	Antonov An-2	Novosibirsk, Russia	1976-09-26
4	1	5	†, ‡	4	Connellan air disaster	Beechcraft 58 Baron	Alice Springs, Australia	1977-01-05
4	74	78		9 (five on aircraft)	Air Florida Flight 90	Boeing 737-222	Washington, D.C. and Arlington County, Virginia, U.S.	1982-01-13
4	174	178		2 (all on aircraft)	Aeroflot Flight 3352	Tupolev Tu-154B-1	Omsk, Russian SFSR, Soviet Union	1984-10-11
4	21	25	†	0	Aerolift Philippines Flight 075	Beechcraft 1900C-1	Parañaque, Philippines	1990-05-18
4	24	28	†	0	Tbilisi Tupolev Tu-154 crash	Tupolev Tu-154B	Tbilisi, Georgia	1992-07-20
4	109	113	†	6	Air France Flight 4590	Concorde	Gonesse, France	2000-07-25
4	114	118	†	4	Linate Airport runway collision	McDonnell-Douglas MD-87 and Cessna Citation CJ2	Linate Airport, Milan, Italy	2001-10-08
4	0	4	1*	0	San Diego F/A-18 crash	F/A-18D Hornet	University City, San Diego, California, U.S.	2008-12-08
4	7	11	†	11	Indonesian Air Force Fokker F27 crash	Fokker F-27 Friendship 400M	Jakarta, Indonesia	2012-06-21
4	1	5	†	2	Yorba Linda Cessna 414A crash	Cessna 414A Chancellor	Yorba Linda, California, U.S.	2019-02-03
4	10	14	†	25	Brovary helicopter crash	Eurocopter EC225 Super Puma	Brovary, Kyiv Oblast, Ukraine	2023-01-18
3	8	11	†	N/A	Sun Way Flight 4412	Ilyushin Il-76TD	Karachi, Pakistan	2010-11-28
3	0	3		14	Maroochy air crash	Royal Australian Air Force	Maroochydore, Australia	1950-12-30
3	0	3	1*	1 (on aircraft)	Ford Hawker Hunter WT707 accident	Hawker Hunter F.1	Ford, Sussex, U.K.	1955-01-25
3	5	8	1*	75 (one on aircraft)	Pacoima mid-air collision	Douglas DC-7B and Northrop F-89J Scorpion	San Fernando Valley, California, U.S.	1957-01-31
3	4	7	†	3	Syerston Avro Vulcan crash	Avro Vulcan	RAF Syerston, Nottinghamshire, England	1958-09-20
3	5	8	†	0	Flying Tiger Line Flight 183	Lockheed L-1049H Super Constellation (N6913C)	North Hollywood, California, U.S.	1962-12-14
3	0	3		6	Yokohama F-4 crash	McDonnell Douglas RF-4B Phantom II	Yokohama, Japan	1977-09-27
3	2	5	†	N/A	Mandala Airlines PK-RHS crash	Hawker Siddeley HS 748	Manila, Philippines	1977-10-18
3	1	4	†, ‡	10	SATENA (FAC-1101) crash	Hawker Siddeley HS-748-260 Srs. 2A	Bogotá, Colombia	1979-08-22
3	0	3		6 (all on aircraft)	Twilight Zone accident	Bell UH-1B Iroquois	Santa Clarita, California, U.S.	1982-07-23
3	107	110	†, ‡	N/A	Avianca Flight 203	Boeing 727-21	Soacha, Bogotá, Colombia	1989-11-27
4	95	99	†	N/A	TAM Transportes Aéreos Regionais Flight 402	Fokker 100	São Paulo, Brazil	1996-10-31
3	0	3		69 (44 on aircraft)	Philippine Airlines Flight 137	Airbus A320-214	Bacolod, Philippines	1998-03-22
3	1	4	†	6	Wichita King Air crash	Beechcraft King Air B200	Wichita, Kansas, U.S.	2014-10-30
3	3	6	†	0	Gaithersburg Embraer Phenom 100 crash	Embraer Phenom 100	Gaithersburg, Maryland, U.S.	2014-12-08
3	0	3		8 (four on aircraft)	Fulda Cessna F172N Skyhawk crash	Cessna F172N Skyhawk	Fulda, Germany	2018-10-14
3	50	53		50 (46 on aircraft)	Philippine Air Force C-130 crash	Lockheed C-130H Hercules	Patikul, Sulu, Philippines	2021-07-04
3	0	3		61 (20 on aircraft)	LATAM Airlines Perú Flight 2213	Airbus A320-271N	Jorge Chávez International Airport, Lima, Peru	2022-11-18
3	0	3	1*	3 (one on aircraft)	Rajasthan MiG-21 crash	Mikoyan-Gurevich MiG-21	Bahlol Nagar, Hanumangarh, Rajasthan, India	2023-05-08
3	17	20		4 (all on aircraft)	Sutton Wick air crash	Blackburn Beverley C.1	Sutton Wick, Drayton, Berkshire, England	1957-03-05
2	13	15	†	0	Northwest Orient Airlines Flight 307	Martin 2-0-2	Minneapolis, Minnesota, U.S.	1950-03-07
2	20	22	†	"several"	British European Airways Flight 411	Vickers Viscount	Wythenshawe, England	1957-03-14
2	2	4	†	0	Cambrian Airways Liverpool crash	Vickers 701 Viscount	Liverpool, England	1965-07-20
2	0	2		4 (3 on aircraft)	Channel Airways Vickers Viscount G-AVJZ crash	Vickers Viscount	London Southend Airport, England	1967-05-03
2	48	50		15 (14 on aircraft)	Ariana Afghan Airlines Flight 701	Boeing 727-113C	Fernhill, West Sussex, England	1969-01-05
2	74	76	1*	1 (on aircraft)	Air Vietnam C-54D (XV-NUG) and U.S. Air Force mid-air collision	Douglas C-54D-10-DC Skymaster and F-4 Phantom II	Da Nang, Vietnam	1969-09-20
2	99	101	1*	1 (on aircraft)	LANSA Flight 502	Lockheed L-188 Electra	Cusco, Peru	1970-08-09
2	43	45		18 (16 on aircraft)	United Airlines Flight 553	Boeing 737-222	Chicago, Illinois, U.S.	1972-12-08
2	16	18	†	N/A	Nigeria Airways 5N-ANA crash	Fokker F28	Kano Airport, Nigeria	1978-03-01
2	271	273	†	2	American Airlines Flight 191	McDonnell Douglas DC-10	Des Plaines, Illinois, U.S.	1979-05-25
2	5	7	†, ‡	4	Barra do Garças air disaster	Embraer EMB 721 Sertanejo	Barra do Garças, Mato Grosso, Brazil	1980-06-01
2	154	156	1*	6 (one on aircraft)	Northwest Airlines Flight 255	McDonnell Douglas MD-82	Romulus, Michigan, U.S.	1987-08-16
2	6	8	†, ‡	1	Zimex Aviation HB-ILF crash	Lockheed L-100-30 Hercules	near Kuito, Angola	1987-10-14
2	5	7	†	5	Merion mid-air collision	Bell 412SP and Piper PA-60-601 Aerostar	Lower Merion Township, Pennsylvania	1991-04-04
2	13	15		N/A	Saint Petersburg Tupolev Tu-154 crash	Tupolev Tu-154B-1	Saint Petersburg, Russia	1991-05-23
2	133	135	1*	1 (on aircraft)	Indonesian Air Force A-1324 crash	Lockheed C-130H-30 Hercules	Jakarta, Indonesia	1991-10-05
2	16	18	1*	3 (one on aircraft)	Dirgantara Air Service Flight 5940	CASA C-212 Aviocar	Banjarmasin, South Kalimantan, Indonesia	1996-12-07
2	63	65		40 (37 on aircraft)	LAPA Flight 3142	Boeing 737-204C	Palermo, Argentina	1999-08-31
2	16	18		57 (37 on aircraft)	Cubana de Aviación Flight 1216	McDonnell Douglas DC-10	Guatemala City, Guatemala	1999-12-21
2	1	3	†	60	Pirelli Tower airplane crash	Rockwell Commander A112	Milan, Italy	2002-04-18
2	53	55	†	0	China Eastern Airlines Flight 5210	Bombardier CRJ-200LR	Baotou, Inner Mongolia, China	2004-11-21
2	3	5		65 (all on aircraft)	TACA Flight 390	Airbus A320-233	Tegucigalpa, Honduras	2008-05-30
2	0	2		8 (all on aircraft)	Centurion Air Cargo Flight 164	Boeing 747-209BSF	Madrid, Cundinamarca, Colombia	2008-07-07
2	97	99		70 (15 on aircraft)	Indonesian Air Force L-100-30(P) crash	Lockheed L-100-30(P) Hercules	Geplak, Java, Indonesia	2009-05-20
2	5	7	†	0	AeroUnion Flight 302	Airbus A300B4-203F	Monterrey, Mexico	2010-04-13
2	4	6		5 (all on aircraft)	Katanga Express Gulfstream IV crash	Gulfstream IV	Kavumu Airport, D.R. Congo	2012-02-12
2	2	4	†	0	East Haven Rockwell Commander 690B crash	Rockwell Commander 690B	East Haven, Connecticut, U.S.	2013-08-09
2	5	7	†	0	Rio Jur Beechcraft Super King Air crash	Beechcraft Super King Air	Bogotá, Colombia	2007-10-11
2	8	10	†	0	Elmina plane crash	Beechcraft Model 390 (Model I)	Elmina, Sungai Buloh, Selangor, Malaysia	2023-08-17
2	6	8	†	23	Med Jets Flight 056	Learjet 55	Philadelphia, Pennsylvania, U.S.	2025-01-31
2	2	4	†	N/A	Iranian Army AH-1 SuperCobra crash	Bell AH-1 SuperCobra	Dorcheh, Isfahan, Iran	2026-02-24
2	0	2		4 (all on aircraft)	Emirates SkyCargo Flight 9788	Boeing 747-481BDSF	Hong Kong International Airport, Hong Kong	2025-10-20
1	35	36		N/A	Hindenburg disaster	Hindenburg class airship	NAS Lakehurst, New Jersey, U.S.	1937-05-06
1	13	14	†	N/A	Jersey Airport disaster	de Havilland D.H.86	Jersey Airport, U.K.	1938-11-04
1	6	7	†	0	Royal Air Force LJ622 crash	Short Stirling	Tockwith, Yorkshire, England	1945-10-09
1	3	4	1*	3 (one on aircraft)	Luqa Avro Lancaster crash	Avro Lancaster B Mark III GR	Luqa, Malta	1952-12-30
1	0	1		N/A	Royal Air Force TG564 crash	Handley Page Hastings C.1	Kowloon, Hong Kong	1953-07-27
1	36	37	†	0	Trans-Canada Air Lines Flight 9	Canadair C-4-1 Argonaut and North American T-6 Texan	Moose Jaw, Saskatchewan, Canada	1954-04-08
1	72	73	†	0	Sabena Flight 548	Boeing 707-320	Brussels, Belgium	1961-02-15
1	17	18		84 (all on aircraft)	United Airlines Flight 859	Douglas DC-8-12	Denver, Colorado, U.S.	1961-07-11
1	79	80		5 (all on aircraft)	US Air Force (61-0332) crash	Boeing C-135B	Angeles City, Philippines	1964-05-11
1	1	2		N/A	Canadian Pacific Air Lines Flight 322	Boeing 707-138B	Vancouver, British Columbia, Canada	1968-02-07
1	29	30	†	N/A	Garuda Indonesian Airways Flight 892	Convair CV-990-30A-5 Coronado	Nala Sopara, India	1968-05-28
1	57	58	†	N/A	Pan African Airlines N90427 crash	Douglas C-54B-1-DC Skymaster	Rivers State, Nigeria	1968-09-28
1	16	17		35 (32 on aircraft)	Mohawk Airlines Flight 405	Fairchild Hiller FH-227B	Albany, New York, U.S.	1972-03-03
1	85	86	†	0	Aviaco Flight 118	Sud Aviation SE 210 Caravelle 10R	A Coruña, Spain	1973-08-13
1	25	26		36 (all on aircraft)	Garuda Indonesian Airways Flight 150	Fokker F28-1000 Fellowship	near Talang Betutu Airport, Palembang, Indonesia	1975-09-24
1	5	6		20	Żabbar Avro Vulcan crash	Avro Vulcan B.2	Żabbar, Malta	1975-10-14
1	61	62	†	0	Aeroflot Flight 2003	Tupolev Tu-124V	Kokoshkino, Moscow Oblast, Russia	1976-01-03
1	2	3	†	1	Air Chicago Freight Airlines N9446Z crash	North American B-25 Mitchell	Chicago, Illinois, U.S.	1976-08-06
1	0	1		N/A	Indian Airlines VT-EFL crash	Boeing 737	Hyderabad, India	1977-01-12
1	0	1	1*	1 (on aircraft)	Air Inter F-BHRZ crash	Sud Caravelle	Bordeaux, France	1977-02-21
1	68	69		2 (all on aircraft)	Aeroflot Flight 331	Ilyushin Il-62M	Boyeros, Cuba	1977-05-27
1	77	78	†	N/A	Indian Air Force Antonov An-12 crash	Antonov An-12	Leh, India	1978-11-19
1	72	73		14	Western Airlines Flight 2605	McDonnell Douglas DC-10-10	Mexico City, Mexico	1979-10-31
1	0	1		2 (all on aircraft)	Ozark Air Lines Flight 650	McDonnell Douglas DC-9-31	Sioux Falls, South Dakota, U.S.	1983-12-20
1	136	137		28 (27 on aircraft)	Delta Air Lines Flight 191	Lockheed L-1011-385-1 TriStar	Dallas/Fort Worth International Airport, Texas, U.S.	1985-08-02
1	6	7	†	0	US Air Force (60-0361) crash	Boeing KC-135A-BN Stratotanker	Fairchild Air Force Base, near Spokane, Washington, U.S.	1987-03-13
1	0	1	1*	0	Belgium MiG-23 crash	Mikoyan-Gurevich MiG-23	Kortrijk, Belgium	1989-07-04
1	2	3	†	1	Panavia Tornado GR1 crash	Panavia Tornado GR1	140 miles West of Masirah Island, Oman	1991-01-13
1	124	125	†	0	Baikal Airlines Flight 130	Tupolev 154M	Irktusk, Russia	1994-01-03
1	4	5	†	2	Fine Air Flight 101	Douglas DC-8-61F	Miami, Florida, U.S.	1997-08-07
1	0	1		12 (three on aircraft)	Southwest Airlines Flight 1248	Boeing 737-7H4	Chicago, Illinois, U.S.	2005-12-08
1	1	2	†	2	Piper PA-28-181 Archer IIcrash	Piper PA-28-181 Archer II	Madha, Musandam, Oman	2006-08-29
1	49	50	†	4	Colgan Air Flight 3407	Bombardier DHC8-402 Q400	Clarence Center, New York, U.S.	2009-02-12
1	1	2	†, ‡	13	Austin suicide attack	Piper PA-28 Cherokee	Austin, Texas, U.S.	2010-02-18
1	1	2		10 (nine on aircraft)	Air Bagan Flight 11	Fokker 100	Heho, Myanmar	2012-12-25
1	1	2	†	12	Vauxhall helicopter crash	Agusta AW109	Vauxhall, London, U.K.	2013-01-16
1	0	1		39 (32 on aircraft)	Emirates Flight 521	Boeing 777-300	Dubai International Airport, United Arab Emirates	2016-08-03
1	4	5	†	0	Piper Cheyenne II Tires crash	Piper PA-31T Cheyenne II	Tires, São Domingos de Rana, Portugal	2017-04-17
1	1	2	1*	2 (one on aircraft)	BAE Hawk Mk 166 crash	BAE Hawk Mk 166	near RAFO Masirah, Masirah Island, Oman	2018-01-04
1	0	1		18 (all on aircraft)	Utair Flight 579	Boeing 737-8AS	Sochi International Airport, Russia	2018-09-01
1	97	98		9 (two on aircraft)	Pakistan International Airlines Flight 8303	Airbus A320-214	near Jinnah International Airport, Karachi, Pakistan	2020-05-22
1	3	4	†	0	Hattiesburg plane crash	Mitsubishi MU-2	Hattiesburg, Mississippi, U.S.	2021-05-05
1	0	1		3	National Aerobatic Team Aermacchi MB-339 crash	Aermacchi MB-339	Caselle Torinese, Italy	2023-9-16
1	0	1	1*	0	Bentong helicopter crash	Bell 206	Bentong, Pahang, Malaysia	2025-02-06
1	1	2	†	1	Korschenbroich plane crash	Beechcraft Bonanza	Korschenbroich, North Rhine-Westphalia, Germany	2025-05-31
1	0	1		1 (on aircraft)	Frontier Airlines Flight 4345	Airbus A321neo	Denver, Colorado	2026-05-08

== See also ==
- List of accidents and incidents involving commercial aircraft
- List of accidents and incidents involving general aviation
- Lists of accidents and incidents involving military aircraft
- List of deadliest aircraft accidents and incidents
