= Green Ramp disaster =

1994 collision of U.S. Air Force aircraft at Pope Field, North Carolina

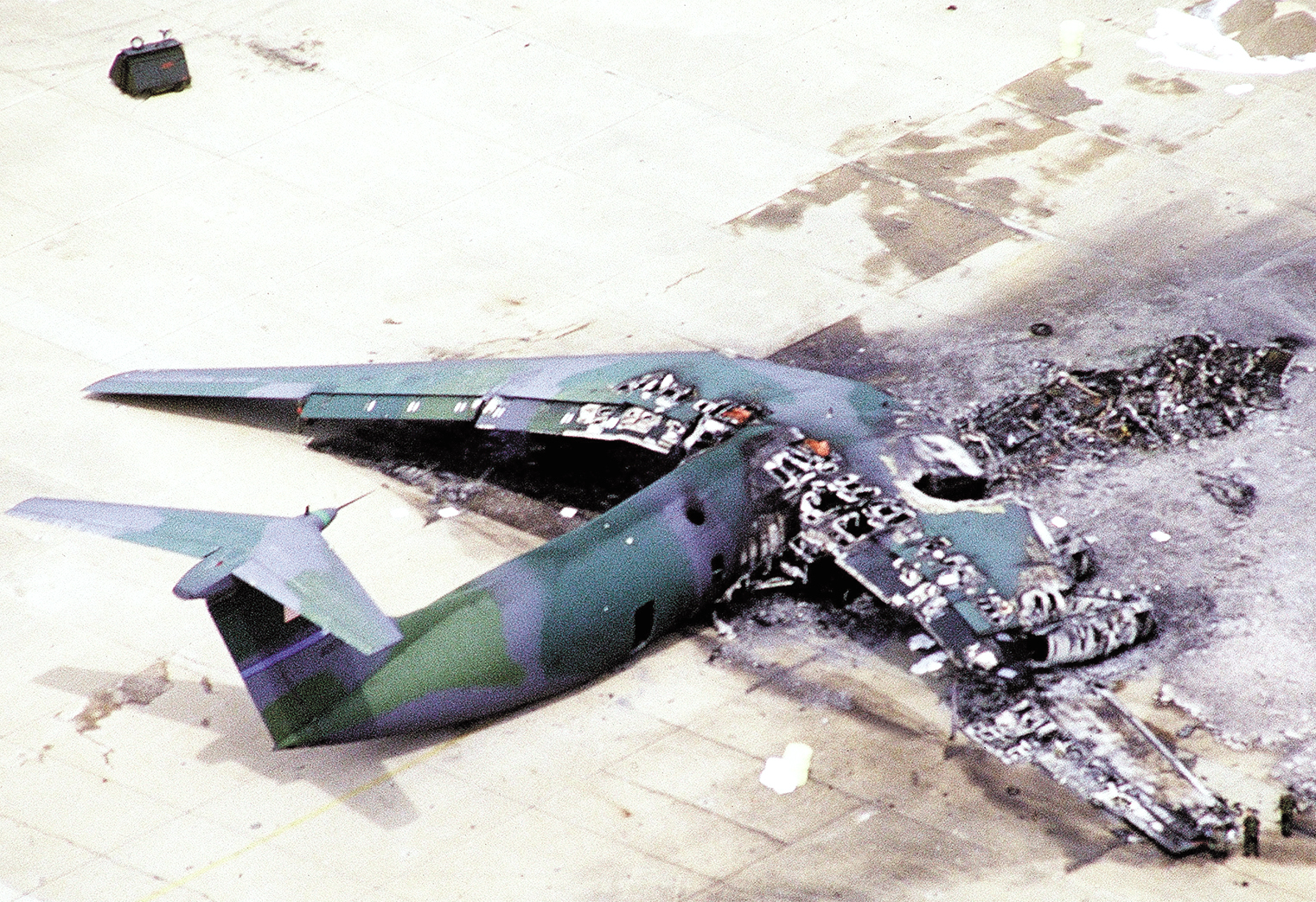
- Wreckage of the parked Lockheed C-141 Starlifter destroyed by the accident; its punctured fuel tanks contributed to the fireball.

Accident
- Date: March 23, 1994
- Summary: Mid-air collision caused by ATC and pilot error
- Site: Pope Air Force Base, North Carolina, U.S.; 35.168°N 79.025°W
- Total fatalities: 24 (on ground)
- Total injuries: 100+

First aircraft
- F-16D #88-0171 (74th FS 'FT') prior to its destruction in the Green Ramp disaster
- Type: General Dynamics F-16D Fighting Falcon
- Operator: United States Air Force
- Call sign: WEEBAD 03
- Registration: 88-0171
- Flight origin: Pope Field, North Carolina, United States
- Destination: Pope Field, North Carolina, United States
- Occupants: 2
- Crew: 2
- Fatalities: 0

Second aircraft
- C-130E #68-10942, the aircraft involved in the mid-air collision
- Type: Lockheed C-130E Hercules
- Operator: United States Air Force
- Call sign: HITMAN 31
- Registration: 68-10942
- Occupants: 5
- Crew: 5
- Fatalities: 0
- Survivors: 5

Third aircraft
- C-141B #66-0173, the parked aircraft destroyed on the ground
- Type: Lockheed C-141B Starlifter
- Operator: United States Air Force
- Registration: 66-0173
- Occupants: 0

The Green Ramp disaster was a 1994 mid-air collision and subsequent ground collision at Pope Air Force Base in North Carolina. It killed twenty-four members of the U.S. Army's 82nd Airborne Division preparing for an airborne training operation.

As of 2026, this incident has the largest number of ground fatalities for an accidental crash of an aircraft on U.S. soil. It was also the worst peacetime loss of life suffered by the division since the end of World War II.

== Accident ==
The "Green Ramp" is the large north-south parking ramp at the west end of Pope AFB's east-west runway, used by the U.S. Army to stage joint operations with the Air Force. Several buildings sit along its western edge, including Building 900, the building housing the Air Force operations group. A personnel shed ("pax shed", a large open-bay building) sat next to Building 900, which the Army used to prepare troops for parachute drops. A large grassy area, where troops could stage before drops, lay between the two buildings. Behind the area, several concrete mock-ups of the backs of Air Force cargo aircraft had been constructed, where troops could rehearse their drop procedures.

On the day of the accident, about 500 paratroopers of the 82nd Airborne Division from the adjacent Fort Bragg were in the pax shed, concrete mock-ups, and grassy area. The personnel came from three 82nd Airborne units: the First Brigade, 504th Infantry Regiment, and 505th Infantry Regiment. While the jumpers prepared to board several C-130 Hercules and C-141 Starlifter aircraft parked on Green Ramp, the sky was filled with F-16 Fighting Falcon, A-10 Thunderbolt II, and C-130 aircraft conducting training.

=== Mid-air collision ===
Shortly after 14:00 (local time EST) on Wednesday, March 23, 1994, a two-seat F-16D Fighting Falcon (AF Ser. No. 88-0171, c/n 1D-25, of the 74th Fighter Squadron, 23rd Operations Group) with two crew (Captains Joseph Jacyno and Scott Salmon) on board was conducting a simulated flameout (SFO) approach when it collided with a C-130E Hercules (AF Ser. No. 68-10942, c/n 4322, of the 2nd Airlift Squadron, 317th Group) crewed by Captain Jose Raices, Lieutenant Adam Zaret, and Sgt. Joel Myers. Both aircraft crews were members of the 23rd Wing, which was the host unit at Pope AFB at the time.

The aircraft were on short final approach to runway 23 at an altitude of about 300 feet (90 m) above ground level. The nose of the F-16D severed the C-130E's right elevator. On impact, the F-16 pilot applied full afterburner to try to recover the aircraft, but it began to disintegrate, showering debris on the runway and a road that ran around it. Both F-16 crew members ejected, but their aircraft, still on full afterburner, continued on an arc towards Green Ramp. At the same time, the C-130 crew took their aircraft away from the airfield and checked to ensure it could safely land. While the C-130 crew knew they were most likely struck by the F-16, they had no idea how it happened or the extent of the damage. After performing their checks, the crew returned to Pope and landed on the debris-littered runway.

=== Ground collision ===
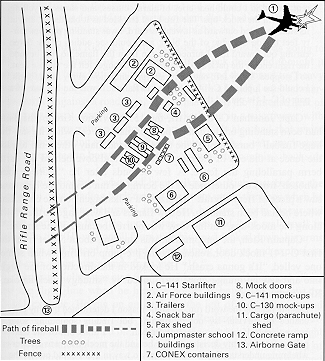
Diagram of the Green Ramp area and path of fireball – which occupied the width between the two dashed lines

By the time the C-130 landed, the F-16 had hit Green Ramp heading west. The aircraft struck the ground in an empty parking place between two C-130s with crews on board preparing the aircraft for departure. When the F-16 hit the ground, its momentum carried the wreckage westward through the right wing of a C-141B Starlifter (AF Ser. No. 66-0173 of the 438th Airlift Wing, McGuire Air Force Base, New Jersey) parked on the ramp.

The C-141B crew was preparing the aircraft for joint Army-Air Force operations; however, no Army troops besides the jumpmaster team had yet boarded it. The wreckage of the F-16 punctured the fuel tanks in the C-141's right wing, causing a large fireball, which combined with the F-16 wreckage and continued on a path taking it between Building 900 and the pax shed, directly into the area where the mass of Army paratroopers were sitting and standing. Twenty-three men died and more than eighty were injured; one severely burned paratrooper died more than nine months later, on 3 January 1995.

Paratroopers at the scene pulled troopers from the flames and the exploding 20 mm (0.8 in) ammunition from the F-16. First upon the scene were vehicles and medics from the Army's Delta Force, which was based adjacent to Green Ramp. Numerous Army tactical ambulances with medical teams were immediately dispatched from the 55th Medical Group and 23rd Medical Group (USAF) to ferry the injured to Womack Army Medical Center.

== Aftermath ==
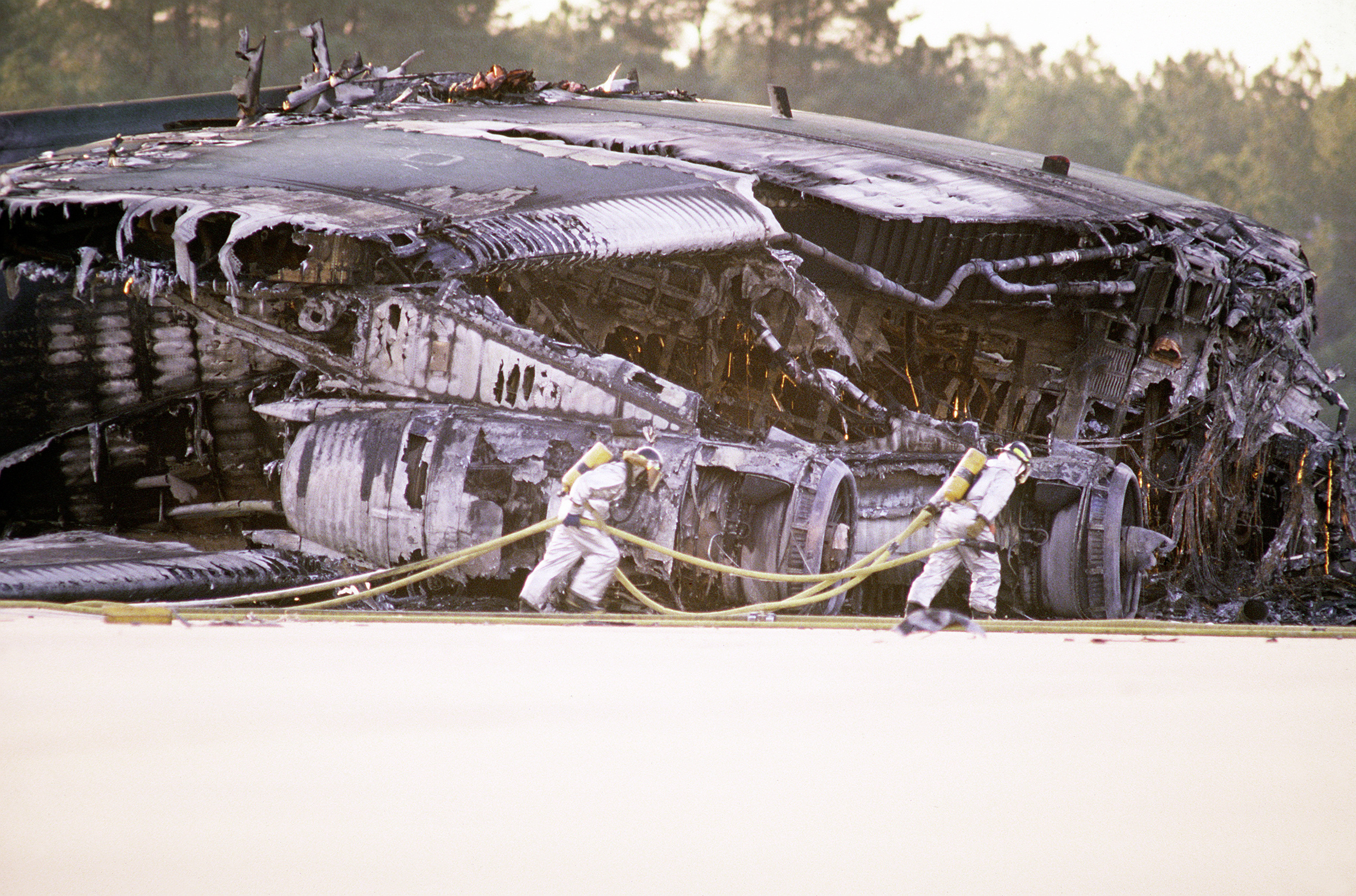
USAF firefighters drag hoses in front of the C-141 Starlifter destroyed during the disaster.

President Clinton, who was returning from the Caribbean, visited the site two days after the incident, met with the injured at Womack at Fort Bragg, thanked them for their service and said that the disaster was a tragedy for all Americans. Several of the more severely burned victims were taken to the U.S. Army Institute of Surgical Research at Brooke Army Medical Center, Texas. Two months after the accident, only one paratrooper remained critical, while the others were either in satisfactory condition or convalescing at home.

A subsequent U.S. Air Force investigation placed most of the blame for the accident on the military and civilian air traffic controllers working Pope air traffic that day. The Air Force investigation identified "multiple causes" for the midair collision, faulting air traffic control for the "majority of errors". Although the F-16 pilot was partly to blame because he did not "see and avoid and stay well clear of the mishap C-130", as required by Air Force regulations, there were extenuating circumstances.

The pilot testified that he did not see the C-130; however, after the control tower had made him aware of its presence, he began executing a low approach, when the collision occurred. Two Air Force officers involved in the crash were relieved of duty and transferred to other jobs. Three enlisted men also were disciplined. One of the enlisted controllers was later subject to Article 15 action. A later investigation stated that pilot error by the F-16 pilots also contributed to the mishap, but no disciplinary action was taken against the pilots.

== See also ==
- 1965 USAF KC-135 Wichita crash
- 1972 Sacramento Canadair Sabre accident
- Arrow Air Flight 1285
- Aeroflot Flight 593
- Ramstein air show disaster (1988)
