= 1938 Santa Ana air show disaster =

Aviation incident in Colombia

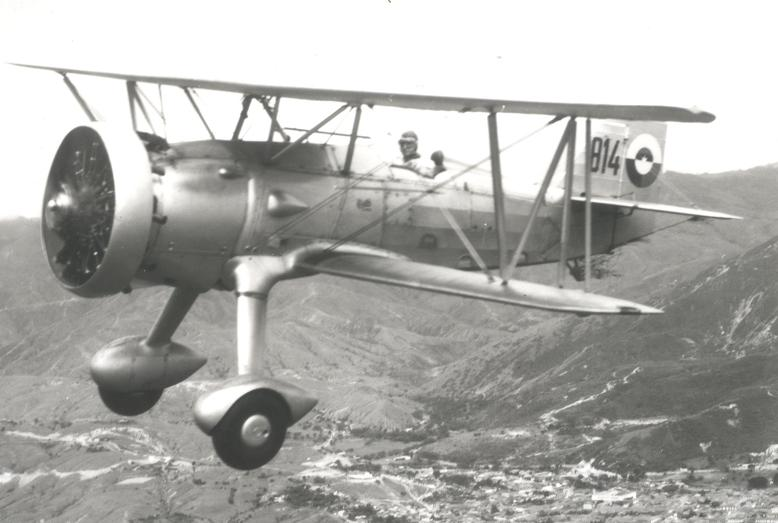
- A similar Hawk II of the Colombian Air Force

Accident
- Date: 24 July 1938
- Summary: Pilot error
- Site: Campo de Marte, Bogotá, Colombia; 04°41′07″N 074°02′15″W

Aircraft
- Aircraft type: Curtiss Hawk II
- Operator: Colombian Air Force
- Crew: 1
- Fatalities: 53 (including 52 on ground)
- Injuries: 100+ (on ground)

The 1938 Santa Ana air show disaster occurred on 24 July 1938 at a military review on the Campo de Marte in the Santa Ana district of Bogotá, Colombia. During the review, a Curtiss Hawk II biplane of the Colombian Air Force piloted by Lieutenant César Abadia performed a stunt before crashing into a grandstand and then into the crowd.

The pilot attempted to fly between the presidential stand and the stand for diplomats when he miscalculated the distance and the aircraft's wing-tip struck the diplomatic stand. The Hawk II destroyed part of the roof of the presidential stand and then careened through the crowd bursting into flames before it came to a stop upside down. Over fifty people, including civilians and soldiers were killed, and over a hundred injured. Among those in the presidential stand but uninjured were the outgoing Colombian President Alfonso López Pumarejo and his successor Eduardo Santos. Among the wounded was Misael Pastrana Borrero, a future president of Colombia.

== See also ==
- Lists of air show accidents and incidents
- Sknyliv air show disaster – another air show disaster caused by a single military aircraft and resulting in over 50 fatalities
