= 1939 Brighton Audax crash =

Aviation accident in England

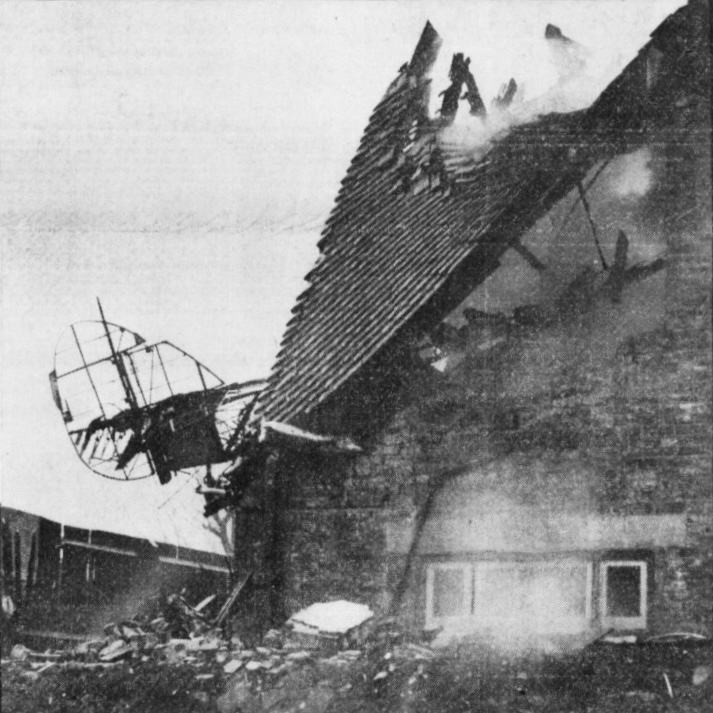
- The aftermath of the crash

Accident
- Date: 1 February 1939
- Summary: Controlled flight into terrain due to fog
- Site: Brighton, England; 50.8267°N 0.1196°W
- Total fatalities: 4
- Total injuries: 1

Aircraft
- Aircraft type: Hawker Audax
- Operator: Airports Ltd
- Registration: K7459
- Flight origin: Gatwick Airport
- Destination: RAF Tangmere
- Occupants: 1
- Crew: 1
- Fatalities: 1
- Survivors: 0

Ground casualties
- Ground fatalities: 3
- Ground injuries: 1

On 11 February 1939, a Hawker Audax aircraft, registered K7459 of the No. 19 E&RFTS, en route from Gatwick Airport near Crawley to RAF Tangmere in Tangmere crashed into a house in Brighton, England. There were four fatalities in total: the pilot, who was the sole crew member, and a mother and her two children in the house.

== Incident ==
K7459, a Hawker Audax I of the No. 19 E&RFTS from Gatwick Airport encountered dense fog; it was en route to RAF Tangmere. Its pilot became lost in the low visibility and was far off course, failing any low-flying attempts to identify local landmarks. Local residents reported hearing "the sound of a plane flying far too low". He flew over Whitehawk Hill seeking a landing place and was within 50 feet (15 m) of safety when he saw a group of Wolf Cub Scouts exercising there, so he continued to fly in order to avoid descending upon them. As he flew on he damaged some gardens, striking a greenhouse and the corner of a shed, and shaving a thick hedge's upper branches. The aircraft also struck a tree and lost one of its wheels after striking a wireless (radio antenna) mast.

Shortly before 3 p.m., the pilot crashed into the outer wall of a house on Freshfield Road in the Hanover area of Brighton. It smashed into the kitchen of one of four flats within the house and had its fuel tank torn out by the force of the impact. Bricks were scattered across the street and within seconds the tank exploded and inundated the building with flames. Emergency services were at the scene promptly, but the intense heat hampered firefighting efforts and it took an hour before the fire was controlled. A policeman was injured when a part of the roof fell and struck him.

Once the fire had been extinguished, an inspector found the body of 28-year-old Dorothy Baigent underneath an overturned stove; the bodies of her two daughters, Audrey and Gwendoline, aged 3 and 2, were lying nearby. The burnt remains of toys which the children had been playing with were found beside their bodies. It took five hours for the pilot's body to be identified as 22-year-old William Edward Brun. The plane's engine was found embedded in the kitchen wall, having been displaced by the force of the impact. The bedridden occupant of an adjoining flat, Mrs Cook, watched the whole crash in her bedroom mirror before being rescued. She was one of ten people rescued from the building uninjured. When the bodies were brought out of the house, a nun was seen praying on her knees in the road.

Following the crash, experts reconstructed the crash and found that the plane struck within 2 feet (60 cm) of a window that Baigent and her daughter, Gwendoline, were looking out of. The plane's landing gear was torn off and its fuselage drove through the wall, causing the roof to collapse. The pair were thrown against an electric stove as the fire tore through the room; however, it is believed that falling debris killed all of the victims instantly as they all had severe head injuries.

== Aftermath ==
=== Reactions ===
Residents of Brighton sympathized with the crash victims, with large crowds attending the Baigents' funeral six days later on 17 February. As the funerals started, an aircraft flew overhead in salute, and the procession route to the cemetery was lined by thousands of people. Police diverted the route up Elm Grove rather than using the customary Lewes Road route due to an estimated crowd of more than 6,000. Brun was buried the following day in Wallington, Surrey.

== See also ==
- 1938 Royal Air Force Hawker Audax crash – Airplane crash in Edmonton, London
- Brighton Blitz – Bombing of Brighton in the Second World War
