= 1965 USAF KC-135 Wichita crash =

Crash of US Air Force tanker aircraft in Kansas

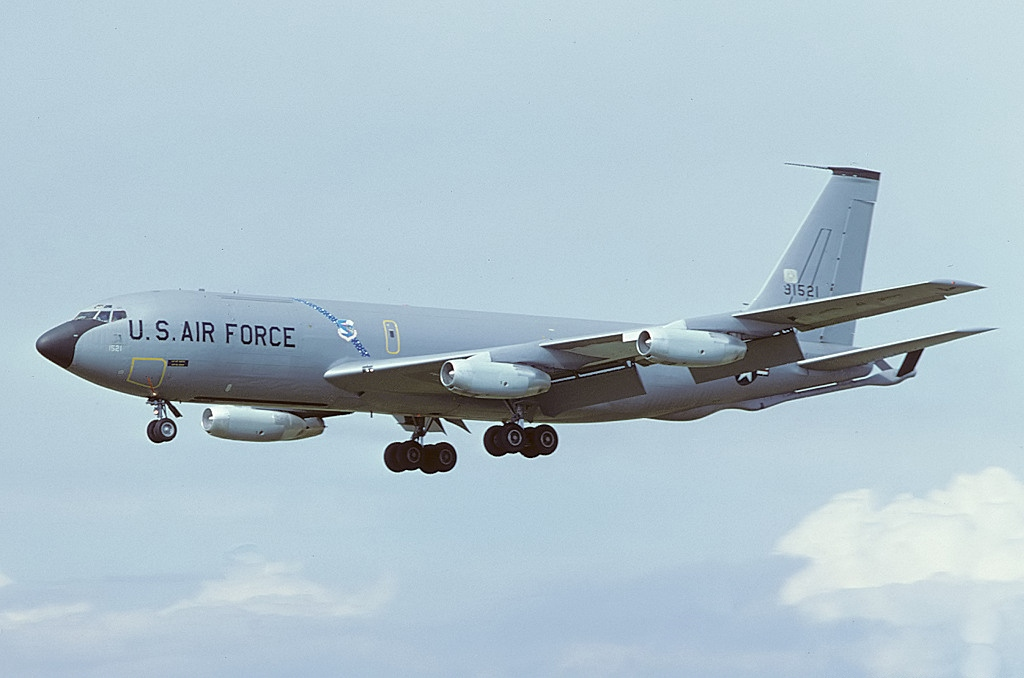
- A US Air Force Boeing KC–135A Stratotanker, similar to the accident aircraft

Accident
- Date: January 16, 1965
- Summary: Loss of control due to malfunction of rudder control system
- Site: Near McConnell AFB Wichita, Kansas, U.S.; 37.7202°N 97.3131°W
- Total fatalities: 30
- Total injuries: 27

Aircraft
- Aircraft type: Boeing KC-135A-BN Stratotanker
- Operator: United States Air Force; Strategic Air Command
- Registration: 57-1442
- Flight origin: McConnell Air Force Base
- Destination: McConnell Air Force Base
- Occupants: 7
- Passengers: 0
- Crew: 7
- Fatalities: 7
- Survivors: 0

Ground casualties
- Ground fatalities: 23
- Ground injuries: 27

On 16 January 1965, a U.S. Air Force Boeing KC-135 Stratotanker crashed in the central United States, in a neighborhood in north-eastern Wichita, Kansas, after taking off from McConnell Air Force Base. This resulted in the deaths of all seven crew members on board the aircraft and an additional twenty-three people on the ground.

This accident is the deadliest aviation disaster to occur in Kansas. It is also the second-deadliest aircraft accident in the United States involving victims on the ground, after the Green Ramp disaster in 1994, which killed 24 people on the ground.

== Accident details ==
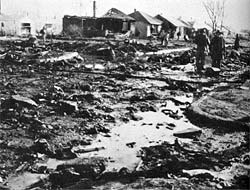
Aftermath of the crash in a neighborhood outside of McConnell Air Force Base

At 9:28 a.m. CST (3:28 p.m. UTC) on Saturday, 16 January 1965, a Boeing KC-135A-BN Stratotanker, serial number 57-1442, took off from the McConnell Air Force Base and gained very little altitude. During this time, the aircraft began to experience a large amount of yaw, and attempted to return to the airport. The crew then began to dump large quantities of fuel from the aircraft's refueling tanks. Shortly after this, the aircraft made a hard bank to the left, and began to enter a roll. Unable to recover, the aircraft crashed into a suburban neighborhood at the intersection of Piatt and 20th Street, just three minutes after take-off. The site is several blocks west of Wichita State University.

The aerial refueling aircraft was loaded with 31,000 US gallons (120,000 L) of jet fuel, and the crash resulted in a large explosion and subsequent fire, which engulfed dozens of homes. The accident killed all seven crew members on the aircraft and an additional twenty-three people on the ground. In addition, at least twenty-seven people on the ground sustained injuries, three of which were serious.

It was reported that the crew entry door was jettisoned and a B-52 Stratofortress bomber, which took off prior to the KC-135, may have blown a detached drag chute from an F-105 Thunderchief against the departing aircraft. These factors may have contributed to the crash. Recently un-redacted portions of the accident report indicate that the parachute ingested into the Number 1 engine was that of the crew member who attempted to bail out through the crew entry door. His body was found about 200 feet from the impact crater.

The aircraft and crew were based at Clinton-Sherman Air Force Base in west central Oklahoma, about 200 miles (320 km) to the southwest.

== Aftermath ==
Ten months after the accident, the U.S. Air Force issued an official accident report that stated that the crash was caused by "a rudder control system malfunction," which was impossible for the crew to overcome.

In 1971, the Piatt Memorial Park was opened to serve as a local recreational facility and a reminder of the tragedy. The park features several amenities, including a playground, a drinking fountain, and a basketball court. On July 14, 2007, more than forty-two years after the accident, an airplane-shaped twelve by twenty-two foot Imperial Black Granite monument with the names of all thirty victims of the crash inscribed on it was unveiled at a ceremony.

== See also ==
- 1972 Sacramento Canadair Sabre accident – another U.S. aircraft accident with a high number of ground fatalities
- List of accidents and incidents involving military aircraft (1960–74)
- USAir Flight 427 – a much deadlier aircraft accident also caused by a malfunction of the rudder control system
