= 1957 Turkish Air Force F-84 Thunderjet crash =

Military jet crash in Turkey

Accident
- Summary: Crashed into a housing block in the city center of Bursa. 25 houses burned down and killed 23 people.
- Site: Bursa, Turkey

Aircraft
- Aircraft type: Republic F-84G Thunderjet
- Operator: Turkish Air Force
- Registration: 51-11176
- Flight origin: Balıkesir Airport
- Crew: 2
- Fatalities: 2

Ground casualties
- Ground fatalities: 21-27
- Ground injuries: 16-18

On 25 July 1957, a Republic F-84G Thunderjet operated by the Turkish Air Force crashed in the city center of Bursa in northwestern Turkey. Up to twenty-nine people died, sixteen people were injured and twenty-five houses burned down.

== Flight and crash ==
A Republic F-84G Thunderjet (registration number 51-11176) of the Turkish Air Force departed from Balıkesir Airport on 25 July 1957. Inside were a pilot and co-pilot who were doing a training flight. After a failure there was an explosion. The pilot escaped at a low altitude with his ejection seat, but his parachute did’t open. Without the pilot, the burning jet fighter flew on and crashed into a housing block in the city center of Bursa and exploded.

Twenty-five houses, shops and hotels caught fire, four of which burned down completely. Rescue workers saved the wounded and took the bodies from the burning houses. It took several hours before the fires were extinguished.

== Victims ==
Due to the crash 23 to 29 people died, and 16 to 18 people were injured, including two who were seriously injured.

The pilot and co-pilot died due to the crash. According to the governor of Bursa, the jet's pilot was able to escape with his ejection seat. However, he didn't survive because, due to the low altitude, his parachute didn't open.

A woman who recently married died due to the crash.

The wife of the Haşal family was able to escape from one of the burning houses, but her husband and all her seven children who were younger than 15 years old died.

On 1 August 1957, one of the persons who was hospitalized recovered.

== Aftermath ==
Many families suffered financially from the crash. Those who had minor damage were to be paid within a short period of time. However, the payment of the damages of those whose houses were destroyed was postponed. In Turkish media newspapers, the opposition wrote very critically about the delays of the payments.
