= 2023 Chrcynno Cessna 208 crash =

Plane crash in Poland

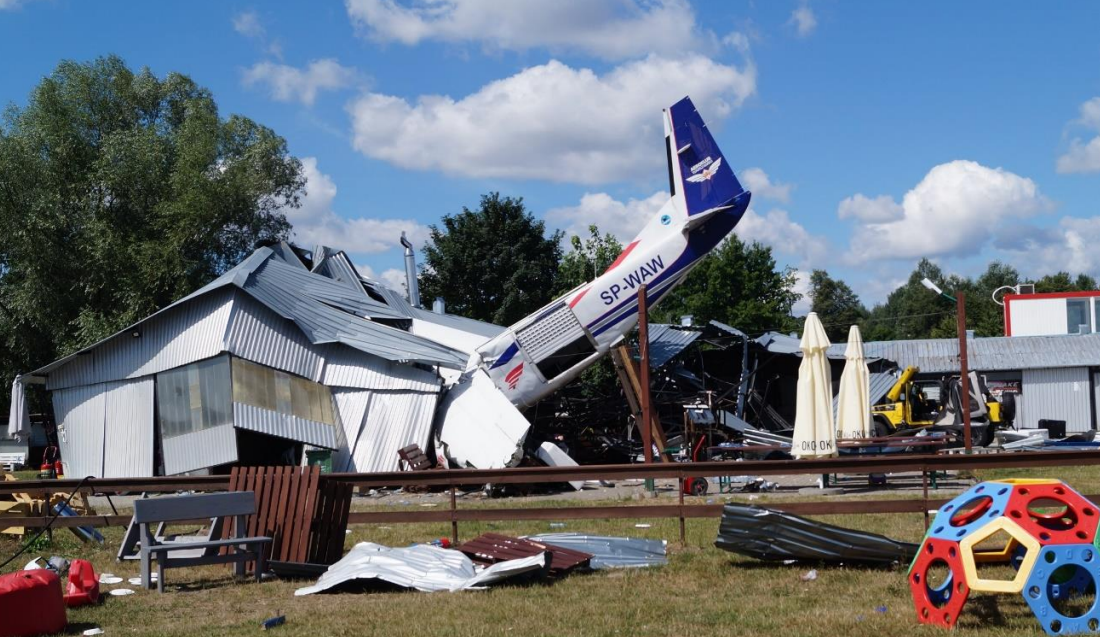
- The crash site

Accident
- Date: 17 July 2023
- Summary: Crashed during landing attempt
- Site: Chrcynno, Poland
- Total fatalities: 6
- Total injuries: 9

Aircraft
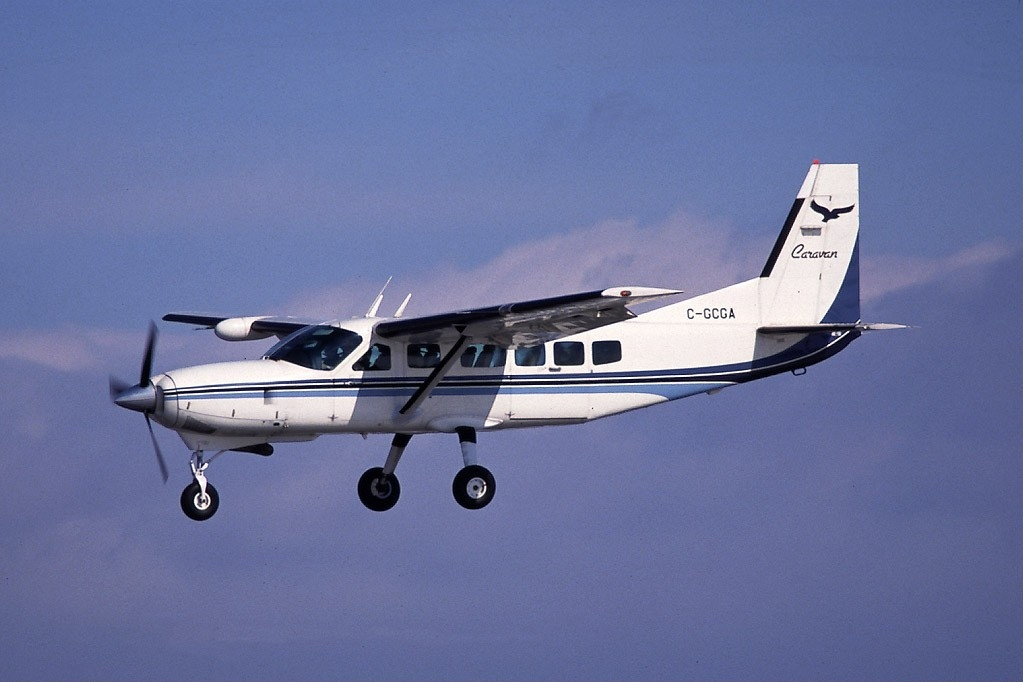
- A Cessna 208 similar to the aircraft involved
- Aircraft type: Cessna 208
- Registration: SP-WAW
- Flight origin: Chrcynno Airfield
- Destination: Chrcynno Airfield
- Passengers: 2
- Crew: 1
- Fatalities: 1
- Injuries: 2
- Survivors: 2

Ground casualties
- Ground fatalities: 5
- Ground injuries: 7

On 17 July 2023, a privately owned Cessna 208 Caravan aircraft with three people on board crashed into a hangar at an airfield in Chrcynno, Poland. Six people – the plane's pilot and five people who were inside the hangar at that time – were killed and seven others were injured. The crash was the deadliest aviation accident in Poland since 2014, when eleven people died when a Piper PA-31 Navajo crashed near Topolów.

== Accident ==
The plane involved in the accident was a Cessna 208 B (SP-WAW) operated by a privately owned company, Skydive Warsaw. It was carrying three people, a flight instructor and two pilots in training, during a training flight. At 19:40 local time (17:40 GMT), the police received a report about a small passenger plane that had crashed into a hangar near the village of Chrcynno, approximately 28 miles northwest of Warsaw.

According to the Polish State Commission on Aircraft Accidents Investigation, which is investigating the accident, the pilot lost control of the aircraft while climbing away after performing a touch-and-go maneuver, and struck a club house in which several people were sheltering due to a storm. As a result of the accident, the pilot of the plane and five people on the ground were killed, while the two trainee pilots that are passengers, survived. In addition, seven other people were injured.

== Investigation ==
The aircraft was not equipped with a flight recorder (FDR) or a cockpit recorder (CVR). Neither was required under applicable aviation regulations.
