= Sknyliv air show disaster =

2002 air show disaster in Ukraine

Coordinates: 49°49′N 23°57′E

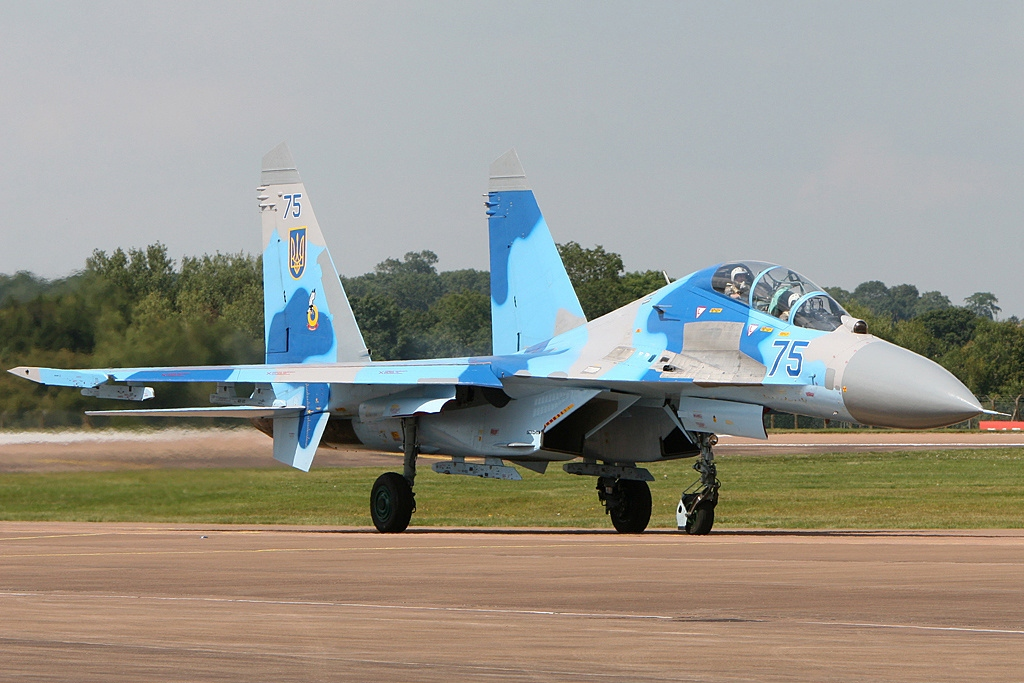
- A Ukrainian Air Force Sukhoi Su-27UB similar to the aircraft involved in the crash

Accident
- Date: 27 July 2002
- Summary: Pilot error during aerobatic maneuver
- Site: Sknyliv airfield near Lviv, Ukraine
- Total fatalities: 77 (on ground)
- Total injuries: 545

Aircraft
- Aircraft type: Sukhoi Su-27UB
- Operator: Ukrainian Air Force
- Occupants: 2
- Crew: 2
- Fatalities: 0
- Injuries: 2
- Survivors: 2

Ground casualties
- Ground fatalities: 77
- Ground injuries: 543

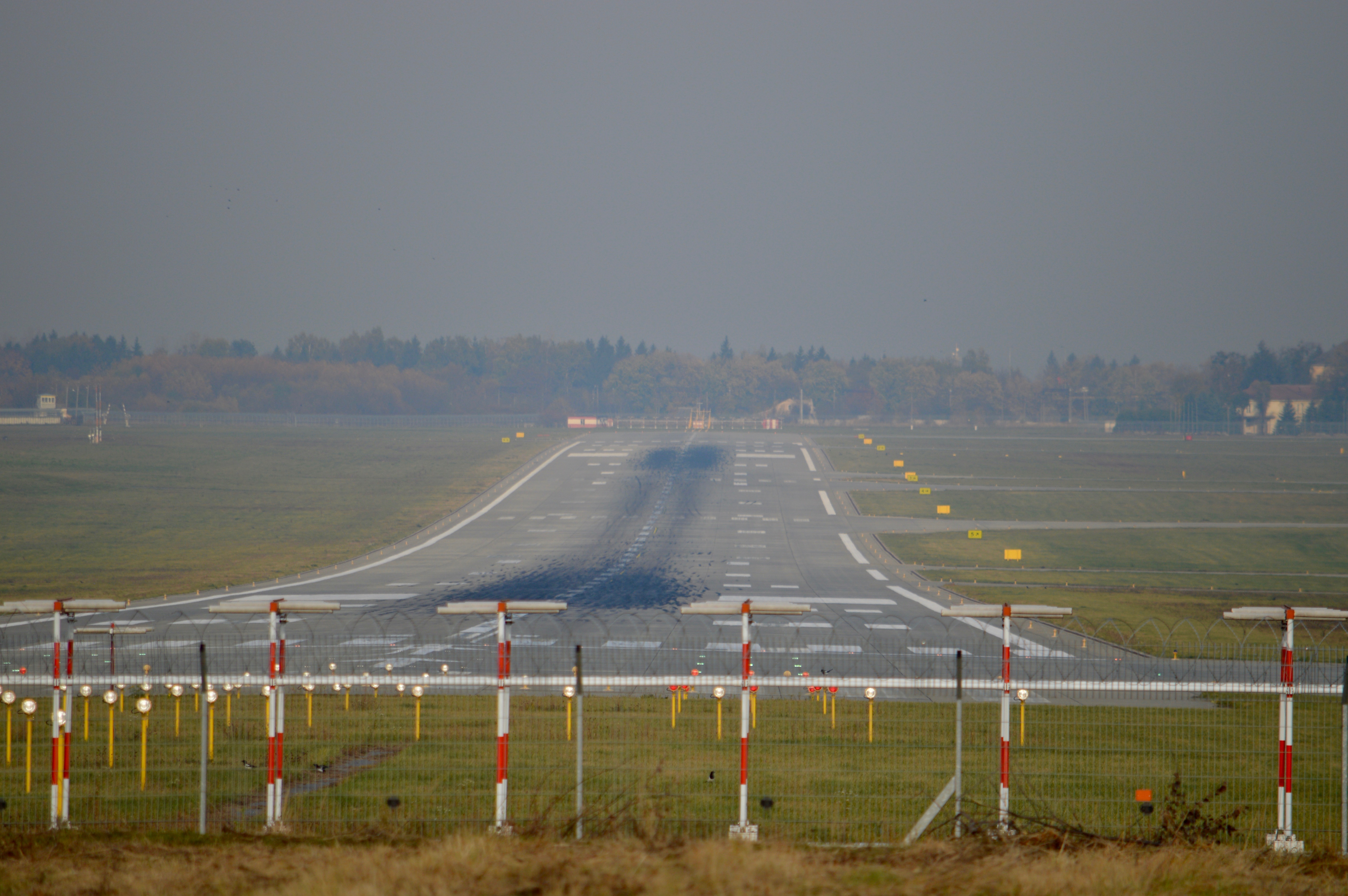
Runway of the modern-day Lviv Airport, where the accident took place

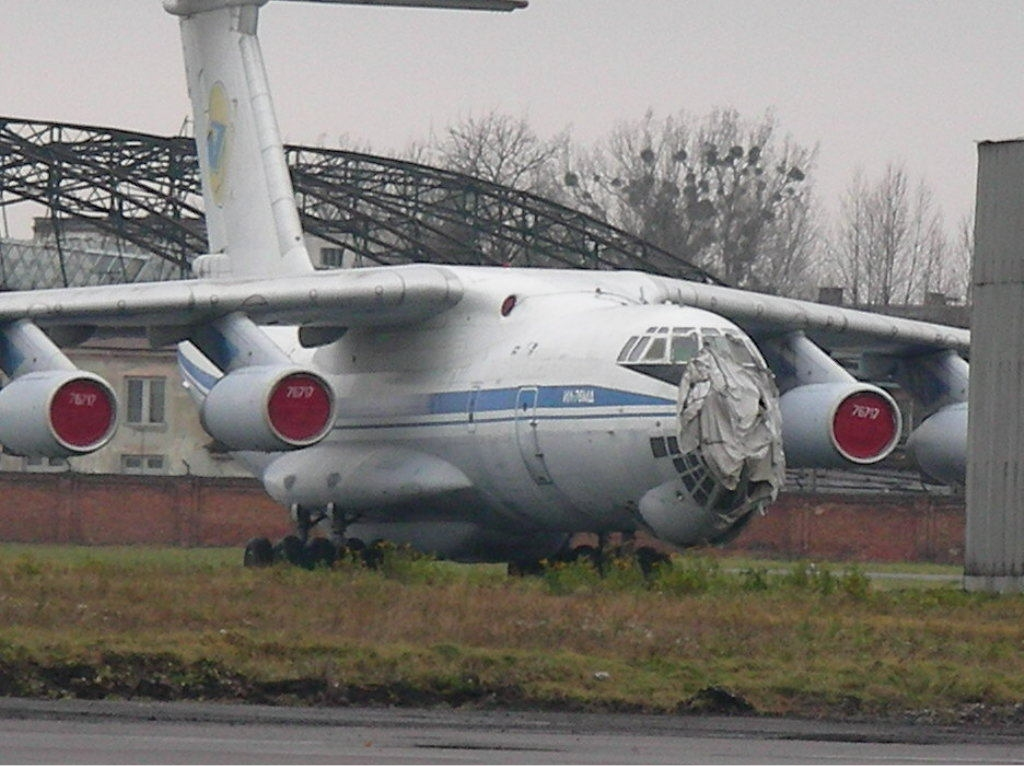
The damaged IL-76MD (UR-76717)

The Sknyliv air show disaster (Ukrainian: Скнилівська трагедія, romanized: Sknylivska trahediia, lit. 'Sknyliv tragedy') occurred on 27 July 2002, when a Ukrainian Air Force Sukhoi Su-27UB aircraft, piloted by Volodymyr Toponar (of the Ukrainian Falcons) and co-piloted by Yuriy Yegorov, crashed into spectators during an aerobatics presentation at Sknyliv airfield near Lviv, Ukraine. The accident killed 77 people and injured 543. It is the deadliest air show accident in history.

== Crash ==
More than 10,000 spectators attended the air show, staged to commemorate the 60th anniversary of the Ukrainian Air Force's 14th Air Corps. The Su-27UB aircraft, a twin-seat trainer variant of the Sukhoi Su-27, was flown by two experienced pilots; it entered a rolling maneuver at 12:52 p.m. with a downward trajectory at low altitude. It rolled upright once more and was still descending rapidly when the left wing dropped shortly before it hit the ground, at which point the crew initiated ejection. The aircraft flattened out initially, before skidding over the ground towards stationary aircraft and striking a glancing blow against the nose of an Ilyushin Il-76, at which point the jet exploded and cartwheeled into the crowd of spectators.

Both pilots survived with minor injuries, while 77 spectators were killed, including 28 children. Another 100 were hospitalized for head injuries, burns, and bone fractures. Other injuries were less severe and did not require hospitalization. A total of 543 people were injured in the accident. Some bystanders suffered serious mental trauma from what they saw.

Following the disaster, the pilots stated that the flight map which they had received differed from the actual layout. On the cockpit voice recorder, one pilot asks, "And where are our spectators?" Others have suggested that the pilots were slow to react to automated warnings issued by the flight computer.

== Aftermath ==
On 7 August, an investigation conducted by Yevhen Marchuk, the National Security and Defense Secretary, concluded with the pilots receiving a majority of the blame. In a statement, Marchuk accused Toponar and Yegorov of failing "to respect the flight plan and aerial maneuvers". Marchuk also attributed some blame toward the event organizers and scrutinized them for allowing dangerous stunts to be performed in close proximity to spectators. Toponar rejected Marchuk's findings and claimed that technical issues and a faulty flight plan was what led to the crash. Prior to the incident, he had requested an additional training flight at the airfield where the display was to be performed, but the request was denied.

Ukrainian President Leonid Kuchma publicly blamed the military for the disaster and dismissed the head of the air force, General Viktor Strelnykov. Minister of Defense Volodymyr Shkidchenko offered his resignation, but Kuchma rejected it.

=== Prosecution ===
On 24 June 2005, a military court sentenced pilot Volodymyr Toponar and co-pilot Yuriy Yegorov to fourteen and eight years in prison, respectively. The court found the two pilots and three other military officials guilty of failing to follow orders, negligence, and violating flight rules. Two of the three officials were sentenced to up to six years in prison; the third received up to four years. Toponar was ordered to pay ₴7,200,000 (equivalent to about US$1,405,000 at the time and US$2,316,000 currently) in compensation to the families, and Yegorov ₴2,500,000 (equivalent to about US$488,000 at the time and US$804,000 currently). The crew's main flight trainer was acquitted for lack of evidence.

After the verdict was announced, Toponar said that he planned to appeal, insisting that the crash was due to technical problems and a faulty flight plan. Yegorov was released in 2008 after President Viktor Yushchenko issued a decree reducing his sentence to three and a half years.

Near the end of his prison term, Toponar reasserted his innocence in a phone interview. "From the mission briefing it is obvious that the flight area parameters we were given significantly exceeded the safe margin of separation from spectators. What happened is the fault of organizers. Planes must not fly over spectators. During the show, I had to make several advanced maneuvers in a few minutes. During the half-barrel, I noticed decreased thrust of both engines and the airspeed fell. But the cause remains unknown! Ground control ordered us to continue the flight. During the last maneuver—‌an oblique loop with a turn—‌the plane became uncontrollable. During the trial they said it was caused by pilot error due to inexperience. I have 27 years in the cockpit with 2,000 hours flying time. I was a member of the Ukrainian Falcons […] To the last I struggled to lift the plane, [but] copilot Yuriy Yegorov hit the catapult [triggering ejection] and we two ejected with our seats."

== In popular culture ==
The disaster forms the backdrop of an episode in Victoria Amelina's Дім для Дома. The main characters of the novel (one of whom is a retired Soviet military pilot) attend the air show and witness the disaster, but none of them are injured.

== See also ==
- Lists of air show accidents and incidents
