= Chrcynno =

- Village
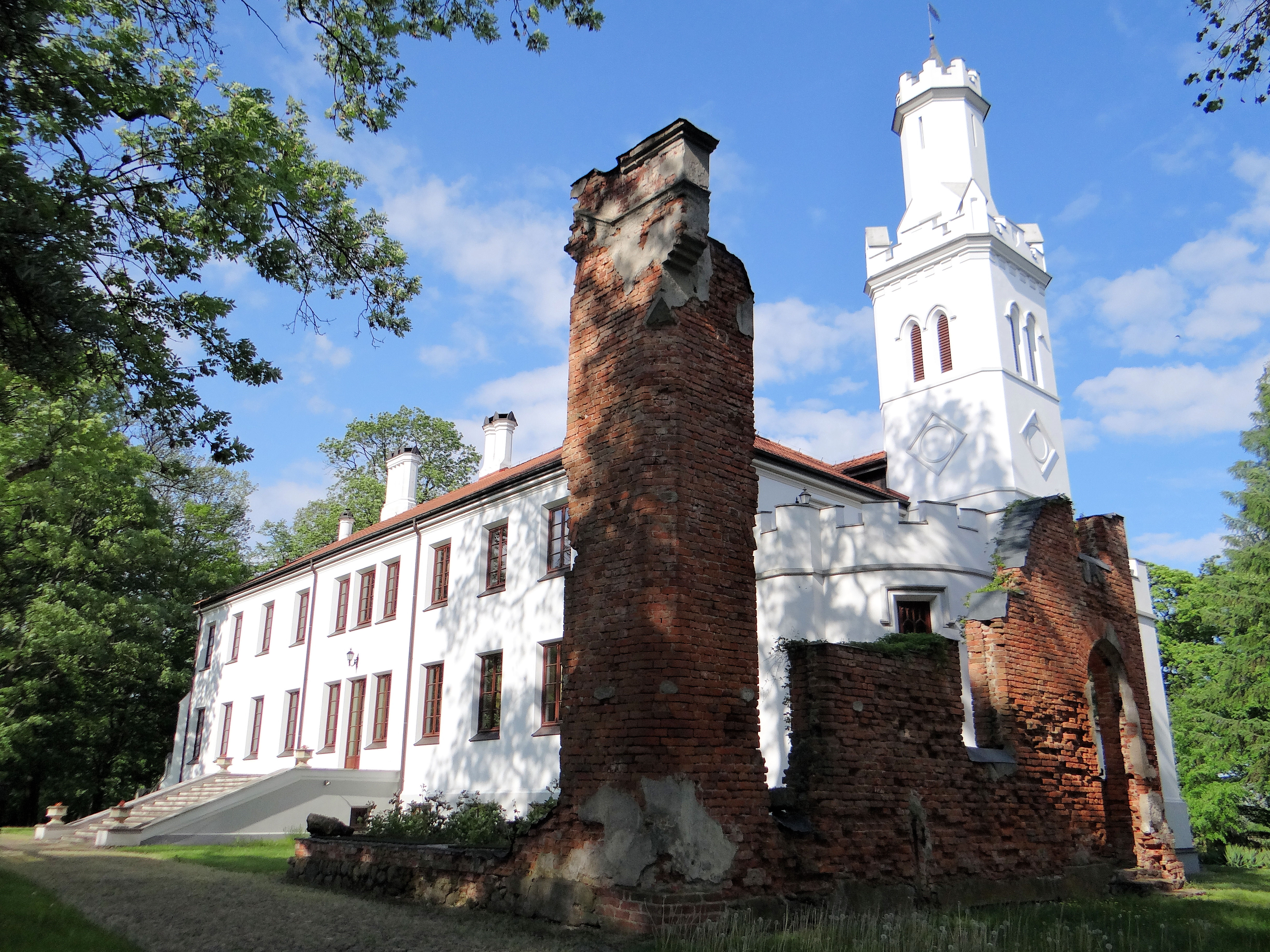
- Manor house in Chrcynno

- Location within Poland
- Coordinates: 52°34′N 20°52′E
- Country: Poland
- Voivodeship: Masovian
- County: Nowy Dwór
- Gmina: Nasielsk
- Established: 16th century
- Time zone: UTC+1 (CET)
  - Summer (DST): UTC+2 (CEST)
- Vehicle registration: WND

Chrcynno [ˈxrt͡sɨnnɔ] is a village in the administrative district of Gmina Nasielsk, within Nowy Dwór County, Masovian Voivodeship, in east-central Poland.

== History ==
The village was founded in the 16th century. In 1827, it had a population of 143.

It was the site of the 2023 Chrcynno Cessna Grand Caravan crash.
