= 1938 Royal Air Force Hawker Audax crash =

Airplane crash in Edmonton, London

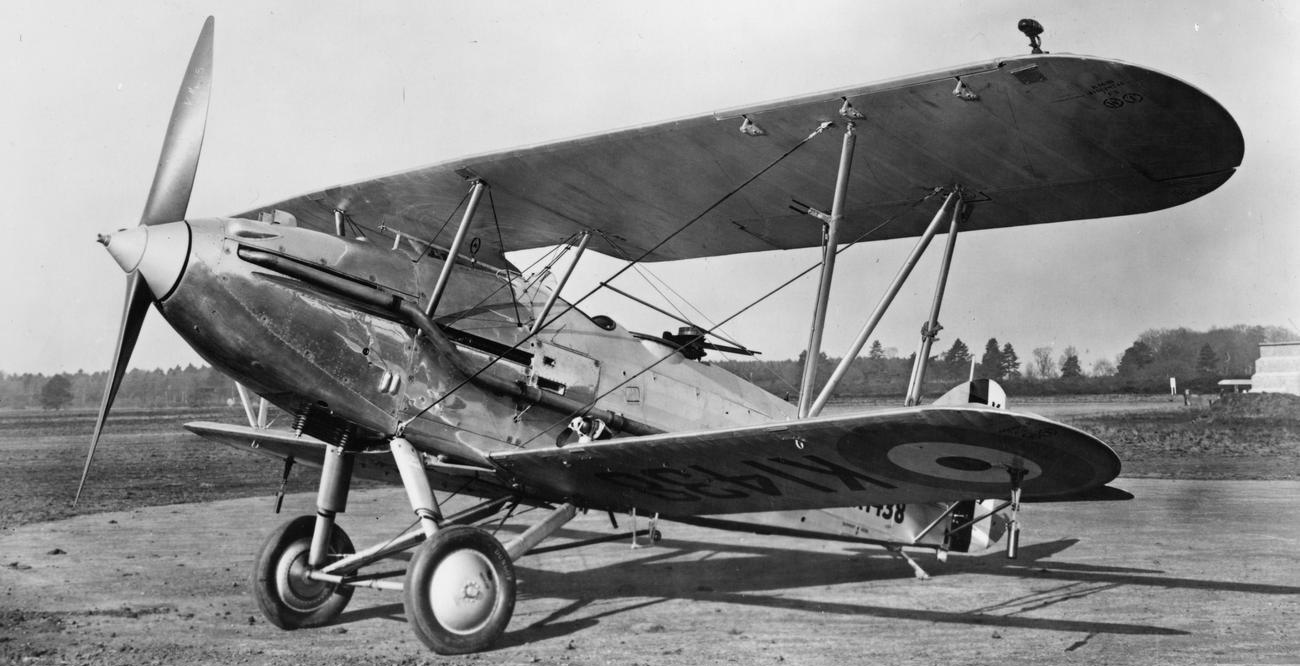
- A Hawker Audax similar to the accident aircraft

Accident
- Date: 4 September 1938
- Summary: Controlled flight into terrain due to pilot error.
- Site: Edmonton, London, England; 51°37′20.04″N 0°4′8.12″W
- Total fatalities: 13
- Total injuries: 17
- Total survivors: 0

Aircraft
- Aircraft type: Hawker Audax
- Operator: Royal Air Force
- Registration: K7381
- Occupants: 1
- Crew: 1
- Fatalities: 1
- Survivors: 0

Ground casualties
- Ground fatalities: 12
- Ground injuries: 17

The Edmonton air crash occurred on 4 September 1938. A Hawker Audax (serial number K7381) of No. 1 Elementary and Reserve Flying Training School, Royal Air Force, based at Hatfield, crashed into a residential area in Edmonton, Middlesex (now Greater London). The aircraft was being flown by a 19-year-old pilot, Sgt Stanley Robert Morris RAFVR. The pilot and 12 people on the ground were killed, including four children.

== Accident ==
It is thought that Morris was attempting to land the aeroplane at Pymmes Park when it hit the roof of one house, fell into the roadway, and ended up on the roof of two houses on Dunholme Road, Edmonton, setting fire to the properties and killing the pilot and six of the occupants of the two houses. The 29 injured were taken to the North Middlesex Hospital, mostly with burns; 13 were detained in hospital, where five of them subsequently died.

== Inquest and investigation ==
An inquest was held at North Middlesex Hospital on 7 September 1938, where evidence showed that the pilot was disobeying orders in flying over the area. An instructor at the Flying Training School said that Morris had been told to fly local circuits at Hatfield and should have stayed within three miles of the aerodrome. Edmonton was around 12 miles from Hatfield. The inquest heard that the aircraft had been fit to fly and had been flown by other pilots that day. Morris had also been seen on the same day low-flying contrary to his orders. The coroner returned a verdict of accidental death to all the victims.

The Air Ministry released a report on the accident stating that Morris was operating contrary to orders; not only had he flown further than three miles from the aerodrome, he was also manoeuvring at low level over a built-up area. He appears to have dived from 1,000 ft (300 m), flattened out his dive and continued to fly at low level when he lost further height and struck the roof of a house. The investigation could find no evidence of a defect in the engine or aircraft.

== Aftermath ==
Edward and James Letch, brothers who tried to rescue the pilot from the aircraft, died in hospital from burns. They were posthumously awarded the Order of the British Empire.

== Memorial ==
In 2008 a memorial stone was laid at Dunholme Road Air Disaster Memorial in Church Street Cemetery on the seventieth anniversary of the crash.
