= 1972 Sacramento Canadair Sabre accident =

1972 aviation accident in the United States

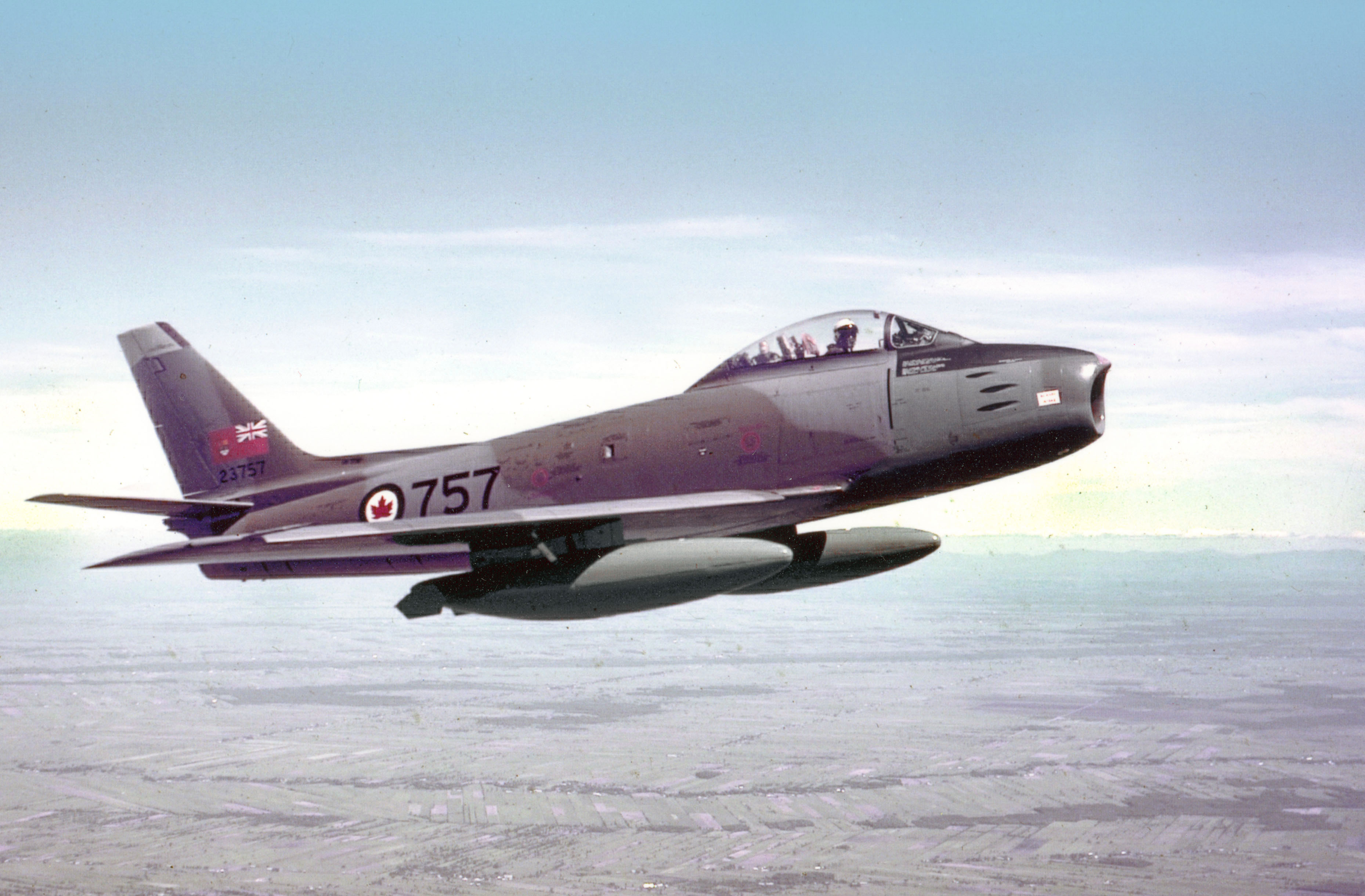
- A Canadair Sabre, similar to the aircraft involved in the accident

Accident
- Date: September 24, 1972
- Summary: Runway overrun on takeoff due to pilot error
- Site: Sacramento Executive Airport, Sacramento, California, U.S.; 38°31′16″N 121°29′57″W
- Total fatalities: 22
- Total injuries: 28

Aircraft
- Aircraft type: Canadair Sabre Mk 5
- Operator: Spectrum Air
- Registration: N275X
- Flight origin: Sacramento Executive Airport
- Destination: Oakland International Airport
- Occupants: 1
- Crew: 1
- Fatalities: 0
- Injuries: 1
- Survivors: 1

Ground casualties
- Ground fatalities: 22; 21 (direct), 1 (indirect)
- Ground injuries: 27

On September 24, 1972, a privately owned Canadair Sabre Mk. 5 fighter jet, piloted by Richard L. Bingham, failed to take off while leaving the "Golden West Sport Aviation Air Show" at Sacramento Executive Airport in Sacramento, California, United States. The airplane crashed into a Farrell's Ice Cream Parlor, killing 22 people on the ground and injuring 28, including the pilot.

== Accident ==
The crash occurred on Sunday, the second day of the air show, at approximately 4:24 pm PDT. The Canadair Sabre failed to gain sufficient altitude upon takeoff from runway 30, with eyewitnesses suggesting the nose was over-rotated. The F-86 Sabre has a dangerous and often fatal handling characteristic upon takeoff if the nose is raised prematurely from the runway. This handling characteristic of the F-86 was acknowledged from the early 1950s.

The aircraft overran the runway, struck an earthen berm, and ripped through a chain link fence. Two external underwing fuel tanks ruptured and ignited upon impact with the fence, creating a massive fireball. The plane continued across Freeport Boulevard, crashing into a moving car, and struck a Farrell's Ice Cream Parlor at around 150 miles per hour (240 km/h). Occupants of the parlor included the Sacramento 49ers junior football team.

Twenty-two people on the ground were killed; ten adults and twelve children. An eight-year-old survivor of the accident lost nine family members: both parents, two brothers, a sister, two grandparents, and two cousins. A family of four also died in the accident. Two people were killed in the car struck on Freeport Boulevard. Immediately after the crash, an elderly couple trying to cross the street to the crash site were struck by a vehicle, killing the wife. Had either the external fuel tanks not ruptured prior to impact or the aircraft not been slowed by hitting the moving car and other vehicles parked in front of the restaurant, the accident could have claimed many more lives. Bingham, the pilot, suffered a broken leg and arm.

== Aircraft ==
The Canadair Sabre was a single-engine jet fighter built for the Royal Canadian Air Force in 1954. This Sabre was withdrawn from service in 1961 and placed in long-term storage. It was sold as surplus in the United States in 1971 and was bought by Spectrum Air, Inc., of Novato, California, in the same year.

== Aftermath ==
The National Transportation Safety Board (NTSB) concluded that the accident was the result of pilot error as a result of the pilot's lack of experience on the aircraft. Bingham had logged fewer than four hours of flying time in the Sabre. The Federal Aviation Administration (FAA) modified the rules governing the flight of ex-military jets over densely populated areas and mandated clearance for such flights. Pilot requirements were also tightened: they would require a checkout by the manufacturer or military, and take-offs and landings would have to be observed by an FAA inspector to confirm proficiency.

The Firefighters Burn Institute was instituted a year after the accident, funded from donations and special payroll deductions from local firefighters.

There were at least 26 active lawsuits stemming from the crash, seeking awards for relatives of the dead and for those injured. The trial began on October 26, 1975, with defendants including the aircraft owner, pilot, the City of Sacramento, Sacramento County, the State of California, Farrell’s, and the company’s architect. The aircraft owner, William Penn Patrick, died in the crash of another surplus military plane less than a year after the Sacramento tragedy, and his estate was a party in the suit. Settlements in the amount of five million dollars were awarded in May 1976.

== Memorial ==
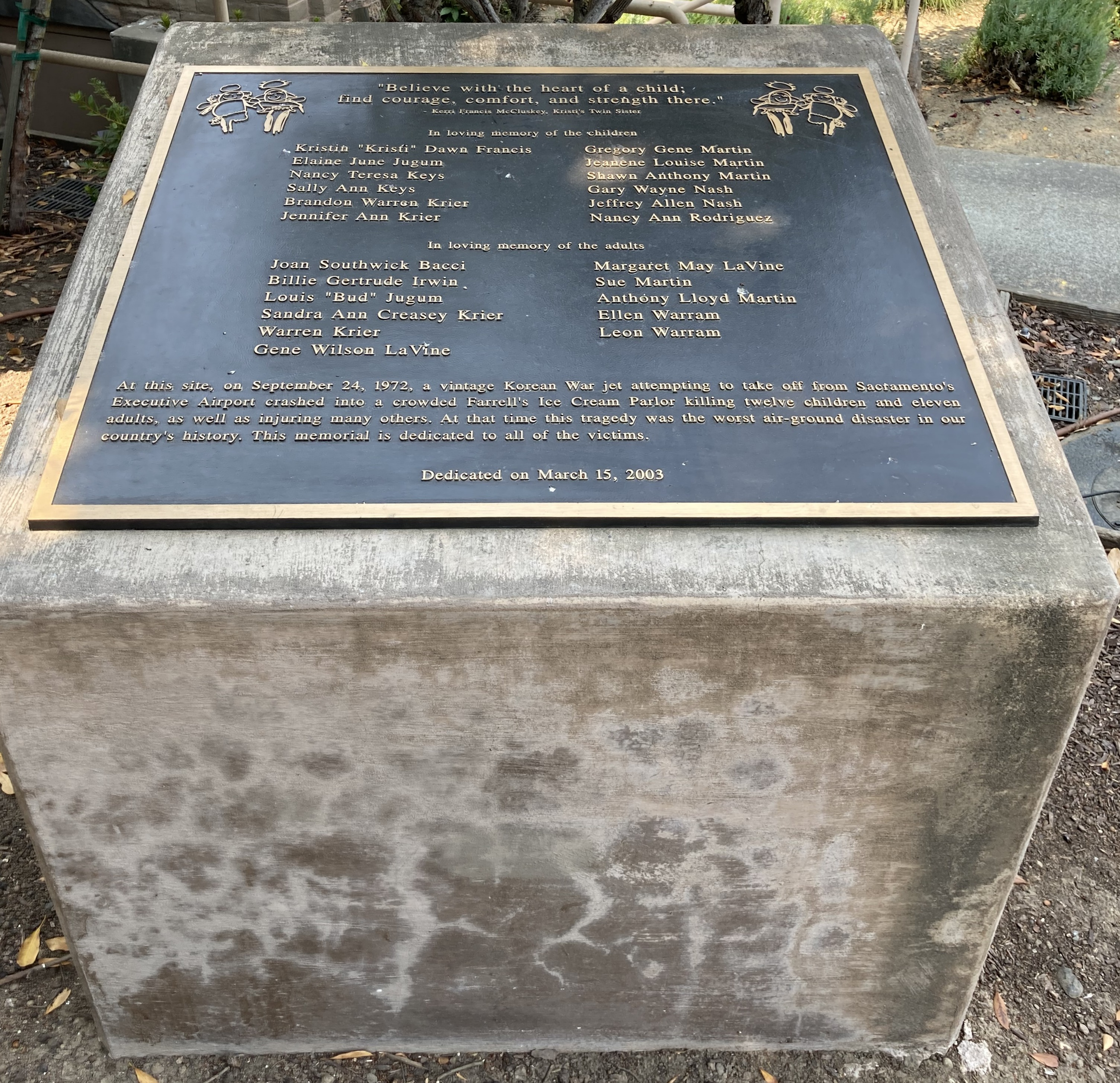
The memorial plaque, dedicated in 2003, to the victims of the accident

In 2002, a memorial was built at the site of the accident (now part of Freeport Square Shopping Center) and dedicated in March 2003. It consists of a rose garden with two benches, a fountain, a concrete marker, and two metal plaques with the names of those who died.

In 2012, a service to commemorate the 40th anniversary was held to remember the victims of the accident.

== See also ==
- 1987 Indianapolis Ramada Inn A-7D Corsair II crash
- 2008 San Diego F/A-18 crash
- 2002 Pirelli Tower airplane crash
