= 1987 Indianapolis Ramada Inn A-7D Corsair II crash =

Aircraft accident in Indianapolis, Indiana

Ramada Inn A-7D Corsair II Crash
- Aerial view of the crash site

Accident
- Date: October 20, 1987
- Summary: In-flight engine failure
- Site: Indianapolis International Airport, Indianapolis, Indiana; 39°43′52″N 86°15′18″W
- Total fatalities: 10 (All in the Ramada Inn)

Aircraft
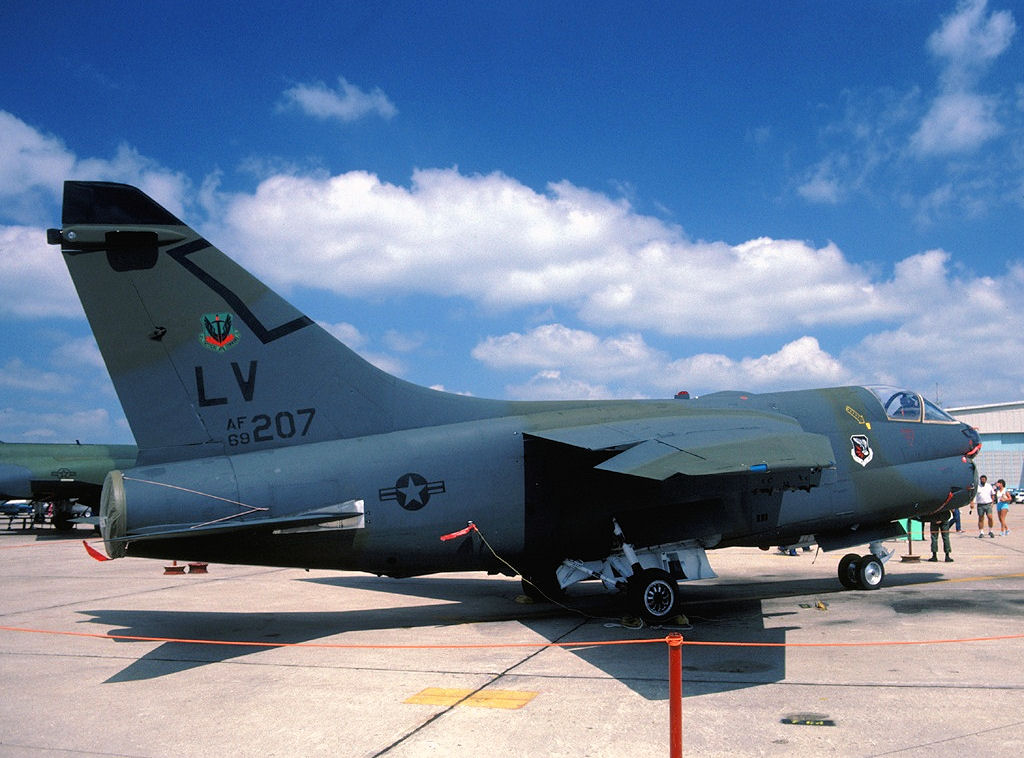
- 69-6207, the aircraft involved in the accident
- Aircraft type: A-7D Corsair II
- Operator: United States Air Force
- Registration: 69-6207
- Flight origin: Pittsburgh International Airport, Pennsylvania
- Stopover: Tinker Air Force Base, Oklahoma
- Destination: Nevada (airport not named)
- Occupants: 1
- Passengers: 0
- Crew: 1
- Fatalities: 0
- Injuries: 1
- Survivors: 1

Ground casualties
- Ground fatalities: 10

The Ramada Inn crash was an aircraft accident in which a United States Air Force pilot failed to reach the runway at Indianapolis International Airport and crashed into the Airport Ramada Inn in Indianapolis, Indiana.

== Accident summary ==
On the morning of October 20, 1987, a United States Air Force A-7D-4-CV Corsair II, serial 69-6207, piloted by Major Bruce L. "Lips" Teagarden, 35, was en route to Nevada via Tinker Air Force Base, Oklahoma, after departing Pittsburgh International Airport earlier in the day. At 9:11 a.m., Teagarden notified controllers at Indianapolis International Airport that his aircraft had sustained some sort of engine failure about 15 miles (24 km) southwest of the city at around 31,000 feet and he was returning to Indianapolis to attempt an emergency landing. Controllers at Indianapolis routed Teagarden to Runway 5L, but due to the low cloud ceiling and poor visibility over Indianapolis, Teagarden was at 3,100 feet (940 m) mean sea level when he came to the threshold and was forced to try to land on Runway 32 instead.

Teagarden made a right turn to head east away from the airport, but continued to drop from 3,100 feet (940 m) to 2,000 feet (610 m) just to the east of Interstate 465 at the eastern edge of the airport where controllers lost him from the radar. As his altitude dropped, Teagarden was forced to eject from the aircraft 500 feet (150 m) above ground, and the plane made a slight right turn towards the Park Fletcher business development. It struck the Bank One branch in the 5600 block of Bradbury Avenue, bounced off the roof, flew across the street and hit an embankment, went 25 feet (7.6 m) airborne, and then crashed into the front of the Ramada Inn. Teagarden landed in the parking lot of the Ace Supply Company, four blocks from the hotel, suffering bruises and muscle strain.

As the plane crashed into the Ramada Inn, the cockpit and engine went into the lobby, killing nine people immediately or within minutes; another died 10 days later from burns. The wings went into the upper floors of the top of the carport and upper floors of the hotel. The aircraft's jet fuel ignited on impact, causing a fireball that covered the front of the hotel up to the fourth floor. Indianapolis Airport crash trucks arrived on the scene a minute after impact, and firefighters used foam to bring the fire under control four minutes later. Other elements of the Airport fire department searched the building for survivors, while assistance was requested from the Indianapolis Fire Department, Wishard Ambulance Service, the Wayne Township Fire Department, and the Decatur Township Fire Department.

Meanwhile, the hotel was evacuated by Ramada Inn staff and guests.

Teagarden was assigned to the 4450th Tactical Group, which at the time was clandestinely involved with the development of the Lockheed F-117 Nighthawk.

== Aftermath ==
The Air Force paid $50,427 ($142,906.04 when adjusted for inflation) in property claims damages, according to The New York Times.

Teagarden was grounded until a flight evaluation board held him blameless in the incident because of the controller's actions.

The cause of the crash, which was revealed in the Air Force's final report in January 1988, was a defective gear in the accessory gearbox. It sheared, causing the driveshaft to rip open the lubricating oil system, and the engine seized up soon afterward. Air Force mechanics had first noticed excessive wear on the driveshafts of a Corsair in November 1984, and subsequently two others. This prompted a safety directive to check driveshaft splines during compressor work on all in-service Corsairs.

The charred building stood for more than two years; the hotel owners never rebuilt because they were unable to decide on an appropriate design. Currently, a parking lot stands on the site. The bank branch damaged by the plane is still standing today. It has been converted to a hospice and subsequently closed permanently as of 2022.
