= Lists of air show accidents and incidents =

Lists of air show accidents and incidents give lists of accidents and incidents at air shows. They include:

- List of air show accidents and incidents in the 20th century
- List of air show accidents and incidents in the 21st century
