= Lao Airlines Flight 301 =

2013 aviation accident

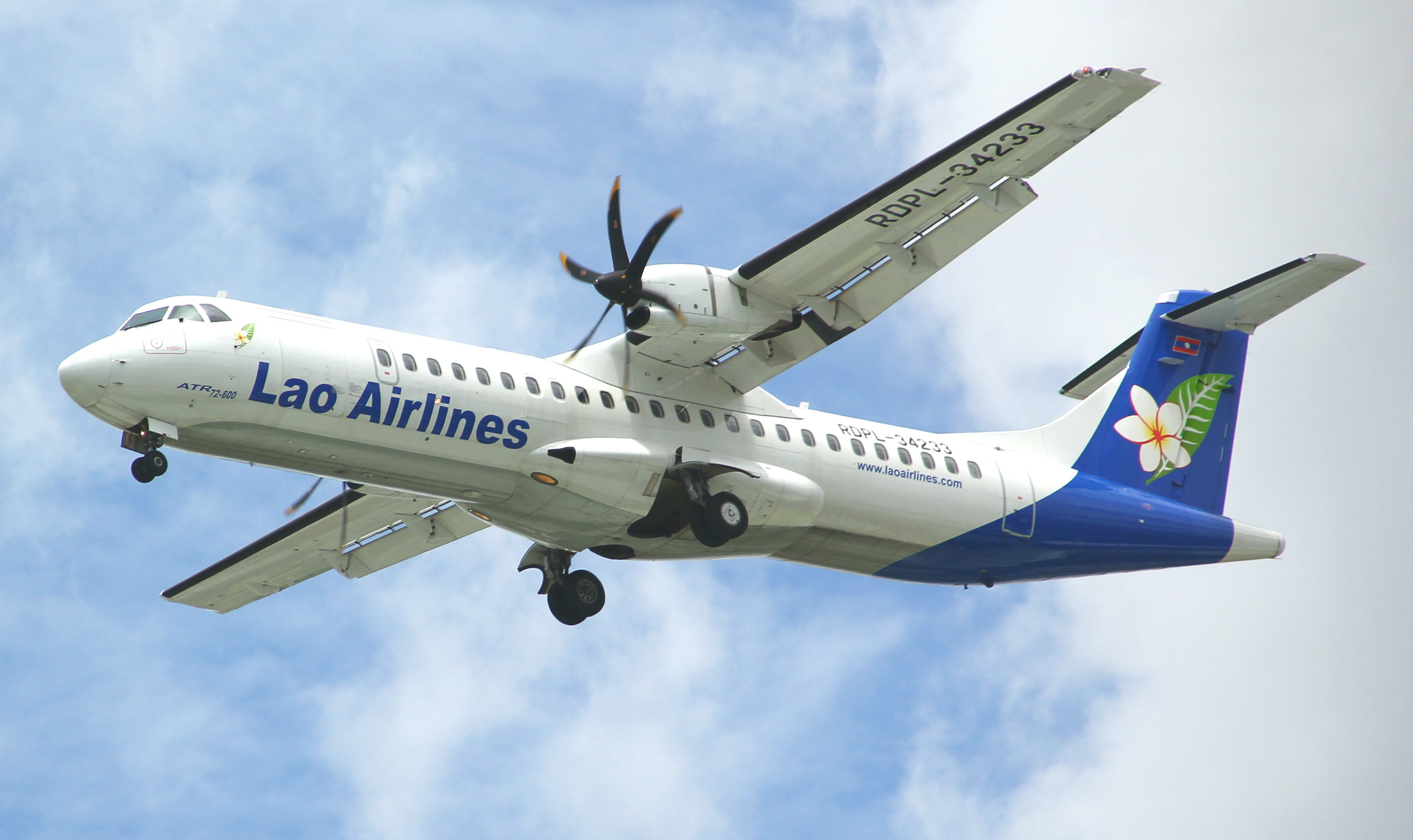
- RDPL-34233, the aircraft involved in the accident, in July 2013

Accident
- Date: 16 October 2013
- Summary: Controlled flight into terrain due to pilot error
- Site: Done Kho Island, Mekong River, Laos; 15°09′06″N 105°43′59″E

Aircraft
- Aircraft type: ATR 72-600
- Operator: Lao Airlines
- IATA flight No.: QV301
- ICAO flight No.: LAO301
- Call sign: LAO 301
- Registration: RDPL-34233
- Flight origin: Wattay International Airport, Vientiane, Laos
- Destination: Pakse International Airport, Laos
- Occupants: 49
- Passengers: 44
- Crew: 5
- Fatalities: 49
- Survivors: 0

Lao Airlines Flight 301 was a scheduled domestic passenger flight from Vientiane to Pakse, Laos. On 16 October 2013, the ATR 72-600 aircraft operating the flight crashed into the Mekong River near Pakse, killing all 49 people on board. The accident was the first involving an ATR 72-600 and the deadliest ever to occur on Lao soil.

The investigation report concluded that the probable cause of the accident was the flight crew's failure to properly execute the published missed approach procedure following an aborted landing at Pakse airport.

== Accident ==
The aircraft was operating a scheduled domestic passenger flight from Wattay International Airport, Vientiane to Pakse International Airport, Pakse, Laos. The flight departed from Vientiane at 14:45 local time (07:45 UTC) and crashed into the Mekong River at 15:55 local time (08:55 UTC) while approaching Pakse for the second time, less than 6 kilometres (3.7 mi; 3.2 nmi) from the airport. The aircraft had already gone around once due to poor weather and was in the downwind leg for another approach when it crashed into a riverbank and was deflected into the river. All five crew and 44 passengers on board were killed.

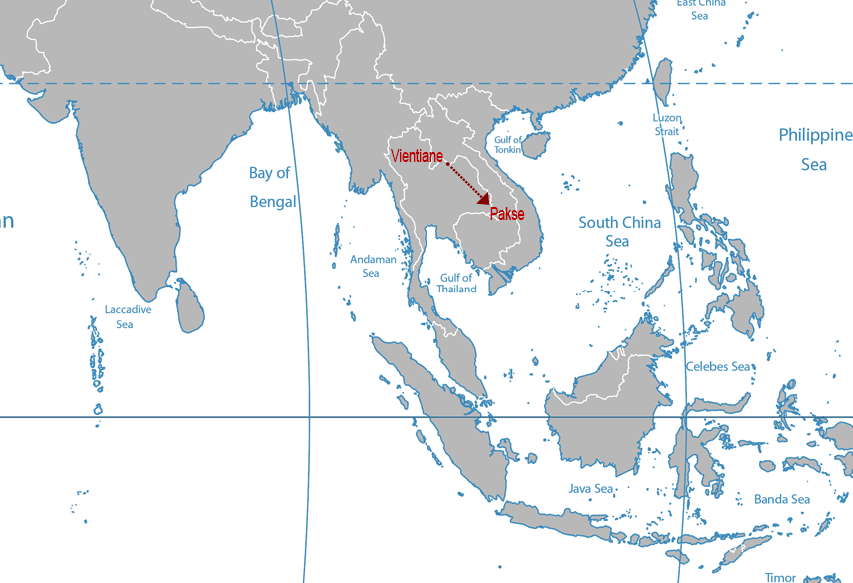
The route of flight 301, 465 km as the crow flies.

Marks on the ground indicated that the aircraft landed heavily before entering the Mekong. The weather was reported to be poor at the time of the accident due to the remnants of Typhoon Nari affecting southern Laos.

The fast-flowing, deep waters of the Mekong hampered the recovery of the victims and wreckage. To assist with the search, 50 divers from Thailand were brought in. Eighteen victims had been recovered as of 18 October. By 23 October 44 of the 49 victims had been recovered. Identification had been confirmed for 27 of them. Some of the victims were found 19 kilometres (12 mi; 10 nmi) downstream of the crash site.

== Aircraft ==
The aircraft involved was an ATR 72-600 with serial number 1071 and registered as RDPL-34233. Lao Airlines had taken delivery of the aircraft on 29 March 2013, and until the point of impact, the aircraft had logged 758 Airframe hours. It was equipped with two Pratt & Whitney PW127M engines.

== Passengers and crew ==
The victims were of eleven nationalities. Of the 44 passengers on board, 16 were Lao, as were four of the five crew. The remaining casualties consisted of seven French nationals, six Australians, five Thais, three South Koreans, three Vietnamese, and one each from China, Taiwan, Malaysia and the United States. At least two children, both from Australia, were among the dead. Early reports that a Canadian national was on board were incorrect, as it was later determined that the individual was a Vietnamese national.

Country	Passengers	Crew	Total
Laos	16*	4**	20
France	7	0	7
Australia	6	0	6
Thailand	5	0	5
South Korea	3	0	3
Vietnam	3	0	3
Cambodia	0	1	1
China	1	0	1
Malaysia	1	0	1
Taiwan	1	0	1
United States	1	0	1
Total	44	5	49

- *Including 1 dual Vietnamese-Lao citizen
- **Including 1 dual Vietnamese-Lao citizen

In command was Cambodian Captain Yong Som (57), who had logged 5,600 flying hours, of which 3,200 on the ATR-72, and the first officer was Soulisack Houvanthong (22), who had logged around 400 hours of flying experience.

== Investigation ==
The Lao Department of Civil Aviation opened an investigation into the accident. The aircraft's manufacturer ATR and the French Bureau of Enquiry and Analysis for Civil Aviation Safety (BEA) assisted them. The BEA sent four investigators to Laos.

The aircraft's wreckage was lifted from the Mekong on 22 October 2013. Within three weeks from the accident, both the flight data recorder and the cockpit voice recorder were successfully recovered from the Mekong.

According to the official investigation report, released in November 2014, the accident's probable cause was the flight crew's failure to properly execute the published missed approach procedure, which resulted in the aircraft flying into terrain. A sudden change in weather conditions and an improperly executed published instrument approach necessitated the go-around. The recordings show that the flight crew initiated a right turn according to the lateral missed approach trajectory without succeeding in reaching the vertical trajectory. Specifically, the flight crew did not follow the vertical profile of the missed approach as the missed approach altitude was set at 600 feet (180 m) and the aircraft system went into altitude capture mode. When the flight crew realized that the altitude was too low, the pilot flying over-reacted, which led to a high pitch attitude of 33°. It then struck trees. The fuselage collided with the bank and plunged into the river.

== See also ==
- Garuda Indonesia Flight 200
- Lion Air Flight 904
