= Bounced landing =

Aircraft runway landing behavior

In aviation, a bounced landing is a behavior of an aircraft that can develop after the aircraft touches the runway or water surface. It's defined as all aircraft wheels or floats briefly and sometimes repeatedly losing contact with the runway or water surface during landing.

== Types of bounced landing ==
- Overspeed bounced landing (speed-induced bounced landing) – happens due to ground effect as the aircraft approaches a landing surface at speeds exceeding normal landing speed by 10% or more.
- Ballooning (pitch-induced bounced landing) – happens due to the combination of pitch motion during touchdown and the elastic reactions of chassis struts. Can be induced by pilot inputs or ground roughness, and can happen even at normal landing speed.
- Porpoising (runaway bounced landing) – repeated bouncing with amplitude increasing with each touchdown. This is the most dangerous type of bounced landing and typically results in severe damage or complete destruction of the airframe.

== Factors favouring bounced landing ==
- Excessive airspeed at landing
- Inexperienced pilot
- Attitude errors before landing (especially excessive nose-down attitude resulting in high sink rate)
- Rough landing strip
- Attempts to fix excessive sink rate in last moments before landing
- Nose-wheel aircraft
- Cross-winds

== Bounced landing mitigation procedures ==
In general, once touched down the bounced landing mitigation procedures are ineffective, especially for inexperienced pilots. If the pilot is in control of some factors that tend to lead to a bounced landing, a go-around or touch-and-go landing can be better than attempting to land normally.

If an initial bounce has occurred but airspeed is insufficient for touch-and-go landing, the following emergency procedure should be followed:

- Do not apply full nose-down input, especially on aircraft with a nose wheel. A nose-first touchdown frequently leads to runaway bouncing. Instead, gently stabilize pitch attitude at around normal landing angle, and wait until next touchdown. If possible, reduce vertical speed prior to second touchdown with a slight nose-up input.
- In general, pitch-induced bounced landing is easier to mitigate compared to speed-induced bounced landing because the aircraft has less lift and kinetic energy available. Shed excess airspeed if possible.
- Runaway bounced landing (with at least 2 bounces after initial touchdown) is usually not recoverable. If the aircraft is equipped with a drogue parachute or a ballistic parachute, the pilot may be able to deploy it to arrest runaway bouncing.

== Notable occurrences of bounced landing ==
- Aeroflot Flight 1492
- Garuda Indonesia Flight 200
- FedEx Express Flight 80
- FedEx Express Flight 14
- China Southern Flight 3456
- Lufthansa Cargo Flight 8460

== See also ==
- Fuel dumping
- Missed approach
- Touch-and-go landing
