= China Airlines Flight 642 =

August 1999 plane crash in Hong Kong

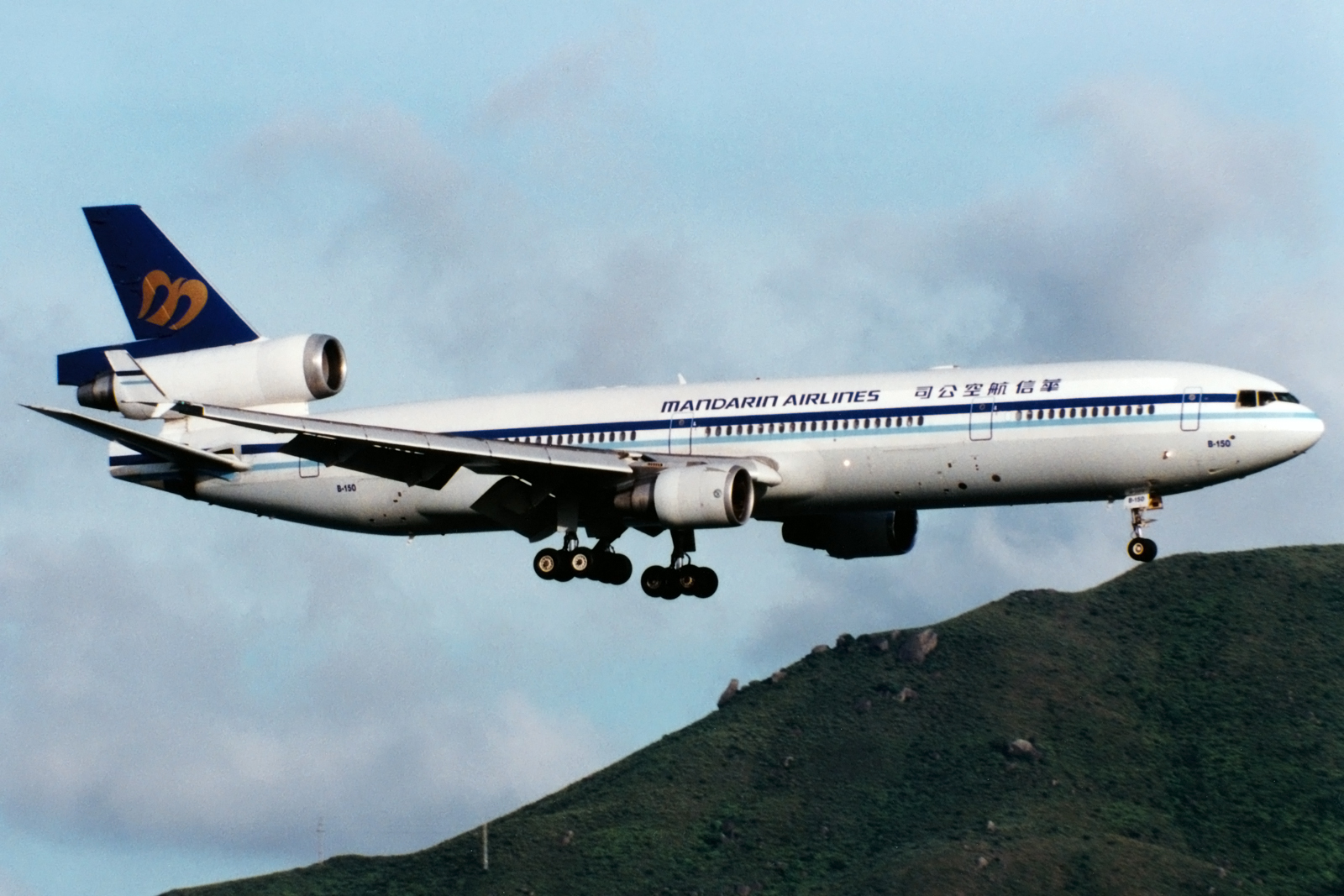
- B-150, the aircraft involved in the accident in 1998 while still in service with Mandarin Airlines

Accident
- Date: 22 August 1999
- Summary: Crashed on landing due to strong winds
- Site: Hong Kong International Airport; 22.305°N 113.922°E

Aircraft
- Aircraft type: McDonnell Douglas MD-11
- Operator: China Airlines
- IATA flight No.: CI642
- ICAO flight No.: CAL642
- Call sign: DYNASTY 642
- Registration: B-150
- Flight origin: Don Mueang International Airport
- Stopover: Hong Kong International Airport
- Destination: Chiang Kai-shek International Airport
- Occupants: 315
- Passengers: 300
- Crew: 15
- Fatalities: 3
- Injuries: 208
- Survivors: 312

China Airlines Flight 642 was a scheduled flight that crashed at Hong Kong (Chek Lap Kok) International Airport on 22 August 1999. It was operating from Bangkok (Bangkok International Airport, now renamed as Don Mueang International Airport) to Taipei with a stopover in Hong Kong.

The plane, a McDonnell Douglas MD-11 (registration B-150), touched down hard during landing, flipped over and caught fire. Of the 315 people on board, 312 survived and three were killed. It was the first fatal accident to occur at the new Hong Kong International airport since it opened in July 1998.

Flight 642 was one of only two hull losses of MD-11s with passenger configuration, the other being Swissair Flight 111, which crashed in 1998 with 229 fatalities. All other hull losses of MD-11s have been when the aircraft has been serving as a cargo aircraft.

== Aircraft and crew ==
Seating plan

The aircraft was a McDonnell Douglas MD-11 registered as B-150, which had been delivered to China Airlines in October 1992. The aircraft was powered by three Pratt & Whitney PW4460 turbofan engines. B-150 had been involved in an earlier unrelated incident as CAL012 on 7 December 1992 when moderate turbulence led to the aircraft departing normal flight, leading to it sustaining damage to its outboard elevator skin assemblies, some of which broke off from the aircraft. B-150 was then delivered to China Airlines's subsidiary Mandarin Airlines in July 1993. It was then returned to China Airlines in March 1999.

The captain was 57-year-old Gerardo Lettich, an Italian national who had joined China Airlines in 1997, and had previously flown for a major European airline. He had 17,900 flight hours, including 3,260 hours on the MD-11. The first officer was 36-year-old Liu Cheng-hsi (Note: traditional Chinese: 劉成熙; simplified Chinese: 刘成熙; pinyin: Liú Chéngxī), a Taiwanese national who had been with the Airline since 1989 and had logged 4,630 flight hours, with 2,780 of them on the MD-11.

== Summary ==
At about 6:43 P.M. local time (10:43 UTC) on 22 August 1999, the MD-11 was making its final approach to runway 25L when Tropical Storm Sam was 50 kilometres (31 mi; 27 nmi) NE of the airport. At an altitude of 700 feet (210 m) prior to touchdown, a wind check was reported to the crew, which included winds gusting 320 deg/28 knots (52 km/h; 32 mph) to 36 knots (67 km/h; 41 mph). This resulted in a crosswind vector of 26 knots (48 km/h; 30 mph) gusting to 33 knots (61 km/h; 38 mph), while the tested limit for the aircraft was 35 knots (65 km/h; 40 mph).

During the final flare to land, the plane rolled to the right, landed hard on its right main gear and the No. 3 engine touched the runway. The right wing separated from the fuselage. The aircraft continued to roll over and skidded off the runway in flames. When it stopped, it was on its back and the rear of the plane was on fire, coming to rest on a grass area next to the runway, 3,500 feet (1,100 metres) from the runway threshold. The right wing was found on a taxiway 280 feet (85 m) from the nose of the plane. As shown in photos of the aircraft at rest, the fire caused significant damage to the rear section of the aircraft but was quickly extinguished due to the heavy rain and quick response from rescue teams in the airport.

Rescue vehicles quickly arrived on the scene and suppressed the fire on and in the vicinity of the aeroplane, allowing rescue of the passengers and crew to progress in very difficult conditions. Two passengers rescued from the wreckage were certified dead on arrival at hospital and one passenger died five days later in hospital. A total of 219 people, including crewmembers, were admitted to hospital, of whom 50 were seriously injured and 153 sustained minor injuries. All 15 crew members survived.

== Investigation ==
The final report of the accident blamed it mainly on pilot error, specifically the inability to arrest the high rate of descent existing at 50 feet (15 m) altitude on the radar altimeter. The descent rate at touch down was 18–20 feet per second (5.5–6.1 m/s).

The flight data stored in the volatile memory of the aircraft's Quick Access Recorder (QAR) during the last 500 feet (150 m) of the approach could not be recovered due to the interruption of the power supply at impact. Probable wind variations and the loss of headwind component, together with the early retardation of thrust levers, led to a 20 knots (37 km/h; 23 mph) loss in indicated airspeed just prior to touchdown.

Due to the severe weather conditions forecast for Hong Kong, the flight crew had prepared to divert the flight to Taipei if the situation at Hong Kong was deemed unsuitable for landing. Extra fuel was carried for this possibility, resulting in a landing weight of 429,557 lb (194,844 kg), 99.897% of its maximum landing weight of 430,000 lb (200,000 kg). Based on the initial weather and wind check which was passed along to the crew from Hong Kong during the flight, they believed they could land there and decided against a diversion to Taipei. However, four earlier flights had carried out missed approaches at Hong Kong and five had diverted.

During the final approach, the plane descended along the Instrument Landing System (ILS) glideslope until the crew visually acquired the runway at about 700 feet (210 m). They disengaged the autopilot but left the autothrottle on. During the flare, the rate of descent was not arrested, the plane landed with the right wing slightly lower. The right landing gear touched down first, the right engine impacted the runway and the right wing was detached from the fuselage. Since the left wing was still attached, the lift from that wing rolled the fuselage onto its right side, and the plane came to rest inverted in the grass strip next to the runway. The spilled fuel caught fire.

Several suggestions were given to China Airlines concerning its training. However, China Airlines disputed the report's findings on the flight crews' actions, citing the weather conditions at the time of the accident and claimed that the aircraft flew into a microburst just before landing, causing it to crash.

== Media ==
The landing and crash of Flight 642 was recorded by nearby occupants in a car which also captured their reactions from the witnesses.

A photo showing a Mandarin Airlines MD-11 taxiing past the remains of Flight 642 was circulated.

The crash was mentioned in Episode 7 of the first Season Extreme Engineering, despite many details being incorrect in the episode such as the flight number being misnamed as Flight 233.

This disaster was also aired on RTHK's Elite Brigade II Episode 2 in 2012.

== See also ==
- Delta Air Lines Flight 191 – a Lockheed L-1011 TriStar that crashed on approach under similar weather conditions in 1985
- Martinair Flight 495 – a DC-10 that broke up after a hard landing under similar weather conditions in 1992
- Lufthansa Cargo Flight 8460 – an MD-11 that bounced and broke up on landing in 2010
- FedEx Express Flight 80 – an MD-11 that bounced and flipped on landing in 2009
- FedEx Express Flight 14 – an MD-11 that bounced and flipped on landing in 1997
