= Malaysia Airlines Flight 2133 =

Fatal aviation accident in 1995

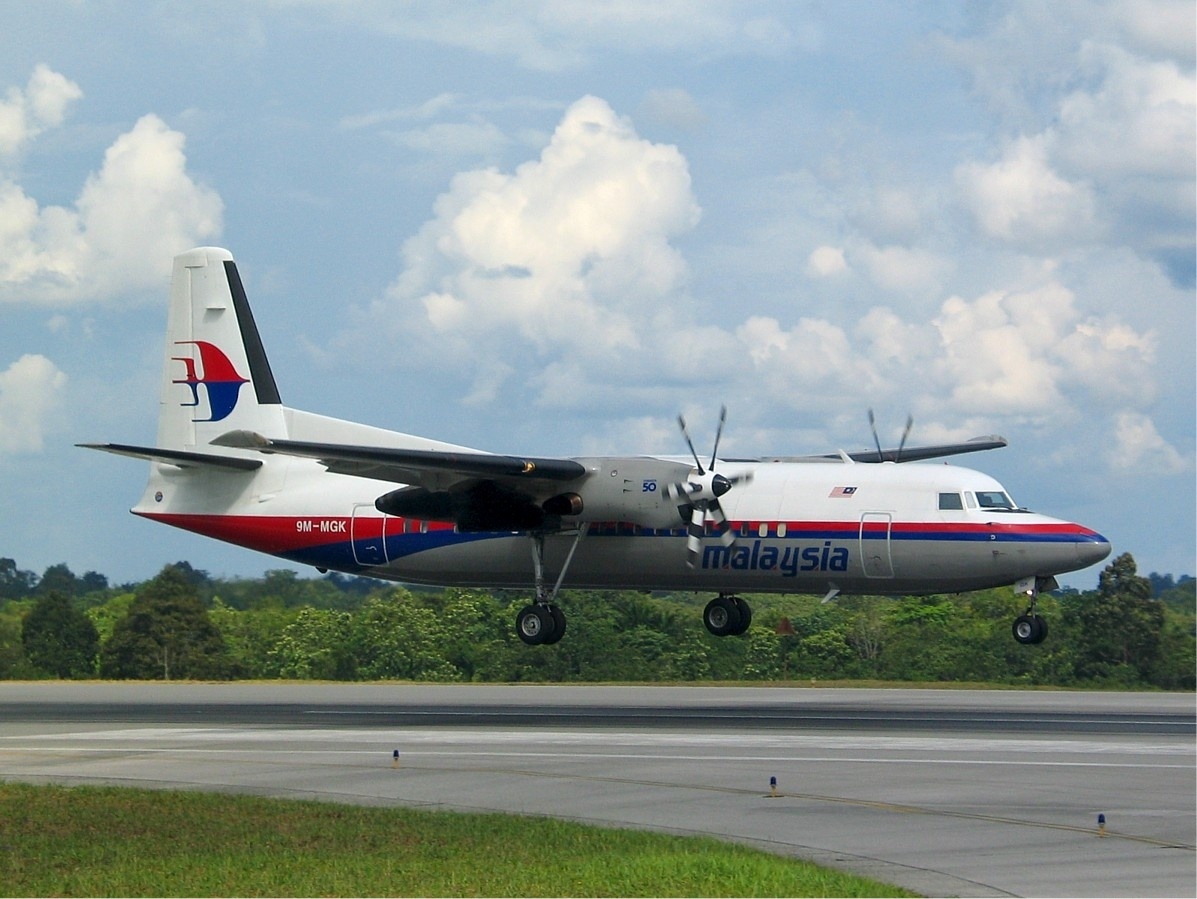
- A Malaysia Airlines Fokker 50 similar to the one which crashed.

Accident
- Date: 15 September 1995
- Summary: Runway overrun due to pilot error
- Site: Old Tawau Airport, Tawau, Sabah, Malaysia; 4°15′15.84″N 117°53′16.26″E

Aircraft
- Aircraft type: Fokker 50
- Operator: Malaysia Airlines
- IATA flight No.: MH2133
- ICAO flight No.: MAS2133
- Call sign: MALAYSIAN 2133
- Registration: 9M-MGH
- Flight origin: Kota Kinabalu International Airport, Kota Kinabalu, Sabah, Malaysia
- Destination: Tawau Airport, Tawau, Sabah, Malaysia
- Occupants: 53
- Passengers: 49
- Crew: 4
- Fatalities: 34
- Survivors: 19

Ground casualties
- Ground injuries: 10

Malaysia Airlines Flight 2133 (MH2133/MAS2133) was a scheduled domestic passenger flight from Kota Kinabalu to Tawau, operated by Malaysia's flag carrier Malaysia Airlines. On 15 September 1995, the Fokker 50 carrying 53 people overran the runway, continuing into a shanty town after the pilots failed to stop the aircraft while landing in Tawau, killing 32 of the 49 passengers and 2 of the 4 crew on board. This was the first hull loss of a Fokker 50.

The final report of the investigation, which was published in 1998, concluded that the crash was caused by the pilot's decision to land in Tawau, which was influenced by the airlines' strict policy of fuel-saving and punctuality, despite the fact that the available runway after touchdown was not sufficient for the aircraft to stop. Investigators issued several recommendations to both Malaysia Airlines and the Malaysian regulatory body, the latter being asked to make crew resource management training a compulsory course for airliners in Malaysia.

== Background ==
=== Aircraft ===
The aircraft was a five-year-old Fokker 50 with aircraft registration 9M-MGH. The aircraft was equipped with two Pratt & Whitney Canada engines and had accumulated a total of 17,483 flight cycles.

=== Flight crew ===
The captain of the flight was Wong Khang Lock (40). He had accumulated a total of 4,892 hours, of which 427 hours were on the Fokker F27. He held valid flight and medical certificates. The first officer of the flight was Su Tiong Hee (28). He had accumulated a total of 1,162 hours, of which 962 were on the Fokker F27. (Note: For reasons unknown, in the final report Fokker F27 was somehow written instead of Fokker F50 for the total flying hours on the type)

== Accident ==
Flight 2133 was a domestic passenger flight from Kota Kinabalu, the capital of Sabah, to Tawau, a major city located at the Malaysia-Indonesia border in East Malaysia. There were 49 passengers, two pilots, and two cabin crew aboard the aircraft. The scheduled flight time was one hour.

Flight 2133 had been delayed for 30 minutes from its scheduled take-off time due to the aircraft's late arrival in Kota Kinabalu. The aircraft finally took off from Kota Kinabalu International Airport at 12:19 local time with instrument flight rules. Weather at Tawau was reported as "surface wind calm, visibility more than 10km, rain north to north east, scattered 1600ft and scattered 2700ft, broken at 14000ft, temperature 30 degrees C and QNH 1009mb, runway 17." At the time, Tawau's runway was only 5600ft long. The flight was uneventful until its approach.

Upon reaching the airport, the aircraft was passing 3,500ft and was configured for landing. Despite this, the aircraft was still too fast and high for the approach. Nevertheless, the commander assured the co-pilot "Runway is long so no problem, eh [sic]." The co-pilot continued to advise the commander of excess speed, while the aircraft continued a descent of 3,000 ft/min at a pitch angle of -13 degrees. This flight attitude triggered the GPWS warnings, which were ignored.

At 13:05 (GMT+8), the aircraft touched down on the runway approximately 3,400ft from the threshold, bouncing and touching down again 4500ft down the runway. A second bounce occurred, with a final touchdown 4,800ft down the runway, leaving only 800ft of runway to stop. It then overran the runway and crossed the airport's grassy area before it crashed into the Sri Menanti shanty town, approximately 500 meters from the end of the runway.

The aircraft broke into two parts and the wings had snapped due to the impact, causing fuel to leak. A fire had ignited due to the aircraft's collision with multiple houses in the area. As the fire intensified, the passengers and crew on the aircraft tried to evacuate the burning aircraft. However, a massive explosion suddenly engulfed the entire aircraft, burning the remaining passengers and crews inside the aircraft. Houses nearby ignited, allowing the fire to spread to nearly the entire neighborhood. Residents in the area immediately fled for safety.

Tawau's fire fighting services immediately deployed 18 firefighters to the area. The rescue effort was hampered by the amount of onlookers at the crash site. Rescuers managed to douse the flames later that evening. A total of 34 dead bodies were found and 17 passengers, 2 crew members and 10 residents had to be treated for wounds. A total of 40 houses were damaged in the crash.

Prime Minister Mahathir Mohamad and Deputy Prime Minister Anwar Ibrahim expressed their deepest condolences to the next-of-kin of the passengers and crew of the Malaysia Airlines' Fokker 50.

== Investigation ==
Malaysian authorities set up a team of six investigators from the Department of Civil Aviation to investigate the crash. Representatives from Malaysia Airlines, Netherlands (representing Fokker), Canada (representing Pratt and Whitney Canada), and the United States (representing the Federal Aviation Administration) were also invited to assist in the investigation. The flight recorders were processed at the United Kingdom's Air Accidents Investigation Branch (AAIB) facility in Farnborough.

=== Sequence of flight ===
During Flight 2133's descent into Tawau, the controller put the aircraft as number 2 to land at the airport, even though the aircraft's position was ahead of the number 1 aircraft (Transmile Flight 809), which was at a lower altitude. The number 3 aircraft was a Malaysia Airlines Boeing 737 located right behind Flight 2133 and the number 1 aircraft. This traffic situation would hold the key to the crash of Flight 2133 as the traffic caused Flight 2133's inability to obtain descent clearance to below 10,500ft.

The captain and the first officer discussed the situation and also attempted to obtain descent clearance from 17,000ft to 10,500ft. This request was denied and the captain had to negotiate with the flight crew in the number 1 aircraft so that Flight 2133 could become the number 1 aircraft instead. Their request was later granted by the controller. Because the pilots of Flight 2133 initiated the descent to 10,500ft much closer to Tawau than it should be, the aircraft required a higher descent rate than normal. Flight 2133 then started its descent from 10,500ft to 7,000ft at 12:59 local time. The flight was cleared to descend to 7,000ft and later was cleared for a visual approach with an altitude below 7,000ft. The first officer warned the captain on the high speed of the aircraft and the high descent rate. Later, the captain stated that instead of slowing down, he would maintain the high speed. The aircraft at the time was still at a higher altitude than it should be for an approach at that distance and the speed was also well above normal.

Noticing the high speed of the aircraft, the first officer asked the captain to slow down. The auto-pilot was disengaged and the flight crew performed the pre-landing checklist. The captain stated to the first officer that "the approach would be okay as long as the speed of the aircraft was not more than 160 knots." A minute later, the captain reassured the first officer that there would be no problem for Flight 2133 to land in Tawau since the runway was long enough. The first officer again warned the captain to check the speed.

Despite the first officer's warnings, the captain declined to reduce speed, instead remarking that a landing was possible as long as the runway length was enough and that the speed of the aircraft was still below 160 knots.

Due to the high descent rate and a nose down attitude with a pitch angle of -3 degree, the GPWS warning then sounded. Malaysia Airlines' flight operations manual states that any activation of GPWS necessitates that the flight crew make a go-around. Despite this, the captain made the decision to land, and Flight 2133 touched down at three quarters of the runway's total length. The flight crew's attempts to slow down were rendered impossible due to the high speed of the aircraft and the insufficient remaining runway length.

=== Captain's frustration ===
The captain's insistence to land in Tawau despite the speed and altitude of the aircraft could be explained by his prior stressful encounters with his managers and workers in Malaysia Airlines. The captain claimed to his colleagues that someone in the company was "out to get him".

He had been involved in an incident on 19 May 1995 at Bintulu Airport. In response to the incident, the fleet manager of Malaysia Airlines' Fokker in Kuching accused the captain of displaying poor airmanship and being uncooperative with air traffic controller despite the co-pilot’s supporting statements for the captain in the 19 May event. The captain expressed his disappointment that not only did the fleet manager not support him in the incident, but that the manager also agreed to carry out his next line check.

A few months after the incident, in September 1995, the captain's flight logs were reviewed by airline management. He felt that they didn't allow him to explain his decisions and that the fleet manager was biased against him. He expressed fear of the fleet manager in Kuching as he opined that the manager's decision to give him the line check was a way to set up the captain to be fired from the company. Nevertheless, he passed the flight check.

Their last encounter was on 15 September 1995, the day of the accident. Prior to the accident flight, the captain had been counseled by the fleet manager on company policy regarding cost cutting. The manager discussed avoiding circling airports and instead using straight-in approaches, avoiding instrument approaches, and even delaying top-of-descent wherever possible. The captain was told to strictly adhere to the company's cost-cutting and fuel-saving policies.

Flight 2133 had taken off 30 minutes late due to its late arrival in Kota Kinabalu. This negatively impacted the flight crew's attempts to obtain descent clearance in Tawau. The cockpit voice recorder managed to capture the Captain's concerns about the delay. At one time he was heard expressing his concern about the possibility of being called up again by his manager. Once he was granted the number 1 landing position, the captain committed to landing so as not to disrupt the landing traffic sequence.

=== Other contributing factors ===
The Captain had landed on multiple "very short airstrips" in the jungles of Malaysian Borneo and had operated short take off and landing (STOL) aircraft. A significant portion of his flight hours had involved steep approaches, which may have contributed to his overconfidence.

Another finding was that a visual illusion might have also played a role in the crash. A visual approach to Tawau could result in an illusion that would cause the flight crew to feel that they were lower than the actual glideslope angle.

=== Conclusion ===
The report was published on 20 May 1998, nearly three years after the crash. Malaysian authorities cited the following:

The most probable cause of the accident was due to the commander's insistence to continue with an approach despite the fact that the runway available after touchdown was insufficient for the aircraft to stop. The perception regarding economic consideration which put pressure on him to save fuel and adhere to schedules was a contributing factor.

In response to the negative image that Malaysia Airlines had received in light of the investigation, the company tried to "clarify issues and narrow the gap between the management and the flight crew". Investigators issued a recommendation to Malaysia Airlines "to overcome flight crew hesitancy or resistance to change" when instilling flying discipline in order to meet corporate and business goals.

Even though the report blamed the captain's action as the cause of the crash, it also highlighted the first officer's lack of initiative to correct the situation. As such, investigators requested Malaysian regulatory body to mandate every airliner in Malaysia to include crew resource management as compulsory training for flight crew. Malaysia Airlines was asked to implement this recommendation immediately.

== See also ==
- Garuda Indonesia Flight 200, similar incident which was caused by the captain's insistence on landing despite the high speed condition of the aircraft
- China Southern Airlines Flight 3456
- China Airlines Flight 676
