= Lufthansa Cargo Flight 8460 =

2010 aviation accident

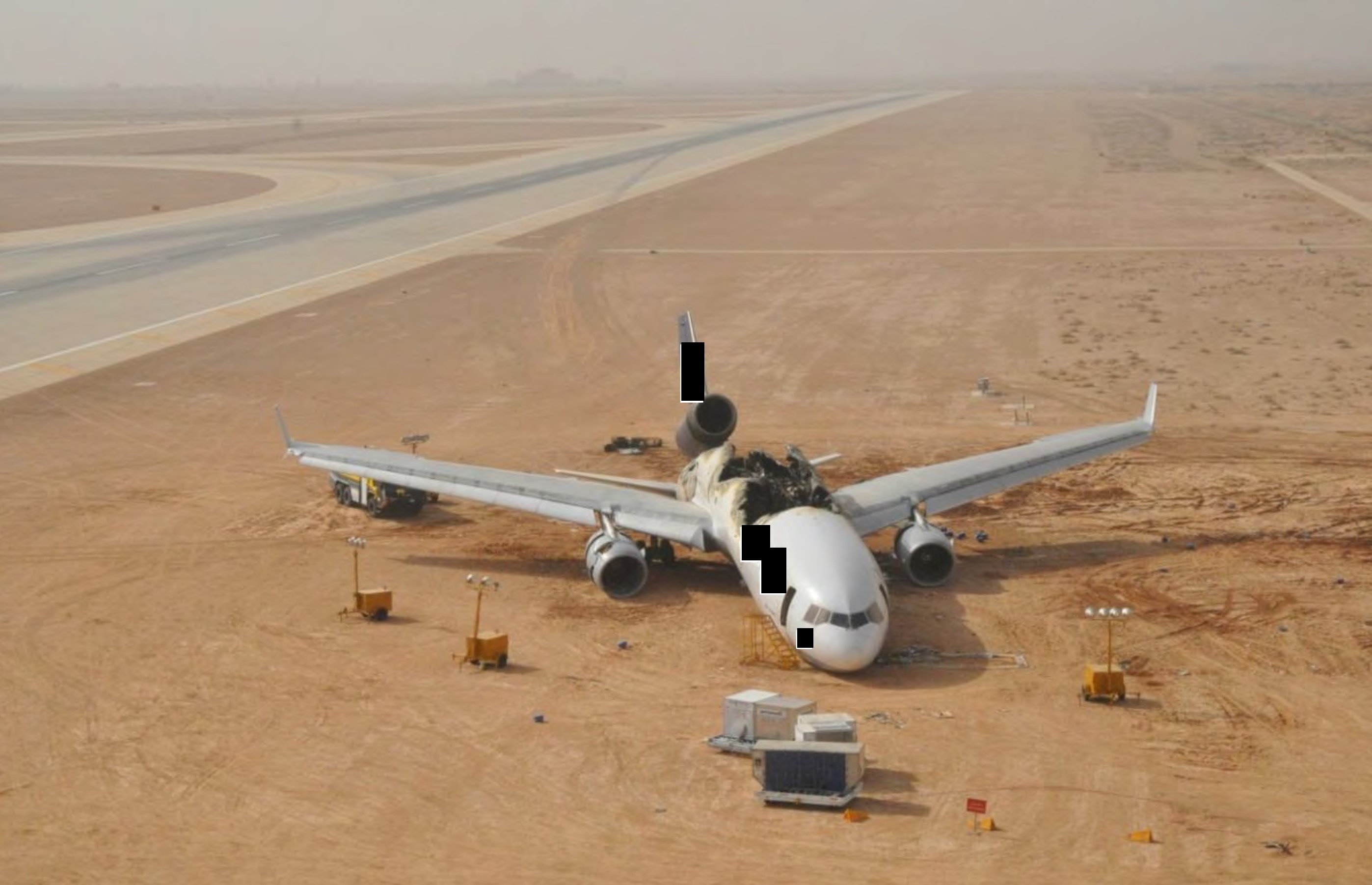
- Wreckage of the aircraft (Note: Markings relating to the name of the operator are blacked out in accordance with policy at the German Federal Bureau of Aircraft Accident Investigation, the agency that released the report, dictating that anonymity of persons involved in the accident must be maintained when releasing reports of foreign investigations.)

Accident
- Date: 27 July 2010
- Summary: Crashed on landing due to hard touchdown
- Site: King Khalid International Airport, Riyadh, Saudi Arabia; 24.9578°N 46.8656°E

Aircraft
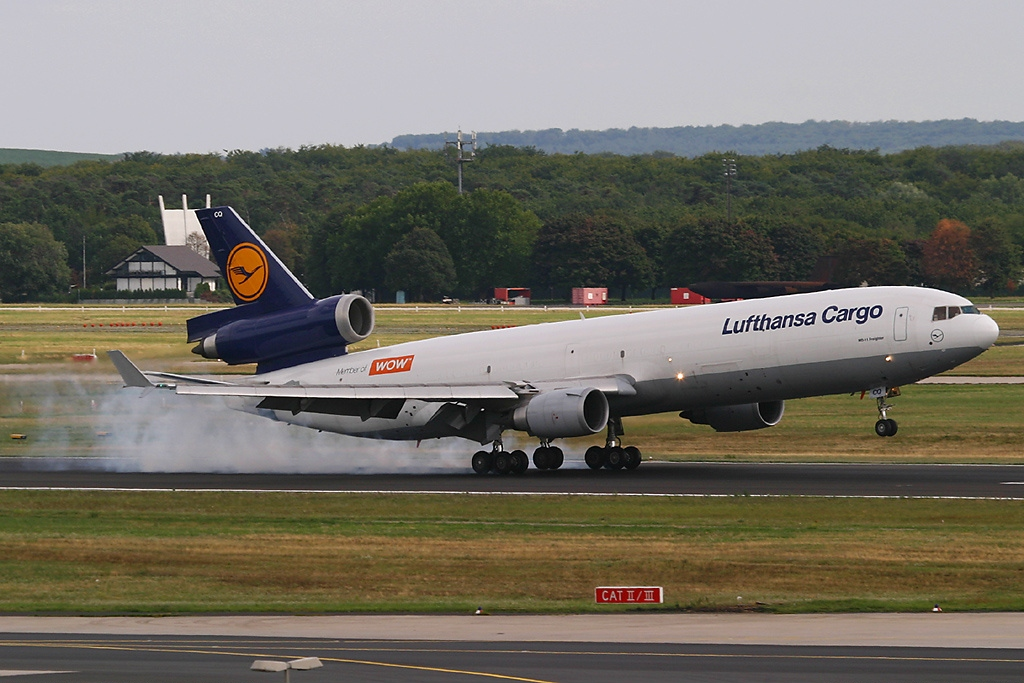
- D-ALCQ, the aircraft involved, photographed in August 2005
- Aircraft type: McDonnell Douglas MD-11F
- Operator: Lufthansa Cargo
- IATA flight No.: LH8460
- ICAO flight No.: GEC8460
- Call sign: LUFTHANSA CARGO 8460
- Registration: D-ALCQ
- Flight origin: Frankfurt International Airport, Frankfurt, Germany
- 1st stopover: King Khalid International Airport, Riyadh, Saudi Arabia
- 2nd stopover: Sharjah Airport, Sharjah, United Arab Emirates
- Destination: Hong Kong International Airport, Hong Kong
- Occupants: 2
- Crew: 2
- Fatalities: 0
- Injuries: 2
- Survivors: 2

Lufthansa Cargo Flight 8460 was an international cargo flight operated by a McDonnell Douglas MD-11 which crashed upon landing in Riyadh, Saudi Arabia on 27 July 2010. Both crew members, the only people on board, were injured but survived.

== Accident ==
Flight 8460 was an international scheduled cargo flight from Frankfurt, Germany, to Hong Kong via Riyadh, Saudi Arabia, and Sharjah, United Arab Emirates. The flight from Frankfurt to Riyadh was uneventful, and weather conditions at Riyadh were good, with sufficient visibility.

On arrival at King Khalid International Airport in Riyadh, the plane landed heavily, bounced repeatedly, eventually breaking up and veering off the runway. Both the 39-year-old Captain and 29-year-old First Officer were able to evacuate the plane using the emergency slide, but were injured. After the crash, a fire consumed the midsection of the aircraft before it was brought under control by the airport emergency services.

== Aircraft ==
The aircraft involved in the accident was a McDonnell Douglas MD-11 registered as D-ALCQ, MSN 48431, line number 534. The aircraft was delivered to Alitalia in 1993 as I-DUPB and was later converted to a cargo aircraft in 2004. At the time of the accident, D-ALCQ had completed 10,073 cycles and accumulated 73,247 airframe hours. It was also equipped with three General Electric CF6-80C2D1F engines.

== Investigation ==
The General Authority of Civil Aviation opened an investigation into the accident. The final report found that the cause of the accident was that the airplane touched down too hard, which caused it to bounce on the runway. The crew did not recognize the bounce and reacted in a way that made the plane bounce even harder. The third and final touchdown was so hard that it caused the aft fuselage to rupture.

Before this accident, there were 29 other bounced or severe hard landings with MD-11 aircraft that caused substantial damage. A similar accident had occurred on FedEx Express Flight 80 in the previous year, where both crew members were killed in a bounced landing.

It was known that flight crews found MD-11 bounced landings difficult to detect. The final report made several recommendations to improve training, procedures and flight instruments to help crews to deal with bounced landings.

== See also ==
- FedEx Express Flight 80 – an MD-11 that bounced and flipped on landing in 2009
- China Airlines Flight 642 – an MD-11 that landed hard in a typhoon and flipped in 1999
- FedEx Express Flight 14 – an MD-11 that bounced and flipped on landing in 1997
- List of accidents and incidents involving commercial aircraft
