= Ministry of Public Works and Transport (Laos) =

Government ministry of Laos

- ກະຊວງໂຍທາທິການ ແລະຂົນສົ່ງ

Ministry overview
- Formed: November 2007 (as MPWT) (Note: The ministry was transformed from the Ministry of Communication, Transport, Post and Construction (MCTPC) in November 2007.)
- Preceding Ministry: Ministry of Communication, Transport, Post and Construction (MCTPC)
- Jurisdiction: Government of Laos
- Headquarters: Lanxang Avenue, Vientiane, Laos
- Minister responsible: Leklay Sivilay, Minister of Public Works and Transport
- Child Ministry: Department of Civil Aviation
- Website: www.mpwt.gov.la

The Ministry of Public Works and Transport (MPWT or PWT, Lao: ກະຊວງໂຍທາທິການ ແລະຂົນສົ່ງ) is a government ministry of Laos, with its head office on Lanxang Avenue in Vientiane. The ministry is responsible for managing and developing the country's transport infrastructure, including roads, waterways, aviation, railways, housing, urban planning, and water supply.

== History ==
The ministry was established in its current form in November 2007, when it was transformed from the Ministry of Communication, Transport, Post and Construction (MCTPC). The reorganization was part of a broader administrative restructuring that separated the postal and telecommunications functions from the transport and public works portfolios.

== Leadership ==
The current Minister of Public Works and Transport is Leklay Sivilay, who is also a member of the Lao People's Revolutionary Party Central Committee. He has served in the role since at least early 2026 and has been actively involved in regional transport cooperation, including bilateral talks with Vietnam and inspections of key infrastructure links.

== Agencies ==
- Department of Civil Aviation
