= FedEx Express Flight 80 =

2009 aircraft accident in Japan

Coordinates: 35°45′35″N 140°22′40″E

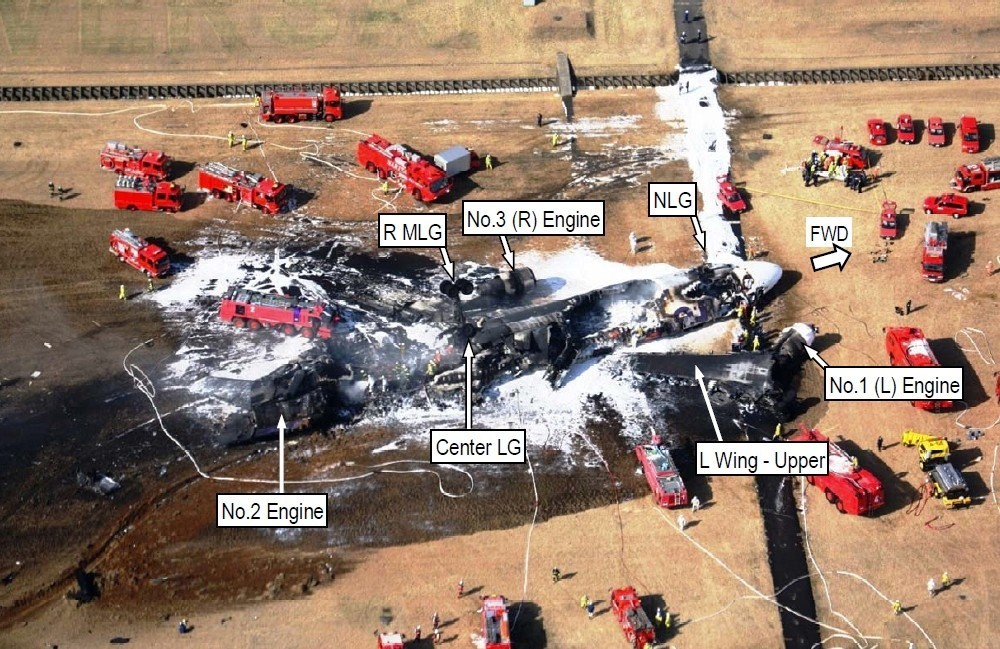
- Aerial view of the aircraft wreckage

Accident
- Date: 23 March 2009
- Summary: Structural failure and collision with terrain following a bounced landing exacerbated by excessive pilot input
- Site: Narita International Airport, Narita, Japan

Aircraft
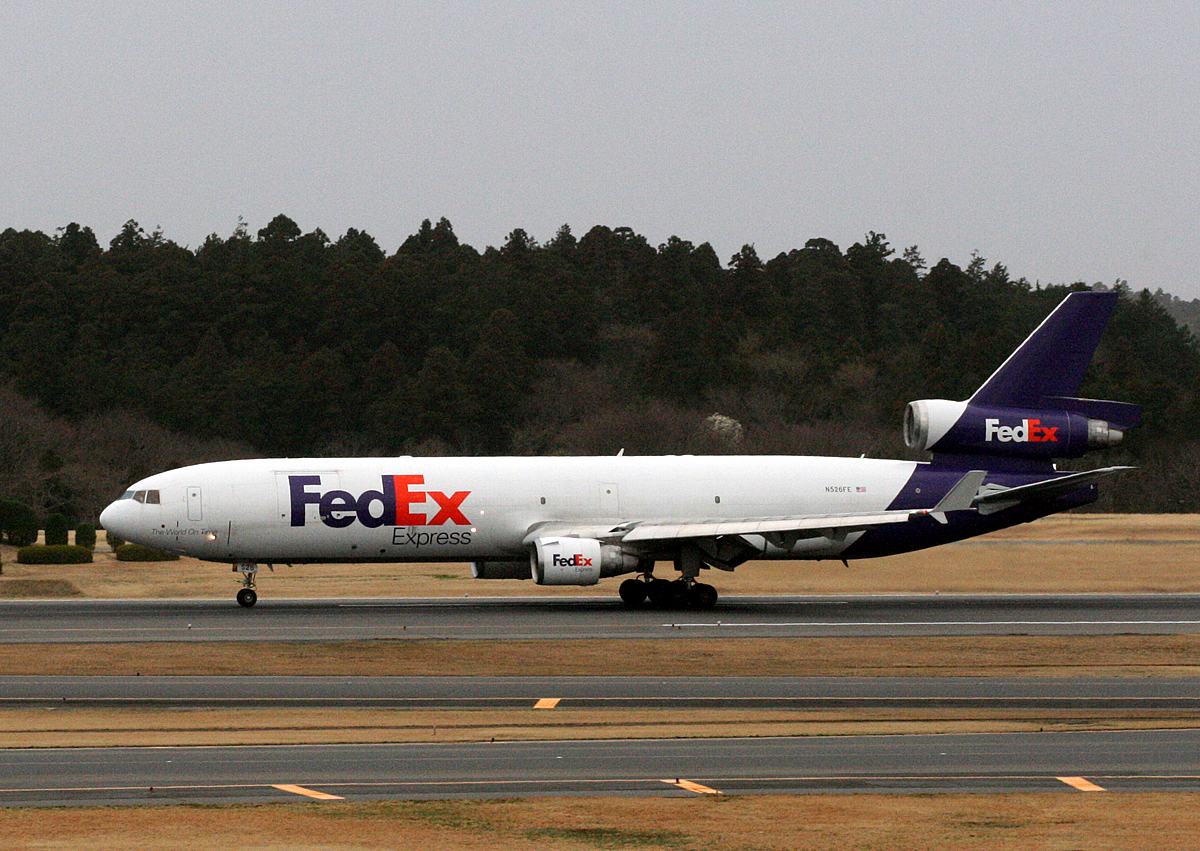
- N526FE, the aircraft involved, seen two days before the accident
- Aircraft type: McDonnell Douglas MD-11F
- Operator: FedEx Express
- IATA flight No.: FX80
- ICAO flight No.: FDX80
- Call sign: FEDEX 80
- Registration: N526FE
- Flight origin: Guangzhou Baiyun International Airport, Guangzhou, China
- Destination: Narita International Airport, Narita, Japan
- Occupants: 2
- Crew: 2
- Fatalities: 2
- Survivors: 0

FedEx Express Flight 80 was a scheduled cargo flight from Guangzhou Baiyun International Airport, China, to Narita International Airport, Japan, operated by FedEx Express. At 06:48 JST (UTC+09:00) on 23 March 2009, the McDonnell Douglas MD-11 registered N526FE operating the flight crashed while attempting a landing on Runway 34L in gusty and highly variable weather conditions, including winds in excess of 40 knots (74 km/h). The aircraft became destabilized after the fatigued co-pilot's delayed start of the landing flare, subsequently exacerbated by his excessively large, nose-down inputs causing abrupt changes in the plane's pitch, increasing the speed and severity of repeated touchdowns during the bounced landing. This resulted in a structural failure of the landing gear and airframe, with the left wing detaching and power of the jet on the right wing thus causing the plane to roll. The plane came to a stop off of the runway, with the plane inverted and on fire. The captain and first officer, who were the only occupants, survived the initial crash. The airport's rescue crew got the pilots out of the aircraft and tried getting them to a hospital, but the crew succumbed to their injuries before they could receive medical attention.

== Accident ==
The flight took off from Guangzhou at 02:06 CST (UTC+8:00) and was expected to arrive at Narita at 06:53 JST (UTC+9:00), a planned flight time of just under four hours. At 06:43:57, air traffic control informed the flight crew that a Boeing 747 had landed at 06:41 and reported wind shear of ±15 knots (28 km/h) below 2000 ft. Surface winds at the time of the accident were reported from 320° at 26 knots (30 mph; 48 km/h) gusting to 40 knots (46 mph; 74 km/h). After making a hard landing on runway 34L, the plane bounced three times, coming back down on its nose gear first (a condition called "porpoising") resulting in the loss of directional and altitudinal control. The left wing struck the ground as the left main gear collapsed, causing the aircraft to veer to the left, burst into flames and invert as the airframe broke up, and came to rest upside down in the grass to the left of the runway. It took firefighters about two hours to extinguish the blaze, which completely destroyed the aircraft and its contents.

=== Fatalities ===
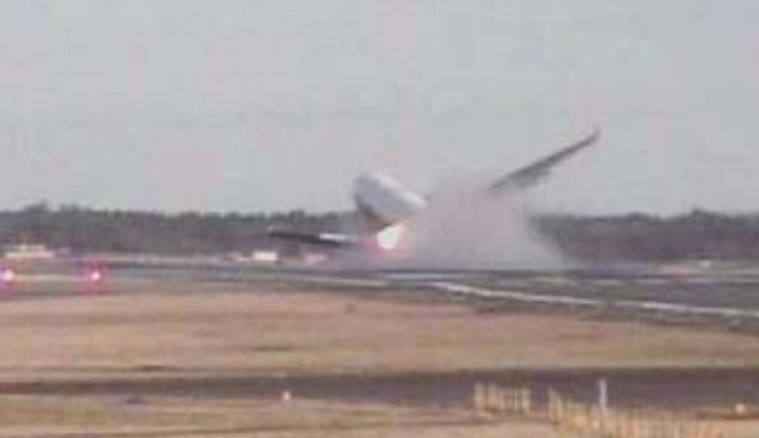
A still frame of Flight 80 when the landing gear collapsed and the airplane was flipping over

The only people on board the aircraft were 54-year-old Captain Kevin Kyle Mosley of Hillsboro, Oregon, and 49-year-old First Officer Anthony Stephen Pino of San Antonio, Texas. Both pilots were taken to the Japanese Red Cross Narita Hospital (成田赤十字病院 Narita Seki Jūji Byōin) where they were pronounced dead. Captain Mosley, a retired United States Marine Corps (USMC) fighter pilot, had been with FedEx Express since July 1, 1996, and had accumulated more than 12,800 total career flight hours, including 3,648 hours on the MD-11. First Officer Pino, a former C-5 Galaxy pilot in the United States Air Force (1981–2004), joined FedEx Express in 2006 and had accumulated more than 6,300 total career flight hours, 879 of them on the MD-11. No one on the ground was injured.

=== Runway closure ===
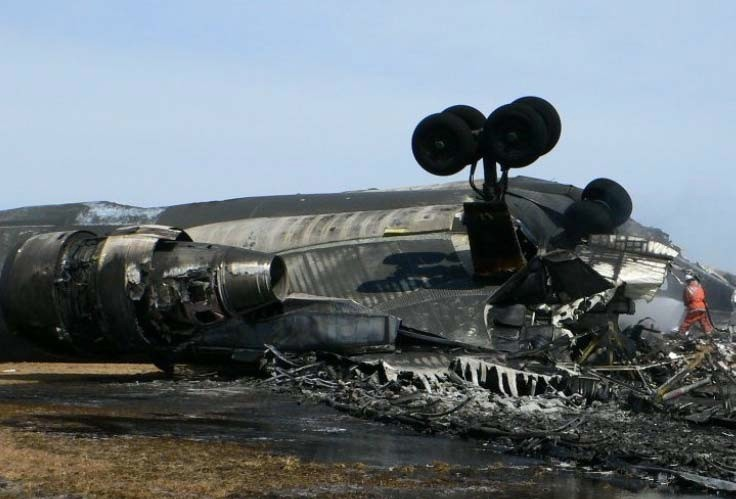
The aftermath of Flight 80

Runway 16R/34L (length 13,125 feet (4,000 m)) was closed for many hours after the accident, leaving the shorter 16L/34R as the only available active runway. As a result, many flights operated by larger aircraft had to be cancelled or diverted to other airports such as nearby Haneda Airport, as 16L/34R is too short (length 7,150 feet (2,180 m)) for some types to land safely, and other infrastructure limitations further prevented the operation of larger commercial aircraft.

== Aircraft ==
The aircraft was built in 1994 as an MD-11 passenger airliner. It was acquired temporarily by the National Aeronautics and Space Administration (NASA) to use as the test bed for their Propulsion-Controlled Aircraft system (PCA) in 1995. Later it was owned and operated by Delta Air Lines from 1996 to 2004 under the FAA registration N813DE in such configuration. The trijet was sold to FedEx in October 2004 when Delta retired its MD-11 fleet in favor of switching to more-efficient twin-engine Boeing 767s and Boeing 777s on its long-haul routes. Following its acquisition by FedEx, the plane was stored at Phoenix Goodyear Airport in Goodyear, Arizona pending its conversion there to an MD-11F by Dimension Aviation, Inc., Boeing's Douglas Products Division airframe conversion contractor located at that field. The aircraft entered service with FedEx in its all-cargo configuration in late 2006 as N526FE. It was powered by three Pratt & Whitney PW4462 engines.

== Cause ==
The Japan Transport Safety Board (JTSB) dispatched six investigators to the airport. The United States' National Transportation Safety Board (NTSB) sent a team to Japan to assist with the investigation. The crash was FedEx's second fatal accident involving a jet aircraft, following the loss of a FedEx owned B747-249F that crashed February 18, 1989, near Kuala Lumpur, while still painted in the Flying Tigers livery after the acquisition of the Flying Tiger Line by FedEx Express in December 1988. This was the first fatal accident at Narita Airport.

The accident was attributed by the JTSB to a series of "porpoising oscillations" that developed during touchdown, following a high sink rate during the final approach. The first officer executed a late flare, in which sink rate was not suppressed until the plane was nearly on the runway, but which also would minimize "float" that might carry the plane further down the runway and reduce its safe stopping distance, or carry it off the centerline in the existing crosswinds. This high touchdown sink rate, coupled with large nose-up inputs, caused the first bounce. A large nose-down input was applied, causing a touchdown on the nose gear. This deviates from approved procedures for the MD-11 during a bounce, which specifies the pilot is to hold a pitch angle of 7.5 deg and use thrust to adjust the descent rate. The plane bounced off this second touchdown, pitching upward. The large control inputs by the first officer resulted in a hard touchdown on the main landing gear. This final touchdown was hard enough (1,200 ft/min (370 m/min)) to cause the left wing to fail as the left main landing gear transferred force up into the wing, exceeding its design limit. The JTSB report suggested the fire might have been averted if the landing gear fuse pin had failed as designed, but that much of the touchdown force was horizontal to the pin rather than vertical, keeping it intact. The report also cited the crew's use of autothrottle during landing despite gusty wind conditions.

As a result of this accident the Japan Transport Safety Board published its final report on April 26, 2013, in which it made a number of new safety recommendations including that "in order to reduce the occurrence of MD-11 series airplanes' severe hard landing and bounce in which an overload is transferred to the MLGs and their supporting structure, the Boeing Company should improve the controllability and maneuver characteristics by improving the LSAS (Longitudinal Stability Augmentation System) functions, reducing the AGS (Auto Ground Spoilers) deployment delay time and other possible means. Possible improvement on LSAS functions may include: a function to limit large nose-down elevator input during touchdown phase, which is a common phenomenon in severe hard landing cases accompanied by structural destruction for MD-11; and a function to assist bounce recovery and go-around in case of bounce. In order to help pilots to conduct recovery operation from large bounces and judge the necessity of go-around, studies should be made to install a visual display and an aural warning system which show gear touchdown status on MD-11 series airplanes."

The investigation into the two pilots' performance during Flight 80 found that both exhibited signs of lack of sleep and fatigue, and the first officer was heard on the cockpit voice recorder talking about how he had not slept very much prior to operating the flight. A look at both pilots' activity in the days leading up to the flight found that, based on accounts from hotel staff, credit card transactions, and other signs of activity, neither pilot could have had more than four hours of consecutive sleep in the twenty-four hours leading up to the crash.

Additionally, the pilot flying, First Officer Anthony Pino, usually served as a relief pilot, taking control in the middle of long-haul flights. He therefore had little experience in landing the MD-11, and performed landings very infrequently.

== FedEx Express Flight 14 ==
On July 31, 1997, another FedEx MD-11F (N611FE), operating as FedEx Express Flight 14, was written off after a similar destabilized landing accident at Newark International Airport. After a flight from Anchorage, Alaska, that aircraft crashed at the airport just before midnight when it bounced twice after a hard touchdown on runway 22R, resulting in the right main landing gear collapsing. Like Flight 80, Flight 14 also caught fire as the airframe broke up, flipped over, and came to rest inverted off the runway. The captain, first officer, and three passengers on board were able to escape from the burning aircraft with only minor injuries.

== In popular media ==
The crash of both FedEx Express Flights 80 and 14 were covered in 2015 in "The Final Push", a Season 14 episode of the internationally syndicated Canadian TV documentary series Mayday.

== See also ==
- China Airlines Flight 642 – an MD-11 that crashed while landing during strong winds in 1999
- Lufthansa Cargo Flight 8460 – an MD-11 that bounced and broke up on landing in 2010
- List of accidents and incidents involving commercial aircraft
