= Tropical Storm Sam (1999) =

Pacific severe tropical storm in 1999

Severe Tropical Storm Sam (Luding)
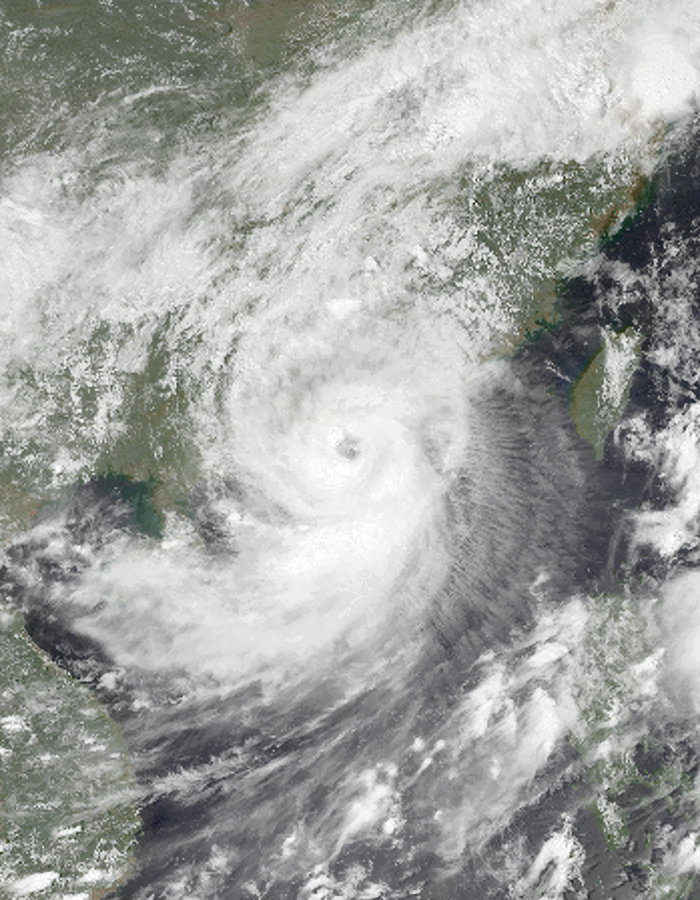
- Sam at peak intensity over China on August 22

Meteorological history
- Formed: August 17, 1999
- Extratropical: August 22, 1999
- Dissipated: August 27, 1999

Severe tropical storm
- 10-minute sustained (JMA)
- Highest winds: 100 km/h (65 mph)
- Lowest pressure: 980 hPa (mbar); 28.94 inHg

Category 1-equivalent tropical cyclone
- 1-minute sustained (SSHWS/JTWC)
- Highest winds: 140 km/h (85 mph)

Overall effects
- Fatalities: 28 total
- Damage: $35 million (1999 USD)
- Areas affected: Philippines, South China
- Part of the 1999 Pacific typhoon season

Severe Tropical Storm Sam, also known in the Philippines as Tropical Storm Luding, was a relatively strong storm that formed in August 1999. It brought severe impacts to the Philippines and southeastern China, causing 20 deaths.

== Meteorological history ==
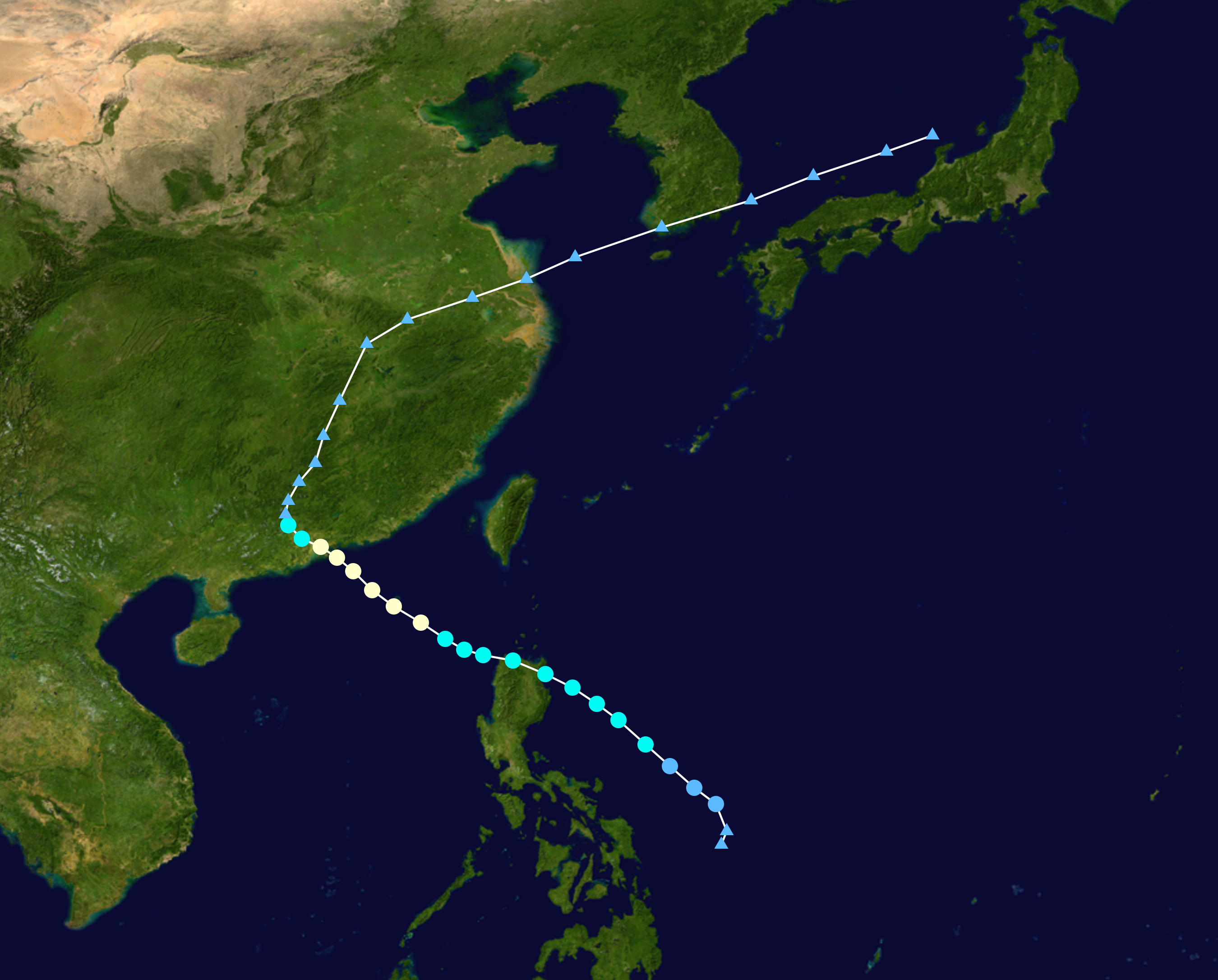
Map plotting the storm's track and intensity, according to the Saffir–Simpson scale Map key Saffir–Simpson scale Tropical depression (≤38 mph, ≤62 km/h) Tropical storm (39–73 mph, 63–118 km/h) Category 1 (74–95 mph, 119–153 km/h) Category 2 (96–110 mph, 154–177 km/h) Category 3 (111–129 mph, 178–208 km/h) Category 4 (130–156 mph, 209–251 km/h) Category 5 (≥157 mph, ≥252 km/h) Unknown Storm type Tropical cyclone Subtropical cyclone Extratropical cyclone, remnant low, tropical disturbance, or monsoon depression

On August 17, an area of circulation within the monsoon trough located in the Philippine Sea became more organized and the JTWC issued a TCFA. The developing cyclone slowly moved to the northwest, becoming Tropical Depression 16W nine hours after the TCFA was first issued. As the cyclone continued to intensify, it was named Sam on August 19. Around this time, the subtropical ridge to Sam's north shifted its track in a westwards direction towards Luzon. The storm passed over the north of the island on August 20 and entered the South China Sea, reaching typhoon strength the next day. Sam gradually intensified further as it approached the Chinese coast and it made landfall about 19 km (12 mi) to the northeast of Hong Kong at its peak with 140 km/h (85 mph) winds on August 22. Sam continued to move to the northwest over China dissipating about 24 hours later. PAGASA named the developing storm Luding shortly before the JTWC began to issue advisories.

== Impact ==
Typhoon Sam was responsible for seven deaths in the Philippines. In addition, flooding from its rainfall displaced over 4000 people, and many major roads were closed due to landslides near Baguio. Sam became the wettest tropical cyclone to affect Hong Kong since records began in 1884, dropping over 616 mm (24.2 inches) of rain, exceeding the previous record set in 1926. Peak sustained winds of 96 km/h (60 mph) were recorded on Waglan Island as the typhoon passed over the territory. The heavy rain led to many instances of flooding and over 150 landslides throughout Hong Kong, killing 1 person and forcing the evacuation of about 1,000. A total of 328 people were injured in various incidents relating to the storm, and total losses in Hong Kong totaled to approximately $17 million.

=== China Airlines Flight 642 crash ===
In addition to the direct casualties from the storm, China Airlines Flight 642, using a McDonnell Douglas MD-11 aircraft, crashed while attempting to land at Hong Kong International Airport, killing three on board and injuring 219. At the time of the crash wind gusts in excess of 65 km/h (40 mph) were recorded at the airport. After moving into China, Sam killed at least 17 and injured 100 people in Guangdong. Direct economic losses in the province were about $18 million.

== See also ==
- China Airlines Flight 642 – which crashed partly due to high winds produced by the storm
