= Don Kho =

Island village in Lao

Coordinates: 15°11′N 105°43′E

Don Kho as seen from exposed rocks in the Mekong

Don Kho is an island village in Laos, located in Champasak Province. It sits in the main stream of the Mekong River upstream (northwest) of Pakse

== General information ==
Villagers participate in traditional Lao dance

Don Kho is a small island in the Mekong River with a population of roughly 450 people. It is located several kilometres upstream from the Southern Lao city of Pakse. The villagers here depend very largely on fishing as a source of livelihood. Much of the fish is sold for cash income and used to buy other products and produce. The island is also covered in idyllic rice paddies which provide another source of food for the locals. There has been some tension on the island recently with the local district setting up a "no fishing" exclusion zone in part of the waterways, potentially impacting upon livelihoods.

Lao Airlines Flight 301 crashed near Don Kho on 16 October 2013.

== Tourist Industry ==
There is a very small silk-weaving industry on the island, which is regarded highly for the quality of silk and the patterns produced. The island does not have electricity or running water, but tourists are welcome to visit during the day. Currently very few tourists visit this island (at times there are none for months on end) as the resources and attractions are limited. To get there one would need to pay a local boat operator some kip to take you across to the island. The islanders hope, in time, to develop a more substantial tourism industry on the island, but currently do not have the means to do so.

Old temple on Don Kho, built by the French

The island does now have electricity .

== Other features ==
The island features a small school and surprisingly dramatic temple which was originally built by the French, now used by the Buddhist monks on the island. The temple complex also features a large bell tower which is used by the monks to signal meal times for those on the island. Now there is electricity on the Island {220 volts}
