= Department of Civil Aviation (Laos) =

Civil aviation authority of Laos

The Department of Civil Aviation of Lao PDR is the civil aviation authority of Laos. The agency, a division of the Ministry of Public Works and Transport, has its headquarters on the property of the Wattay International Airport in Sikhodtabong District, Vientiane.

== Notes ==
- Overflight of Laos Airspace: Essential Regulations and Procedures
