= China Southern Airlines Flight 3456 =

1997 aviation accident in China

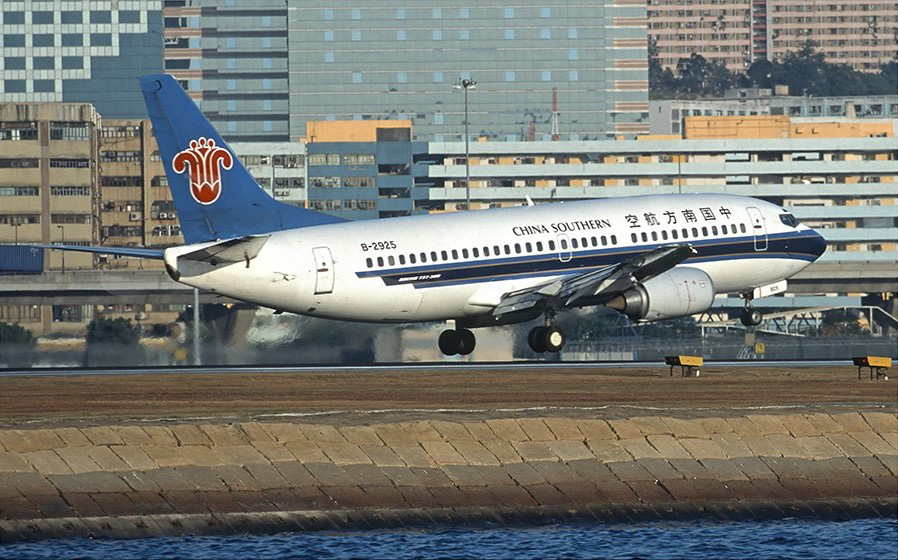
- B-2925, the aircraft involved in the accident, pictured in 1996

Accident
- Date: 8 May 1997
- Summary: Pilot error aggravated by severe weather
- Site: Shenzhen Huangtian Airport, Shenzhen, Guangdong, China; 22.6402°N 113.8109°E

Aircraft
- Aircraft type: Boeing 737-31B
- Operator: China Southern Airlines
- IATA flight No.: CSN3456
- ICAO flight No.: CZ3456
- Call sign: CHINA SOUTHERN 3456
- Registration: B-2925
- Flight origin: Chongqing Jiangbei International Airport
- Destination: Shenzhen Huangtian Airport
- Occupants: 74
- Passengers: 65
- Crew: 9
- Fatalities: 35
- Injuries: 9
- Survivors: 39

China Southern Airlines Flight 3456 was a scheduled domestic passenger flight from Chongqing Jiangbei International Airport to Shenzhen Huangtian Airport (now Shenzhen Bao'an International Airport). On 8 May 1997, the Boeing 737-300 performing this route crashed during the second attempt to land in a thunderstorm.

== Background ==
=== Aircraft ===
The aircraft was a Boeing 737-31B registered as B-2925 and with serial number 27288. It had recorded over 8,500 hours before the crash. The aircraft was powered by 2 CFM International CFM56-3C1 turbofan engines.

=== Flight crew ===
The captain in command was 45-year-old Lin Yougui (Chinese: 林友贵), he had logged more than 12,700 hours of total flying time, including 9,100 hours as Radio Operator and 3,600 hours as a pilot. The first officer was 36-year-old Kong Dexin (孔德新), he had logged over 15,500 hours of total flying time, of which 11,200 hours as flight engineer and 4,300 hours as a pilot.

=== Weather ===
The weather reported by Shenzhen Airport from 17:00 of 8 May to 02:00 of 9 May was: "170 degrees wind at 7 m/s (14 kn; 25 km/h; 16 mph) with rain, visibility 6,000 metres (20,000 ft), overcast at 1,500 metres (4,900 ft), variable winds at 15 metres per second (29 kn; 54 km/h; 34 mph), thunderstorm may appear."

At 18:00, on 8 May, a severe weather warning was issued: "report to airports, air traffic controls and airline companies: Thunderstorm with strong winds will appear, all departments including the crew who will be taking off should be notified." At 21:33, the weather recorded was 290 degrees wind at 7 m/s (14 kn; 25 km/h; 16 mph), visibility 2,000 metres (6,600 ft), showers, low clouds at 210 metres (690 ft), cumulonimbus at 1,200 metres (3,900 ft), temperature at 23 °C (73 °F).

== Accident ==
On 8 May 1997, Flight 3456 took off from Chongqing Jiangbei International Airport at 19:45 local time (UTC+8), expected to arrive Shenzhen Huangtian Airport at 21:30. At 21:07, the Shenzhen Airport approach controller cleared the flight to the approach of Runway 33. At 21:17, the Tower informed the crew "heavy rain on final, advise when spotting the runway". At 21:18:07, the crew stated they have established ILS approach. At 21:18:53, the crew advised ATC that they spotted the approach lightings, and the controller cleared the aircraft to land. The controller was able to see the landing light of the plane, but it was not clear due to the rain. At 21:19:33, the aircraft touched down on the south of the runway, bounced three times, and damaged the aircraft's nose gear, hydraulic systems and flaps. The crew decided to go around.

The aircraft made a left turn while climbing up to 1,200 metres (3,900 ft). The crew were asked to turn on the transponder to show the ATC their position, but the secondary surveillance radar did not receive any signal from the aircraft, indicating the transponder was off. At 21:23:57, the crew informed the ATC they were on the downwind side, and requested other aircraft to clear off the airspace for Flight 3456's landing. At 21:24:40, the crew declared an emergency and requested to clear the approach again. At the time, the main warning, hydraulic system warning and the gear warning were all triggered in the cockpit. At 21:24:58, the crew asked for a full emergency airfield support. The aircraft then turned around, reporting it would land toward the south, which was approved. At 21:28:30, the aircraft skidded off the runway, broke into three pieces and caught on fire, killing 33 passengers and 2 crew members.

== Crash site ==
The first landing attempt was toward north. Debris from the nose gear was found scattered near the southern end of the runway, indicating the left front tyre had exploded during the first touch down. Fallouts including rivets, metal sheets, rubber tube and retaining clip could also be found on the runway surface.

The second landing attempt was toward south. A clear surface scratch from the fuselage was found 427 metres (1,401 ft) from the runway threshold. The aircraft disintegrated after rolling approximately 600 metres (2,000 ft) across the runway and burst into flames. The central part of the fuselage and the trailing edge of the right wing received the most severe burning damage. The front section of the fuselage was 12 metres (39 ft) long with nose pointing north, partially damaged, showing rolling and rotating trace but no signs of burning. A large amount of mire was filled in the deformed cockpit. The rear section was relatively intact, and was the only section not destroyed. The left main gear and the right engine were scattered on the left side of the runway.

== Victims ==
On 9 May 1997, News at 6:30, a national news show aired at TVB Jade, provided a casualty list for the accident.

Nationality	Passengers	Crew	Fatalities	Total
China	42	9	19 (Including 2 crew)	51
Thailand	21	0	16	21
Taiwan	1	0	0	1
Hong Kong	1	0	0	1
Total	65	9	35	74

== Cockpit voice recording ==
External videos
- CVR - China Southern 3456 on YouTube

In June 2007, an audio recording reputed to be the last 12 minutes 27 seconds recorded by the cockpit voice recorder of Flight 3456 was leaked on the Internet. According to an expert from the Civil Aviation Administration of China, the recording is unlikely to be fake.

Partial cockpit communications (translated from Chinese)
- Flight 822's F/O: [ ... ] 1,800 meters (5,900 ft).
- CAP: Extend the gear.
- APP: [ ... ] 822, descend to 1,500 meters (4,900 ft) immediately.
- Flight 822's CAP: Clear to descend to 1,500 meters. Still have visual contact right now.
- APP: There is a plane close to you ahead.
- Flight 822's CAP: Roger.
- CAP: Affirmative, channel intercepted.
- APP: You have no visual in the cloud, right, 822?
- Flight 822's CAP: Yes, [ ... ]
- APP: CZ308, descend to 1,800 meters (5,900 ft) immediately.

(Auto pilot disengaged)

- APP: 308, altitude 2,001 meters (6,565 ft), is it enough?
- Flight CA1305's CAP: Request to descend due to bad weather.
- APP: Negative, maintain 1,500 meters.
- F/O: Three greens for landing gear, greens for flaps 25° AoA and air brakes indicators, [ ... ]
- Flight CA1305's CAP: How about 1,400 meters (4,600 ft)?
- APP: Negative, what's your desired heading?
- Flight CA1305's CAP: Heading 150 now. I can see the bad weather above the runway.
- F/O: Watch the altitude.
- CAP: OK.
- APP: [ ... ] 822, descend to 900 meters (3,000 ft).
- CAP: 3456 is establishing the ILS approach.
- F/O: 3456 is contacting Huangtian tower. 1855, goodbye.
- CAP: Watch the altitude.
- CAP: 3456 established approach, Huangtian.
- TWR: Affirmative. watch the heavy rain.
- CAP: Huangtian to 3456.
- TWR: Go ahead.
- CAP: Er ... we are established approach now.
- TWR: Watch the heading. About 330° wind at 2 m/s on the ground.
- CAP: Roger.
- F/O: Course set to 3.
- CAP: 3.
- TWR: Decision altitude is 60 meters (200 ft), 3456. Go around if fails (to land).
- CAP: Affirmative.
- Flight CA1305's CAP: Do you copy, Shenzhen Ground?
- TWR: Check your bad radio quality.
- CAP: Take your time before turning on landing light.
- F/O: Power ready.
- CAP: Power ready.
- F/O: (Heading) 1 ... 138.
- CAP: Approach lightings in the front. Don't look outside!
- CAP: It's raining heavily, huh.
- F/O: Right.
- CAP: 3456, approach lightings in sight.
- TWR: Land after checking. About 330° wind at 2 m/s (3.9 kn; 7.2 km/h; 4.5 mph) on the ground now.
- CAP: OK.
- F/O: Decision altitude. We are landing. Runway lights in sight. *cough*
- CAP: Roger.
- CAP: Release the rain repellent later.
- FE: OK, I pushed the button for you right now.
- CAP: Glide Slope indicates it is too low.
- F/O: Glide Slope indicates it is too low.

(GPWS warning: GLIDE SLOPE!)

- F/O: Watch your speed! Watch your speed!
- CAP: It's alright to be a little bit higher.
- F/O: Turn left a little bit ...
- CAP: No, don't decrease the power so fast ...
- CAP: Hold, hold on, hold on ...

(1st and 2nd ground contacts)

- CAP: Go around! Increase! Increase the power!
- CAP: Increase the power! Go around!

(3rd ground contact)
(EFIS Master Warning: configuration damage)

- CAP: Increase the power!
- CAP: Flaps 15°.
- F/O: 15°.
- CAP: I can't feel any weight from the yoke!
- FE: What?
- CAP: The yoke is lost control.
- F/O: It's climbing.
- CAP: Gear up!
- FE: It's broken.
- F/O: Failed to gear up?
- FE: Speed (meter) fails, too.
- F/O: *cough*
- CAP: Don't, don't climb too fast. Take it down a little bit.
- F/O: All for nothing, huh?
- CAP: Gears failed right?
- FE: Failed.
- CAP: Don't hurry, don't hurry, don't hurry.
- FE: The rain is so intense, I can't see the ground.
- CAP: Climb! Climb! Climb! Climb a little bit! A little bit!
- F/O: The light is off, pushing the button is useless!
- FE: The yoke is out of control.
- TWR: Huangtian to CZ3456.
- F/O: The warnings keeps ringing.
- CAP: It's just a ringing speaker, clear the warnings.

(EFIS hydraulic system alarm)

- CAP: Climb to altitude 1,200 meters (3,900 ft) now.
- F/O: Ok.
- F/O: The yoke is so light.
- FE: The yoke lost control!
- CAP: Don't climb so fast! Don't climb so fast!
- CAP: CZ3456, go around.
- TWR: Huangtian to 3456.
- CAP: 3456, go around.
- TWR: Is this 3456?
- CAP: Er ... Excuse me?
- TWR: Is this 3456?
- CAP: This is 3456.
- F/O: We can just turn around to land.
- TWR: Can you turn on the transponder? I can't see you.
- F/O: How about turning around to land towards the reverse direction?
- CAP: Not right now, it's raining heavily. Climb to 1,200 meters (3,900 ft) first.
- F/O: It ... It's raining heavily, right?
- CAP: Check my position, 3456.
- TWR: You haven't turn on the transponder yet, identify yourself.
- CAP: I'm identifying.
- TWR: How about the weather there?
- CAP: Power supply is working properly right now.
- F/O: Turn right now?
- CAP: Where to turn?
- FE: Turn right.
- F/O: How about turning left?
- FE: It's bad weather on left side.
- F/O: No problem.
- TWR: Report your position.
- CAP: I just went past Shatian Road, ready to turn left. Check my position using your radar.
- TWR: I don't have you on my radar, report your position.
- F/O: We are now turning left into downwind leg.
- TWR: Keep in downwind, planes on short final.
- F/O: Tell him to go ground, it's not working on my side.
- TWR: What is your altitude right now?
- CAP: Maintaining altitude 1,200 meters (3,900 ft).
- TWR: Maintaining altitude 1,200 meters, right?
- CAP: Right.
- APP: Shenzhen Ground to 3456.
- CAP: Yes, 3456.
- APP: Give me your position, 3456.
- CAP: I am turning to downwind leg right now, notify other planes to avoid.
- APP: Negative, there's a plane 14 kilometers (8.7 mi; 7.6 nmi) away from touchdown point at the altitude of 600 meters (2,000 ft).
- F/O: Tell them we would make a forced landing, we declare an emergency!! Emergency!!
- CAP: We declare an emergency!! Clear them off!!
- F/O: Huh, the brake still works.
- FE: Change to 111.3.
- F/O: Which 111.3?
- FE: ILS frequency.
- F/O: Okay.
- TWR: Huangtian to 3456.
- CAP: Go ahead.
- TWR: Thunders from the south, watch the weather.

(GPWS warning: WIND SHEAR!)

- CAP: Notify other plane to avoid us, we declare an emergency. My plane is warning, clear other planes off.
- TWR: I notified them already. Are you on the downwind leg?
- CAP: Yes, we are on the downwind leg.
- TWR: What's your DME?
- CAP: DME shows 6 nmi (6.9 mi; 11 km) now.
- F/O: Change the frequency to 111.3, right?
- FE: Yes.
- F/O: Turning around to land towards the reverse direction, and we can get down if the weather changes for the better.
- CAP: Isn't it raining heavily right now?
- CAP: Ah, there's the runway.
- F/O: Do we need to choose another brake?
- FE: Do we need one more circle (of hovering)?
- CAP: Er ... 3456 to Huangtian, clear off the other plane. We declare an emergency!!
- TWR: I've already notified them to clear off.
- F/O: I think we lost control.

(Landing gear warning)

- F/O: Request firefighters and ambulances when returned.
- CAP: Er ... Request firefighters and ambulances when landed.
- TWR: Affirmative, I notified them already. I've already notified all the planes to clear off. Cleared to land normally.
- CAP: Affirmative. I will turn around again to land toward ... toward the south.
- TWR: Land toward the south?!
- CAP: Give me my position.
- TWR: What is your position, 3456? I can't see you! Where are you?
- CAP: Altitude 1,200, I am ...
- F/O: Watch the altitude of plane.
- CAP: Er ... I guess I am turning left. North of airport, turning left.
- CAP: Stop descending! Don't descend!
- TWR: I clear off other plane to avoid you.
- CAP: Affirmative.
- TWR: What's your landing direction right now? It's calm wind on the ground.
- CAP: Er ... Report the wind speed for me.
- TWR: It's calm wind on the ground.
- CAP: Er ... Affirmative.

(The CVR got several seconds of damaged recording)

- CAP: I bet the gears are not in good condition. Pay more attention.
- F/O: OK.

(Flaps warning)

- F/O: Have all the planes already cleaned off?
- CAP: Don't ... Don't turn this on!
- TWR: There is no plane left, cleared to land, both runways are clear.
- F/O: I don't know our position.
- CAP: Watch the navigation station.
- TWR: [ ... ] (Other plane) turn right forward, hurry up!
- CAP: In position.
- F/O: Is that the runway?
- FE: I see the runway.
- CAP: Keep your eyes on the runway.
- F/O: I can see the runway!
- FE: Saw it.
- F/O: We are landing.
- CAP: Okay.
- TWR: Huangtian to 3456.
- CAP: Go ahead.
- TWR: Clear to land runway 3 or 4 ... runway 15.
- CAP: Roger, runway in sight, prepare to land.
- TWR: It's cloudy on the south, heavy rain on final.
- CAP: Roger, I am going to land.
- TWR: What is your position now?
- CAP: I am turning on final.
- CP: Is everything all right?
- CAP: Not good. Prepare for the emergency evacuation when landed at worst.
- CP: Alright, anything else?
- CAP: No. Only one minute 'till landing.
- F/O: Watch the speed and the altitude.
- CAP: Hold the throttle.
- F/O: Pay attention ...
- F/O: Are we too high? It's the end of the runway!
- F/O: It's too high, pull back the throttle.

(GPWS warning: SINK RATE! PULL UP!)

- F/O: Hold on!
- CAP: Pull up! Pull up!
- F/O: Sink rate is too high!!
- CAP: Pull up! Pull up! Pull up!
- F/O: Sink rate is too high!!!!!

(Sound of impact)

(End of recording after 15 seconds)

== See also ==
- List of accidents and incidents involving commercial aircraft
- Garuda Indonesia Flight 200
- Delta Air Lines Flight 191
- Flydubai Flight 981
- Aeroflot Flight 1492, an accident in which the airplane also bounced off twice upon landing
- Pakistan International Airlines Flight 8303
