= Garuda Indonesia Flight 200 =

2007 aircraft accident in Indonesia

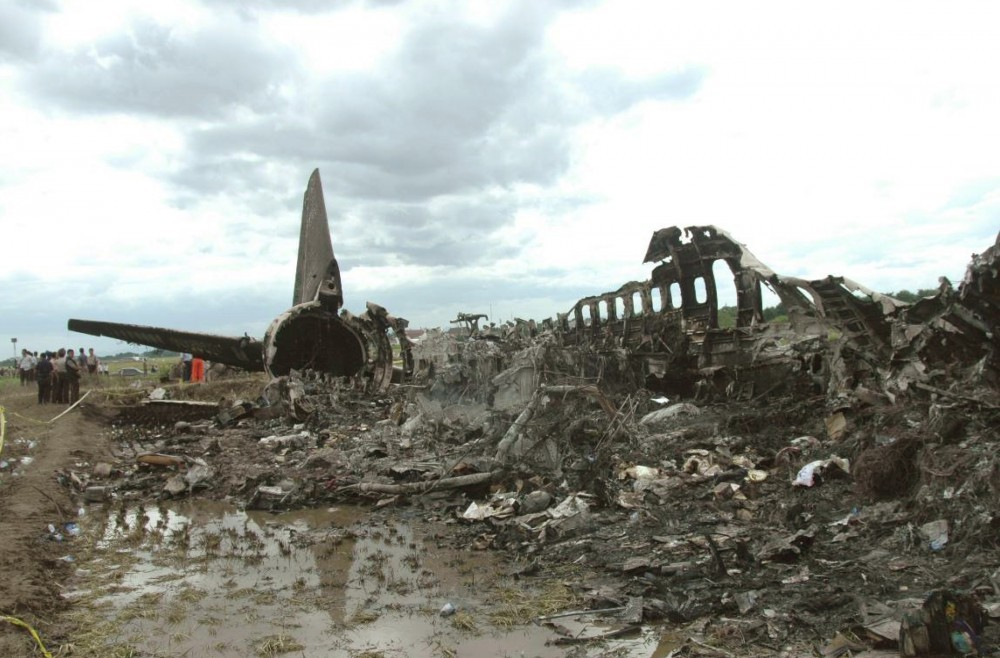
- Wreckage of the aircraft

Accident
- Date: 7 March 2007
- Summary: Runway overrun caused by overspeed approach and improper landing configuration due to pilot error
- Site: Adisutjipto International Airport, Yogyakarta, Indonesia; 7°47′19″S 110°25′11″E

Aircraft
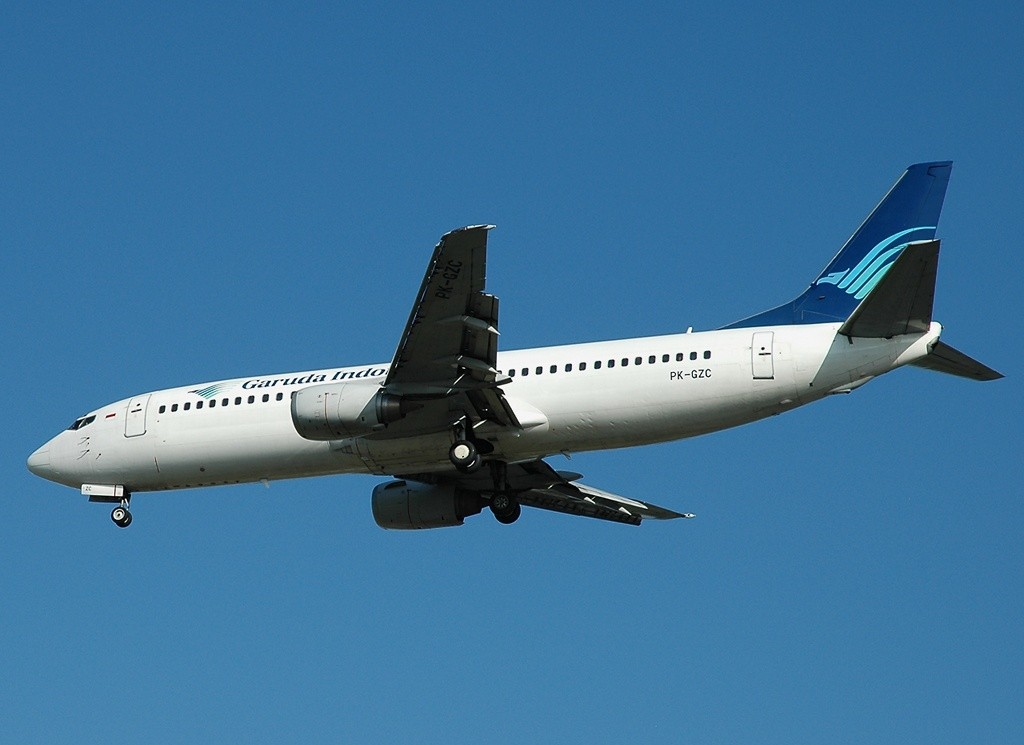
- PK-GZC, the aircraft involved in the accident, pictured in 2005
- Aircraft type: Boeing 737-497
- Operator: Garuda Indonesia
- IATA flight No.: GA200
- ICAO flight No.: GIA200
- Call sign: INDONESIA 200
- Registration: PK-GZC
- Flight origin: Soekarno-Hatta International Airport
- Destination: Adisucipto International Airport
- Occupants: 140
- Passengers: 133
- Crew: 7
- Fatalities: 21
- Injuries: 112
- Survivors: 119

Garuda Indonesia Flight 200 (GA200/GIA200) was a scheduled domestic passenger flight of a Boeing 737-400 operated by Garuda Indonesia between Jakarta and Yogyakarta, Indonesia. The aircraft overran the runway, crashed into a rice field and burst into flames while landing at Adisucipto International Airport on 7 March 2007. Twenty passengers and one flight attendant were killed. Both pilots survived, and were fired shortly after the accident occurred. It was the fifth hull-loss of a Boeing 737 in Indonesia within less than six months and was the most recent accident with fatalities involving the airline.

== Background ==
=== Aircraft ===
The aircraft was a Boeing 737-497, (Note: The aircraft was a Boeing 737-400 model; Boeing assigns a unique customer code for each company that buys one of its aircraft, which is applied as a suffix in the model number at the time the aircraft is built, hence "737-497") registered as PK-GZC. The aircraft had accumulated 35,207 airframe hours and 37,360 cycles since its first flight in 1992.

=== Crew ===
The captain and pilot in command (PIC) was 58-year-old M. Abdul Baist, Born 18 Octobers 1954, who had been with Garuda Indonesia for more than 34 years. He had 26,421 flight hours, including 18,703 hours on the Boeing 737. The first officer was 23-year-old Tyo Nugroho, Born 15 April 1983 who had been with the airline for one year and had 360 flight hours, with 145 Hours of them on the Boeing 737.

=== Garuda Indonesia ===
The national airline of Indonesia (founded in 1949), Garuda Indonesia had received a number of criticisms in the months surrounding the crash. According to Australian aviation experts, Garuda Indonesia had one of the worst safety records among the world's national carriers. Since 1950, Garuda Indonesia has had 13 major accidents. As of 2007, the most recent before this accident was in 2002, when Garuda Indonesia Flight 421 ditched in the Bengawan Solo River due to engine flameout caused by excessive hail ingestion, killing a flight attendant. The deadliest accident was in 1997, when Garuda Indonesia Flight 152 flew into a wooded mountain on approach to Medan, killing 234 people. The managing director of the Centre for Asia Pacific Aviation, Peter Harbison, stated that the major accidents in Indonesian aviation history were all caused by the combinations of airports' and fleets' low safety standards and the poor weather conditions in the area, including severe thunderstorms and other forms of inclement weather.

== Flight ==
Flight GA200 originated in Jakarta and was carrying 133 passengers, 21 of whom were foreigners (10 Australians, 2 Americans, 2 Malaysians, 5 Germans and 2 South Koreans). Several Australian journalists were on the flight, covering the visit of Foreign Affairs Minister Alexander Downer and Attorney-General Philip Ruddock to Java. The journalists were on the flight because the Australian dignitaries' aircraft was at capacity.

At around 7:00 am local time (UTC+7), the captain attempted to land at Adisutjipto International Airport in Yogyakarta, despite a faulty approach with excess speed and steep descent, and the resulting warnings of copilot and flight system. The aircraft touched down 860 metres (2,820 ft) beyond the runway threshold at a speed of 221 knots (409 km/h; 254 mph), 87 knots (161 km/h; 100 mph) faster than the normal landing speed. According to passengers, the aircraft shook violently before it crashed. The aircraft overran the end of the runway, went through the perimeter fence, was heavily damaged when it crossed a road, and stopped in a nearby rice field. A fuel-fed fire ignited, which could not be quickly reached by airport fire-suppression vehicles. While most passengers were able to escape, a number of passengers died inside the burning fuselage.

Captain Komar initially claimed that there was a sudden downdraft immediately before the flight landed, and that the flaps on the aircraft may have malfunctioned.

== Investigation ==
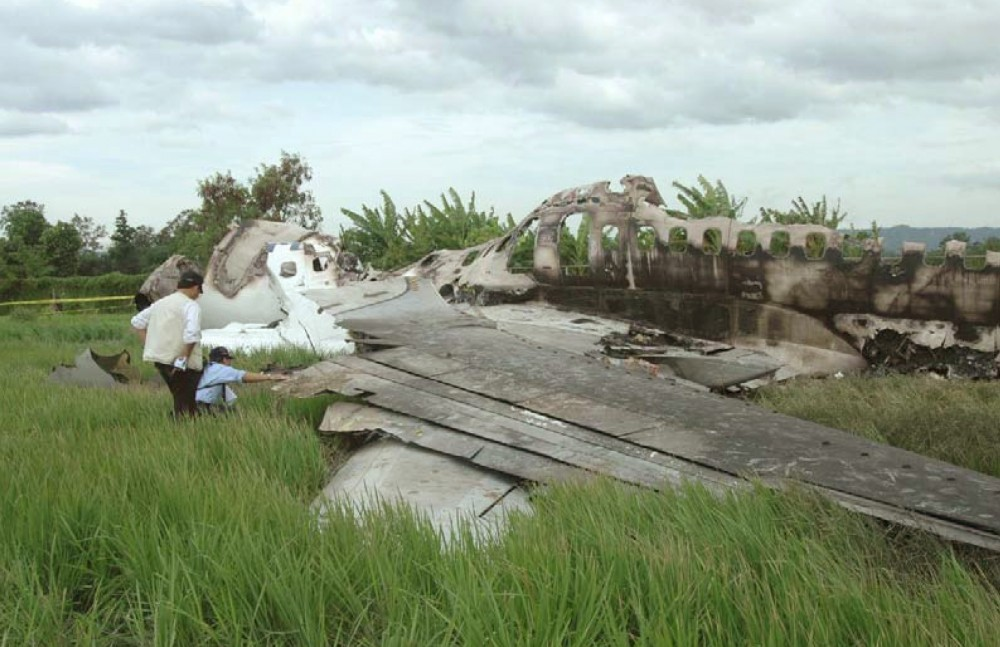
Investigators combing through the accident site.

The accident was investigated by the Indonesian National Transportation Safety Committee (NTSC). Australian Federal Police disaster victim identification experts were also deployed to the scene to assist with the identification of bodies. Australian Transport Safety Bureau (ATSB) staff assisted at the scene by inspecting the wreckage. The United States' National Transportation Safety Board (NTSB) dispatched a team to assist in the investigation, including representatives from Boeing and the Federal Aviation Administration. The flight recorders (flight data recorder and cockpit voice recorder) were removed from the wreckage and flown to the ATSB's headquarters for further analysis using equipment not yet available in Indonesia. Staff in Australia could not extract data from the cockpit voice recorder, which was then sent to Boeing Renton Factory in Renton, Washington (United States) to be analysed.

=== Report of the NTSC ===
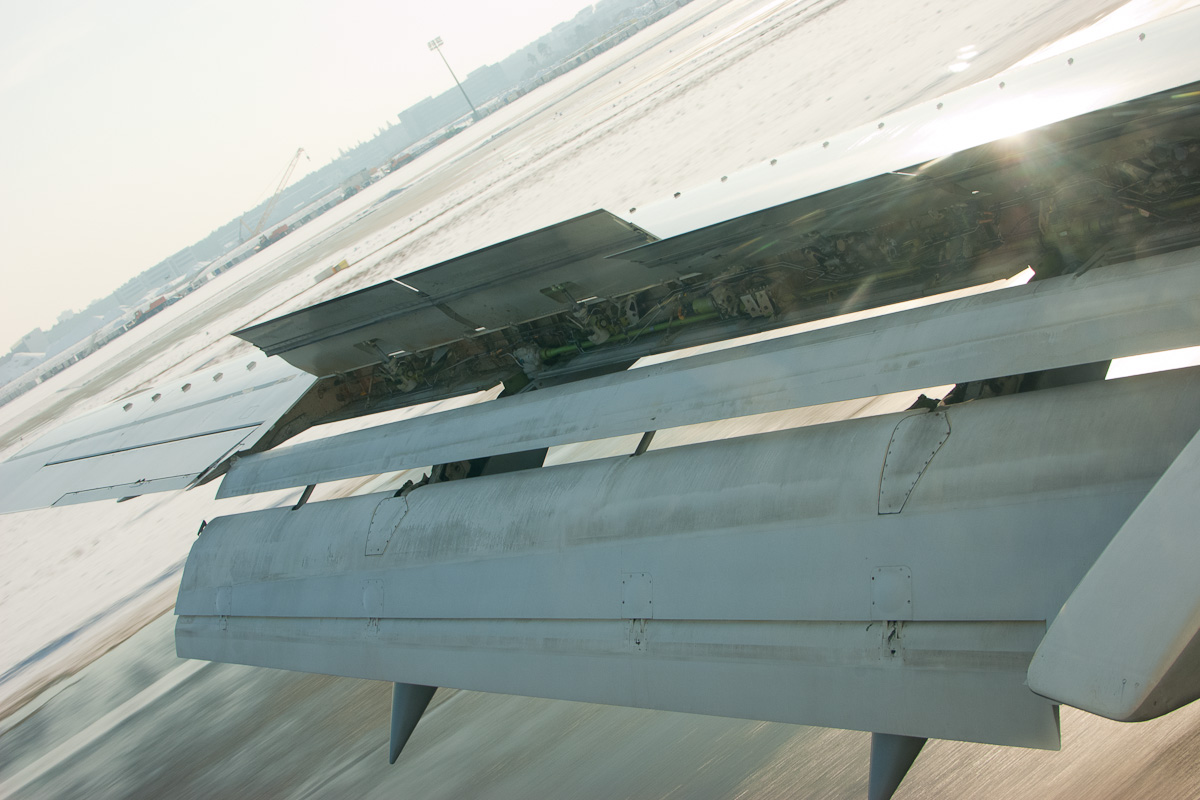
Extended flaps and spoilers of a landing Boeing 737

After the crew members were interviewed, the wreckage was examined, flight data and cockpit voice recordings were analyzed, and a safety review of the airport was conducted, Indonesia's National Transportation Safety Committee released its final report on 22 October 2007. No evidence was found of any defect or malfunction of the aircraft or its systems that could have contributed to the accident. Records showed only the right thrust reverser had been used for the previous 27 sectors, but a fault condition for the left reverser was reset by engineers before departure for this flight, and both were deployed during the landing roll. The weather was calm. It was noted that the Yogyakarta Airport did not conform to international safety standards, having a runway runoff length of 60 metres (200 ft), compared to the recommended length of 90 metres (300 ft).

The key NTSC finding was that the aircraft was flown by the Pilot in Command (PIC) at an excessively steep descent and high airspeed of 241 knots (446 km/h; 277 mph) rather than the normal 141 knots (261 km/h; 162 mph) during the approach and landing, resulting in unstable flight. The PIC's attention became fixated on trying to make the first approach work, and he failed to hear the warnings of the copilot and his recommendations to abort the landing and go around, and the repeated warnings from the aircraft flight systems, which were audible in the voice recorder data, notably the "Sink rate" and "pull up" claxons. The copilot failed to take control of the aircraft in these extraordinary circumstances, as required by airline policy, apparently due to inadequate training. Wing flaps were not fully extended to the maximum 40°, not even to the 15° repeatedly requested by the captain, but only to 5° because the first officer was aware that this was the recommended maximum for that high airspeed, but he failed to notify the captain.

The touchdown, followed by two bounces, began 240 metres (790 ft) beyond the nominal touchdown zone. The nose landing gear was severely damaged and broke apart during the following roll. The main engine thrust reversers were deployed 4 seconds after the touchdown, continued for 7 seconds, but were stowed 7 seconds before the aircraft left the end of the paved runway and ploughed through the airport perimeter fence. About 160 metres (520 ft) beyond the end of the runway, the aircraft crossed a small ditch and adjacent road that was 1–2 metres (3.3–6.6 ft) below the level of both the runway and the rice paddy on the far side. The nose of the aircraft impacted the roadside embankment and the engines impacted the concrete curb just before that embankment. The aircraft came to rest in the rice paddy field 252 metres (827 ft) beyond the runway. It was severely damaged by the impact forces, leading to an intense, fuel-fed fire. Airport fire-control vehicles were unable to reach the crash site through the ruptured fence because of the slope and ditch between there and the road. The firemen were unable to deliver sufficient fire suppression foam on the burning aircraft because the hose that they dragged across the road became punctured by rescue vehicles and onlookers' vehicles driving over it and sharp objects such as the damaged fence. About 45 minutes after the crash, two city fire fighting vehicles arrived and were ordered by an un-qualified person to start hosing the fire with water. The fire was extinguished about 2 hours and 10 minutes after the crash. Coordination and procedures during the rescue were not in accordance with the Airport Emergency Plan (AEP) manual, and lacked coherence.

In summary, the NTSC Report attributed the accident to pilot error.

As of 1 March 2007, Garuda Indonesia had implemented a new fuel efficiency incentive, which awarded a salary bonus if fuel consumption for a flight was lower than nominal. During his interview with the NTSC, the captain denied that this had influenced his decision not to abort the landing.

=== Prosecution of the captain ===
On 4 February 2008, Captain Komar was arrested and charged with six counts of manslaughter. The charge carried a penalty up to life imprisonment if the court found the crash was deliberate. Short of that finding, the lesser charge of negligent flying causing death carries a maximum sentence of seven years. The first officer testified that he had told the captain to go around because of excessive speed, and that he then had blacked out due to the severe buffeting. On 6 April 2009, the captain was found guilty of negligence and sentenced to two years of imprisonment. The captain's lawyers stated their intention to appeal on the basis that the Convention on International Civil Aviation, to which Indonesia is a party, stipulates that aviation accident investigation reports cannot be used to ascribe blame, but only to determine cause. The Garuda Pilots Association and Indonesian Pilots Federation threatened to strike in protest against the conviction. On 29 September 2009, the Indonesian High Court overturned the conviction, finding that the prosecutors had failed to prove that the pilot was "officially and convincingly guilty of a crime". This case was later cited in a report published by the American Bar Association, in a defence of the principle that airline safety is undermined by such prosecutions because the threat of them taking place would impede the investigative processes.

=== EU ban and Garuda's reform ===
Following the crash of Flight 200, the European Union (EU) banned all Indonesian airlines from flying into the EU. The ban was a watershed moment for Garuda, leading to widespread reforms within the airline to improve both its safety and service standards. It led to the implementation of the 5-year Quantum Leap improvement program. Garuda's fleet was nearly doubled with the introduction of new aircraft such as the Boeing 737-800 and Airbus A330-300. Garuda also added more destinations by starting or resuming service to destinations such as Amsterdam and London. The European ban on Garuda was lifted in June 2009, two years after the crash, and the airline resumed service to Europe shortly afterwards with the inauguration of a one-stop service from Jakarta to Amsterdam via Dubai.

== In popular culture ==
The crash is featured in Season 15 episode 8 of Mayday (Air Crash Investigations). The episode is titled "Fatal Focus".

== See also ==
- S7 Airlines Flight 778
- American Airlines Flight 1420
- Air France Flight 358
- China Southern Airlines Flight 3456
- Lion Air Flight 538
- Pegasus Airlines Flight 2193
- Jeju Air Flight 2216
- TAM Airlines Flight 3054 – Overran the runway and killed all 187 people on board plus 12 on the ground
- Malaysia Airlines Flight 2133
- TACA Flight 390
- Aviation safety
- Engineered materials arrestor system
- Ground effect (aerodynamics)
- List of accidents and incidents involving commercial aircraft
- Pilot error
- Runway safety area
