= Aeroflot Flight 1492 =

2019 aviation accident in Russia

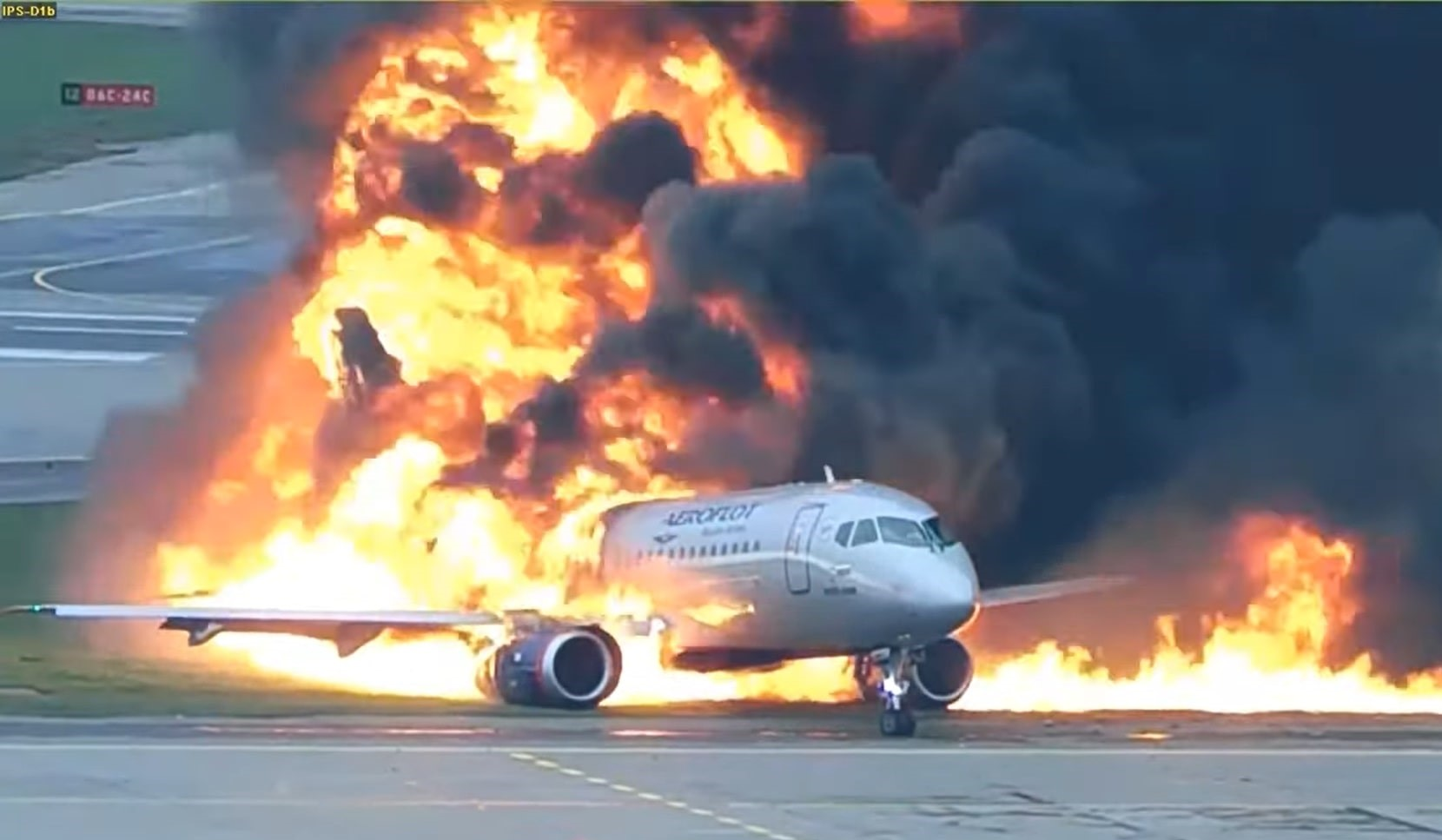
- The aircraft on fire immediately after the emergency landing

Accident
- Date: 5 May 2019
- Summary: Major electrical failure after lightning strike, caught fire during bounced emergency landing
- Site: Sheremetyevo International Airport, Moscow, Russia; 55°58′06″N 37°24′07″E

Aircraft
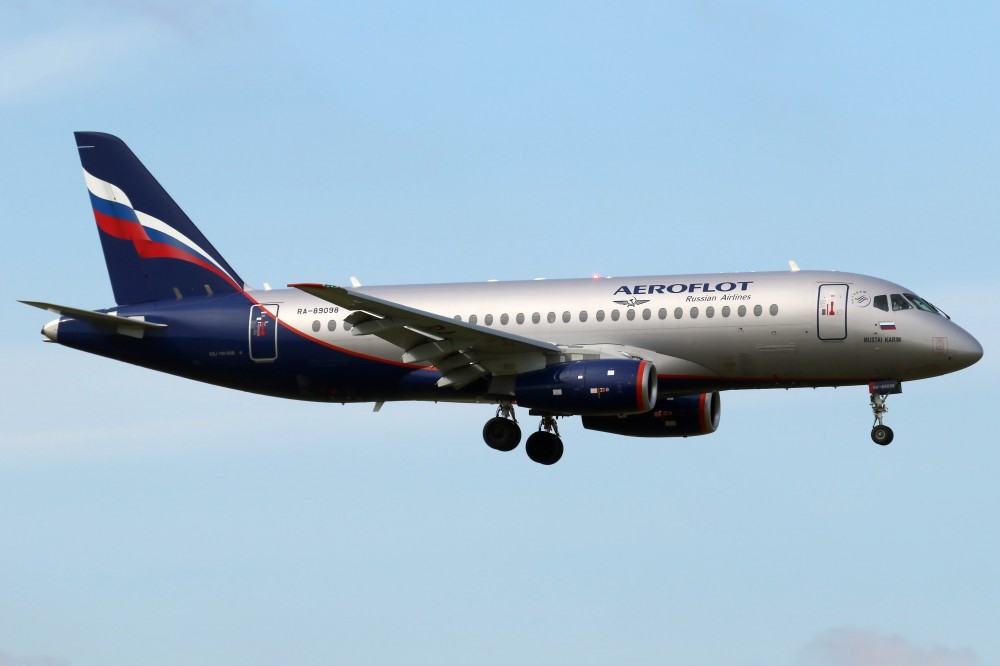
- RA-89098, the aircraft involved in the accident, seen in 2018
- Aircraft type: Sukhoi Superjet 100-95B
- Aircraft name: Mustai Karim
- Operator: Aeroflot
- IATA flight No.: SU1492
- ICAO flight No.: AFL1492
- Call sign: AEROFLOT 1492
- Registration: RA-89098
- Flight origin: Sheremetyevo International Airport, Moscow, Russia
- Destination: Murmansk Airport, Russia
- Occupants: 78
- Passengers: 73
- Crew: 5
- Fatalities: 41
- Injuries: 10
- Survivors: 37

Aeroflot Flight 1492 was a scheduled domestic passenger flight operated by Aeroflot from Moscow–Sheremetyevo to Murmansk, Russia. On 5 May 2019, the Sukhoi Superjet 100 aircraft operating the flight was climbing out when it was struck by lightning. The aircraft suffered an electrical failure and returned to Sheremetyevo for an emergency landing. It bounced on landing and touched down hard, causing the landing gear to collapse, fuel to spill out of the wings, and a fire to erupt. The fire engulfed the rear of the aircraft, killing 41 of the 78 occupants.

== Aircraft ==
The aircraft was a Russian-built Sukhoi Superjet 100, MSN (manufacturer's serial number) 95135, and was registered as RA-89098. The aircraft had accumulated 2,710 flight hours and 1,658 cycles before the accident. Aeroflot Superjets are configured with 87 passenger seats, 12 in business class and 75 in economy class.

== Accident ==
Flight 1492 took off from runway 24C at Sheremetyevo International Airport, bound for Murmansk Airport, on 5 May 2019 at 18:03 local time (15:03 UTC). Towering cumulonimbus (thunderstorm) clouds were observed in the vicinity of the airport with a base of 6,000 feet (1,800 m) and peaking at about 29,000 feet (8,800 m). The clouds were moving in a north-easterly direction at a speed of 40–45 km/h (22–24 kn; 25–28 mph). When the plane was approaching the thunderstorm zone, a 327 degree heading was selected manually at 18:07 local time (15:07 UTC), initiating a right turn earlier than it is prescribed by the КN 24Е standard instrument departure, but the crew did not request active thunderstorm area avoidance clearance. At 15:08 UTC, the aircraft was climbing through flight level 89 (around 8,900 feet or 2,700 metres) when it was struck by lightning. The primary radio and autopilot became inoperative and the flight control mode changed to DIRECT – a degraded, more challenging mode of operation. The captain assumed manual control of the aircraft. The transponder code was changed to 7600 (to indicate radio failure) at 15:09 UTC and subsequently to 7700 (emergency) at 15:26 UTC while on final approach. The secondary radio (VHF2) remained operative and the crew were able to restore communication with air traffic control (ATC) and made a pan-pan call on the emergency frequency.

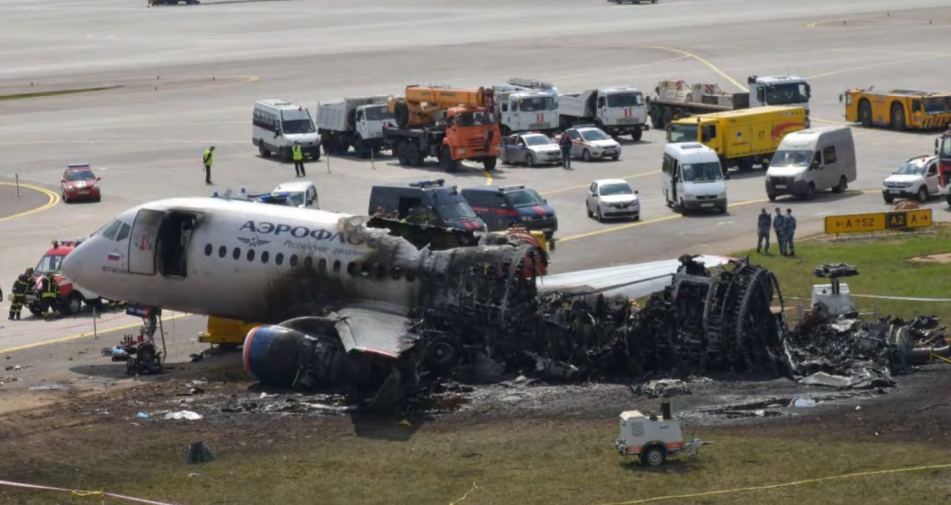
Flight 1492, after the fire

The aircraft stopped its climb at flight level 106 (around 10,600 feet or 3,200 metres) and was guided towards Sheremetyevo by ATC. It performed a right orbit before lining up for approach to runway 24L; the crew tuned into the instrument landing system and the captain flew the approach manually. Upon capturing the glideslope, the aircraft's weight was 43.5 tonnes (43,500 kg; 96,000 lb), 1.6 tonnes (1,600 kg; 3,500 lb) over the maximum landing weight. At 15:18:53 UTC, the captain attempted to contact the controller to request a holding area, but his message was not recorded by the controller's recorder. The flaps were lowered to 25 degrees, which is the recommended setting for an overweight landing in DIRECT mode. The wind was blowing from 190 degrees at 30 knots (56 km/h; 35 mph; 15 m/s) – a 50-degree crosswind – and the speed stabilised at 155 knots (287 km/h; 178 mph). Between 1,100 feet (340 m) and 900 feet (270 m) AGL, the predictive windshear warning sounded repeatedly: "GO-AROUND, WINDSHEAR AHEAD". The crew did not acknowledge this warning on tape. Descending through 260 feet (79 m), the aircraft began to deviate below the glideslope and the "GLIDESLOPE" aural alert sounded. The captain called "advisory" and increased engine thrust, and the speed rose through 164 knots (304 km/h; 189 mph) at 40 feet (12 m) to 170 knots (310 km/h; 200 mph) at 16 feet (4.9 m) AGL – 15 knots (28 km/h; 17 mph) above the required approach speed, although the airline's own Flight Operations Manual provides pilots with a margin of −5 to +20 kt as a criterion for stabilised approach. As he reduced the thrust to idle for the flare, the captain made several large, alternating sidestick inputs, causing the pitch to vary between +6 and −2 degrees.

The aircraft made simultaneous ground contact with all three landing gear legs 900 metres (3,000 ft) beyond the runway threshold at a speed of 158 knots (293 km/h; 182 mph), resulting in a vertical acceleration of 2.55 g. Concurrently with the touchdown, in the span of 0.4 seconds, the sidestick was moved from full aft to full forward. Though the spoilers were armed, automatic spoiler deployment is inhibited in DIRECT mode and they were not extended manually. The aircraft bounced to a height of 6 feet (1.8 m). The captain attempted to apply maximum reverse thrust while he continued to hold the sidestick in the fully forward position. Reverse thrust and reverser door deployment is inhibited in the absence of weight on the aircraft's wheels (i.e. in flight) and the reverser doors only began to open upon the second touchdown. The aircraft lifted off the ground before the reverse door cycle was completed and reverse thrust did not activate. The second touchdown occurred two seconds after the first, nose-first, at a speed of 155 knots (287 km/h; 178 mph) and with a vertical load of 5.85 g. The main landing gear weak links sheared – the weak links are designed to shear under heavy load to minimise damage to the wing – allowing the gear legs to "move up and backwards" and the wing remained intact. The aircraft bounced to a height of 15–18 feet (4.6–5.5 m). The thrust levers were advanced to take-off power – the reverser doors began to close – and the sidestick was pulled full aft in a possible attempt to go around. Thrust was not allowed to increase until the reverser doors were closed and a third impact was recorded at a speed of 140 knots (260 km/h; 160 mph) and with a vertical load in excess of 5 g. The landing gear collapsed, penetrating the wing, and fuel spilled out of the wing tanks. A fire erupted, engulfing the wings, rear fuselage and empennage. Fire alarms sounded in the cockpit for the aft cargo hold and the auxiliary power unit. The aircraft slid down the runway, veered to the left and came to a standstill on the grass between two runway-adjoining taxiways with the nose facing upwind at 15:30 UTC. Power to the engines was cut at 15:31 UTC. Flight recorder data suggest that control over the engines had been lost after the final impact.

An evacuation was carried out from the front passenger doors and their slides were deployed. The first officer used the escape rope to climb out of the right cockpit window. Aeroflot claimed the evacuation took 55 seconds, though video evidence shows the slides still in use 70 seconds after their deployment. Passengers were seen carrying hand luggage out of the aircraft. The rear half of the aircraft was destroyed by the fire, which was extinguished about 45 minutes after landing.

== Passengers and crew ==
Five crew and seventy-three passengers were onboard on the aircraft. The crew consisted of the captain, a first officer, and three cabin crew members. The captain, 42-year-old Denis Yevdokimov, (Russian: Денис Евдокимов) held an airline transport pilot licence and had 6,844 flying hours, including 1,570 on the Superjet. He had previously operated the Ilyushin Il-76 and a number of smaller aircraft for the FSB (2,320 flying hours) and the Boeing 737 for Transaero (2,022 flying hours). He was employed by Aeroflot and had made the transition onto the SSJ-100 in 2016. The 36-year-old first officer Maksim Kuznetsov joined Aeroflot in 2017, held a commercial pilot licence and had 773 hours of flying experience, including 623 on the Superjet.

Forty passengers and the flight attendant (21-year-old Maksim Moiseev) seated in the rear of the aircraft were killed. Forty of the fatalities were Russian and one a US citizen, and twenty-six resided in Murmansk Oblast, including a 12-year-old girl. One crew member and two passengers sustained serious injuries, and three crew members and four passengers minor injuries. The remaining 27 passengers were unharmed.

== Investigation ==
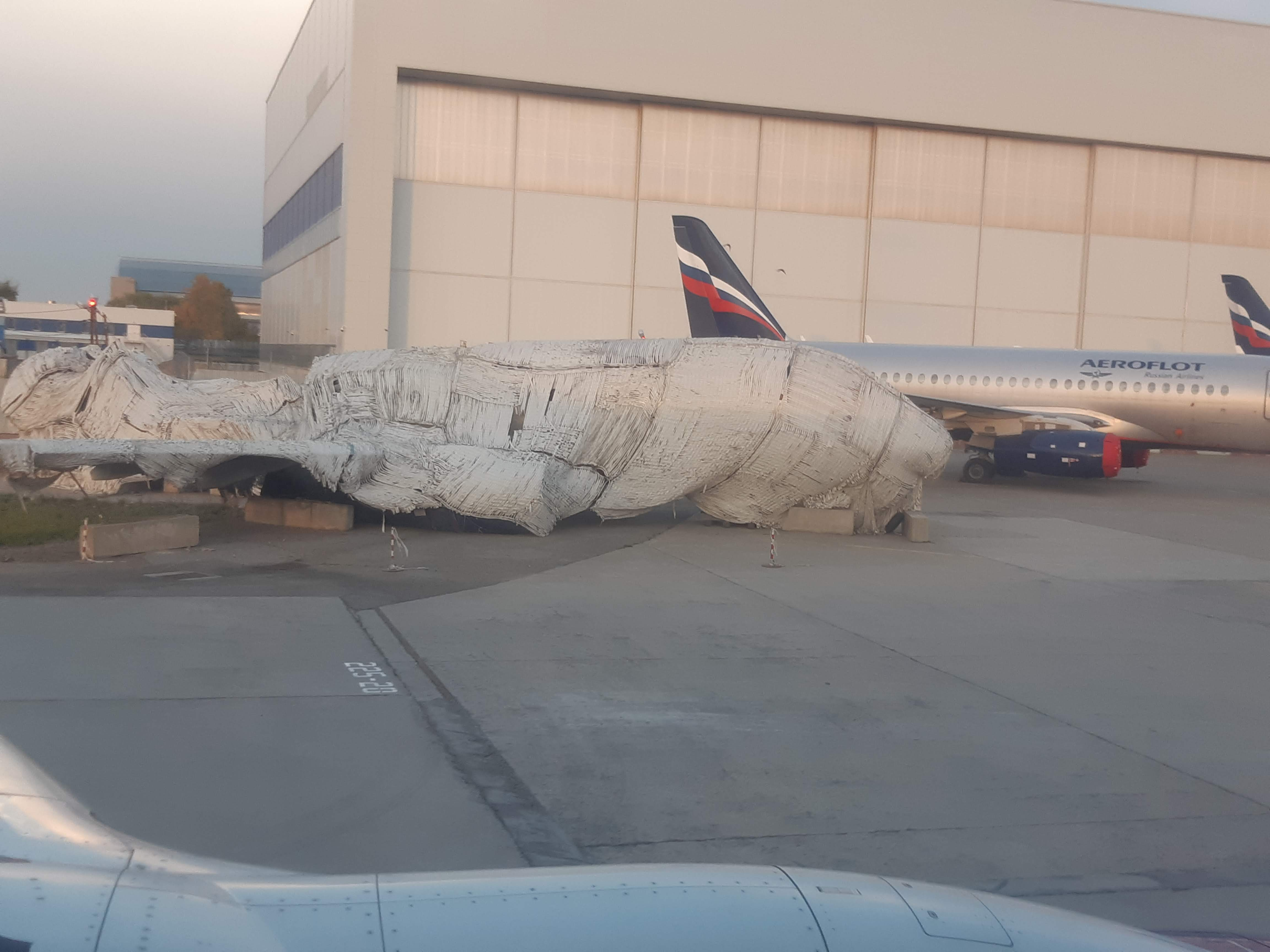
RA-89098 seen covered and stored at Sheremetyevo International Airport in 2020

The Interstate Aviation Committee (IAC) opened an investigation into the accident. The French BEA participated as a representative of the state of design of the aircraft engine and EASA offered technical advice to BEA. Both flight recorders were recovered. The cockpit voice recorder (CVR) was found in satisfactory condition, but the flight data recorder (FDR) casing was damaged by exposure to extremely high temperatures, and data recovery depended on IAC specialists.

Data reading was completed on 17 May 2019, permitting analysis to begin. The IAC sent a follow-up accident report to Rosaviatsiya, the Russian civil aviation authority. Rosaviatsiya issued a safety information bulletin containing a summary of the accident and a number of recommendations.

On 30 May, TASS reported IAC expert Vladimir Kofman was attending the Transport Security Forum where he said that "the disaster occurred because of [the] hard touchdowns". His comment evoked a sharp response from Aeroflot and the IAC issued a six-point press release distancing itself from Kofman. The IAC said they would be conducting an internal investigation and that Kofman was not part of the Flight 1492 investigation. The IAC asked news media to provide video or audio evidence of "published statements made by Kofman". The IAC said they continued to analyse data from the accident and that they were preparing for the 5 June release of the preliminary report, concluding, "in this regard, neither IAC nor other persons currently can not have [sic] reliable information about the establishment by the Investigation team of the causes of the fatal accident".

=== Interim report ===
On 14 June 2019, the IAC published their interim report, presenting a detailed reconstruction of the accident, but did not draw any conclusions. The pilots did not request active storm avoidance from air traffic control. However, they entered the second segment of the departure, initiating a right turn away from the storm earlier than prescribed. The pilot flying had difficulty maintaining altitude in manual flight during an orbiting manoeuvre in a 40-degree bank and deviated by more than 200 ft (61 m) from his assigned altitude, triggering multiple aural alerts. The crew omitted to perform the approach briefing and the approach checklist, and did not set the go-around altitude. The aircraft deviated below the glideslope descending through 270 ft (82 m) AGL and the pilot increased engine thrust; the aircraft accelerated to 15 kn (28 km/h) above its required approach speed. During landing, sidestick inputs were "of an abrupt and intermittent character", including wide-amplitude, sweeping pitch movements not observed during approaches in normal flight law, but similar to other Aeroflot pilots' direct flight law approaches. The report also noted that the pilots ignored a windshear warning that would have required a go-around unless it was spurious. Investigators found traces of lightning impact on antennae, various sensors, exit lights and the cockpit windows. Investigators re-examined the design of the landing gear and found that it met certification requirements. The report cited a material provided by Sukhoi claiming that contemporary certification requirements did not consider the effect of "secondary impacts of the airframe on the ground after the destruction of the landing gear". The interim report did not look into the survival factors of the accident, citing that they were still being analyzed and would be included in the final report.

In May 2022, in a status update marking the third anniversary of the accident, the IAC noted that it expected to issue the draft final report shortly. Multiple aircraft systems have been investigated; some decrypted data from the Curtiss-Wright fire protection units is not available to the investigators due to intellectual property issues.

=== Final report ===
The final report, issued on March 28, 2025, found no design flaws that would prohibit operation. Investigators concluded that the hard landing was due to human factors, namely the captain's difficulty controlling the aircraft in direct flight control law mode. Also the report noted that deficiencies in the operational documentation were factors that contributed to the accident. Notwithstanding, the inquiry recommended a review of the landing gear design and of the possibility of restoring normal flight control law, as well as an analysis of crew workload faced with multiple failure messages. Additional crew training on piloting issues in direct law was also advised.

== Criminal proceedings ==
A criminal investigation was opened into a fatal "violation of the rules of safe movement and exploitation of air transport". The Investigative Committee said on 6 May 2019 it was considering insufficient skill of the pilots, dispatchers and those who performed the technical inspection of the plane, along with mechanical problems and poor weather, as a possible cause of the accident. A high-ranking law enforcement source told Lenta.ru that experts would examine the actions of Sheremetyevo's fire and rescue service. The source said air traffic control were late with raising the alarm and fire engines had not left the fire station at the time of the accident. Only two of the six available fire engines were involved within the first six minutes and they were not filled with foam, which is more effective against a fuel-fed fire than water.

Investigators filed charges against the captain in October 2019, seeking a seven-year prison term. According to a spokeswoman for the Russian Investigative Committee, his actions "violated the existing regulations and led to the destruction and outbreak of fire".

On 20 June 2023, the court sentenced the captain Denis Yevdokimov to 6 years in a colony-settlement. His lawyer said that the defence was dissatisfied with the verdict and planned to study it and then appeal.

== Aftermath ==
=== Evacuation with luggage ===
There was widespread speculation that the evacuation was delayed by passengers retrieving hand luggage, prompted by video footage showing passengers leaving the plane with luggage in hand. According to TASS, citing a law enforcement source, the majority of passengers in the tail end of the aircraft had practically no chance of rescue; many of them did not have time to unfasten their seat belts. He added that those passengers from the tail section of the aircraft who managed to escape had moved to the front of the aircraft before it stopped, and that he had no confirmation that retrieval of luggage had slowed the evacuation. Speculation that the observed retrieval of luggage caused an evacuation delay was rejected by one anonymous witness.

=== Response from Aeroflot ===
On 6 May 2019, Aeroflot announced that it would compensate surviving passengers and the families of the dead. Passengers who did not require hospitalization were to receive 1,000,000 rubles (US$15,320), passengers who were hospitalized were to receive 2,000,000 rubles ($30,640), and the families of the dead were to receive 5,000,000 rubles ($76,600).

Following the release of the accident summary by Rosaviatsiya on 17 May, it was reported in the media that the pilots had failed to set some of the surfaces of the wing – variously referred to as the "flaps", "brakes" and "air brakes" in news reports – for landing. On the same day, Aeroflot issued a statement in which it denied the pilots had violated company procedures. Aeroflot said the flaps were properly configured for landing and that the spoilers should be extended manually only when reverse thrust is applied and the aircraft has settled on the runway. The airline said preliminary information by Rosaviatsiya is not evidence of pilot error and criticised the media for jumping to conclusions.

=== Cancellations and public perception ===
On 5 May 2019, a petition to ground the Sukhoi Superjet 100 (SSJ100) during the investigation was launched on Change.org. On 8 May, it had collected over 140,000 signatures and, when asked, Kremlin Press Secretary Dmitry Peskov said the decision should be taken by the competent aviation authorities and not by citizens who sign petitions on the Change.org portal. The Ministry of Transport of Russia decided against grounding the SSJ100, stating there was no obvious sign of a design flaw.

Aeroflot cancelled approximately 50 SSJ100 flights in the week after the accident. Kommersant cited industry sources as saying the SSJ100 had lower dispatch reliability than Airbus and Boeing aircraft in the airline's fleet historically and attributed a rise in cancellations to "increased safety measures" at Aeroflot while the accident is investigated. The SSJ100 suffered a number of technical failures in the weeks following the accident which attracted media attention in Russia. On 18 May 2019, an Aeroflot SSJ100 from Ulyanovsk to Moscow–Sheremetyevo aborted its take-off due to a hydraulics failure indication following which the passengers refused to fly on the Superjet.

On 17 May 2019, it was reported that Russian regional airline RusLine abandoned its plans to operate 18 SSJ100s. According to the owner, this is because of the "likely reputational risks" associated with the accident. On 22 May, the Russian airline Alrosa retired its Tupolev Tu-134 fleet, announcing that it was not abandoning plans to replace the Tu-134 with up to three SSJ100 by 2021 "despite all the hysteria".

On 24 May 2019, the Russian Association of Air Transport Operators (AEVT) requested a review of the SSJ100 for compliance with certification requirements in a letter sent to Minister of Transport Yevgeny Dietrich. The AEVT questioned whether electrical supply should have been disrupted by the lightning strike and whether the fuel system should have been compromised by impact forces. The letter said the flight control system, engines, cabin protection from an external fire and the crew training programme should all be examined for compliance. United Aircraft Corporation, the manufacturer of the Superjet, said the AEVT appeared to apply pressure on the technical investigation. As of 28 May, AEVT members operated 19 SSJ100s. Aeroflot, the operator of the accident aircraft, is not a member of the AEVT.

== See also ==
- 2012 Mount Salak Sukhoi Superjet crash
- 2019 in aviation
- 2019 in Russia
- Aeroflot accidents and incidents
- LANSA Flight 508 – 1971 accident after the aircraft suffered a lightning strike
- List of accidents and incidents involving airliners by location#Russia
- List of accidents and incidents involving commercial aircraft
- Pan Am Flight 214 – 1963 accident after the aircraft suffered a lightning strike
- 1985 Manchester Airport disaster — Accident of a British Airtours 737-200 similarly scrutinized for its evacuation after an engine failure caused the rear of the aircraft to be almost identically engulfed in flames
