= FedEx Express Flight 14 =

1997 aircraft accident in New Jersey

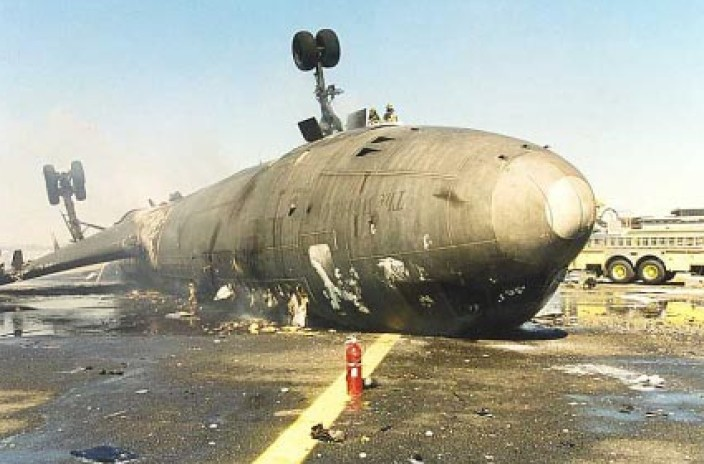
- Wreckage of the aircraft after the fire was extinguished

Accident
- Date: July 31, 1997
- Summary: Crashed on landing due to pilot error
- Site: Newark Liberty International Airport runway 22R, Newark, New Jersey, United States; 40°41′14″N 74°10′27″W

Aircraft
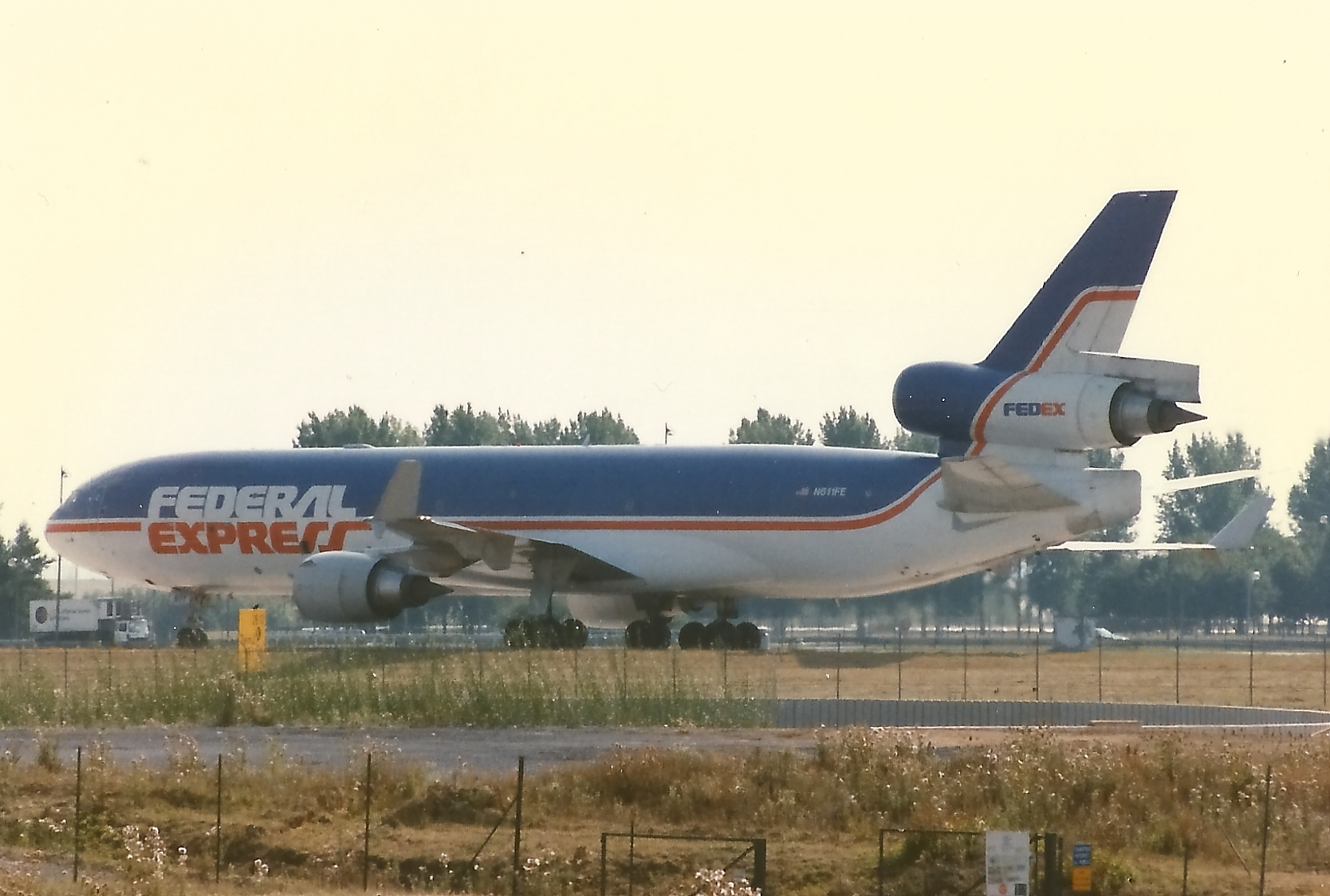
- N611FE, the aircraft involved in the accident, seen in 1996 with a previous livery
- Aircraft type: McDonnell Douglas MD-11F
- Aircraft name: Joshua
- Operator: FedEx Express
- IATA flight No.: FX14
- ICAO flight No.: FDX14
- Call sign: FEDEX 14
- Registration: N611FE
- Flight origin: Changi Airport, Changi, Singapore
- 1st stopover: Penang International Airport, Penang, Malaysia
- 2nd stopover: Taoyuan International Airport, Taipei, Taiwan
- Last stopover: Ted Stevens Anchorage International Airport, Anchorage, Alaska, United States
- Destination: Newark Liberty International Airport, Newark, New Jersey, United States
- Occupants: 5
- Passengers: 3
- Crew: 2
- Fatalities: 0
- Injuries: 5
- Survivors: 5

FedEx Express Flight 14 was a scheduled cargo flight from Singapore to Newark, New Jersey, via Malaysia, Taiwan, and Alaska. On July 31, 1997, the McDonnell Douglas MD-11 flying this route crashed during a landing on its final segment at Newark Liberty International Airport, inverting and catching fire, injuring all five people on board.

== Summary ==
Flight 14 crashed while landing on runway 22R at Newark Airport on July 31, 1997. The flight originated in Singapore with intermediate stops in Penang, Malaysia, followed by Taipei, Taiwan, and then Anchorage, Alaska. In addition to the Captain and First Officer there were three passengers on board, including one riding in the jump seat.

During the flight, the pilots were concerned that they would have little stopping distance after landing, and the captain said that he wanted to put the aircraft down early on the runway. The aircraft had departed with one thrust reverser (on the left engine) inoperative, and the pilots knew of incidents in the aircraft's maintenance log where the auto-brakes had failed to activate during landings. They had also misinterpreted the runway data, and so believed they had less stopping distance than was actually available.

The landing was normal until the beginning of the flare phase. The MD-11 touched down, bounced, and rolled to the right. On the second touchdown, about 1,100 feet (340 m) later, the right gear snapped and the No. 3 engine (right wing engine) contacted the runway, with the right roll continuing until the right wing spars broke. The aircraft came to rest off the right side of the runway, inverted, and on fire. All five occupants escaped through a cockpit window. The airplane was destroyed by fire.

== Aircraft and crew ==
The aircraft, named Joshua by FedEx, construction number 48603 and line number 553, was a McDonnell Douglas MD-11F freight model, powered by three General Electric CF6-80C2D1F engines. Registered in the United States as N611FE, the aircraft was delivered new to FedEx in September 1993. Prior to the crash, the aircraft had a total of 13,034 flight hours and 2,950 flight cycles (a flight cycle is defined as a takeoff and landing), and had been involved in two prior incidents. In January 1994, it sustained underbelly damage during a bounced landing at Memphis International Airport. Then in November 1994, the aircraft was involved in a tailstrike at Ted Stevens Anchorage International Airport. Permanent repairs were made from the Anchorage incident within days of the tailstrike, and permanent repairs to the Memphis incident were made at the next C check in August 1995.

The captain was 46-year-old Robert M. Freeman who joined FedEx in 1988 when it bought Flying Tiger Line, which he had previously worked for since 1978. Freeman had logged a total of 11,000 flight hours, including 1,253 hours on the MD-11. The first officer was 39-year-old Donald E. Goodin, who had been with FedEx since 1994, having served as a former U.S. Air Force pilot from 1977 to 1994 and had 3,703 flight hours, though only 592 of them were with FedEx. Goodin only had 95 hours on the MD-11.

== Investigation ==
The National Transportation Safety Board (NTSB) conducted a full investigation of the accident and concluded that the probable cause was the captain's over-control of the aircraft during the landing and his failure to go around after a destabilized flare. Beginning about 17 feet (5.2 m) above the runway, the captain had let the nose lower, probably to achieve an earlier touchdown, then raised it and increased thrust to slow the plane's descent, then pushed the nose down again (around the time of the first touchdown) to try to keep the plane on the runway. These last control inputs were "too late and too large" to stabilize the landing, and the plane's high sink rate and rightward roll compressed the right landing gear strut at the second touchdown, which broke the right wing rear spar and ruptured the right fuel tank.

=== Safety recommendations ===
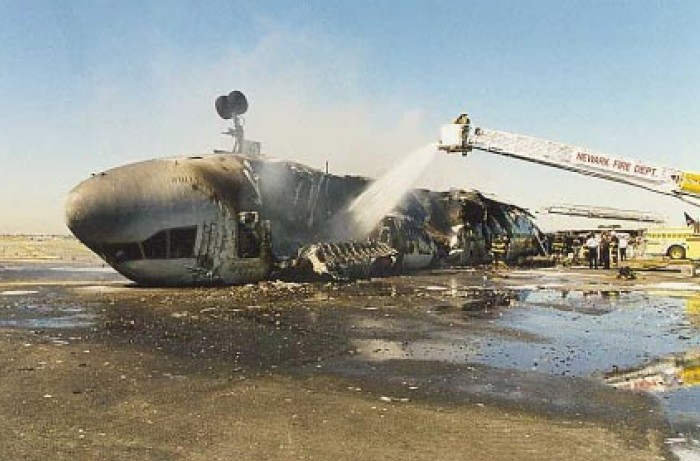
The aftermath of Flight 14 from a different angle

As a result of its investigation of this accident, the NTSB made new recommendations based on their findings and conclusions to improve the safety of operations of the MD-11 type aircraft including that the FAA develop new pilot training tools to "include information about factors that can contribute to structural failures involving the landing gear, wings, and fuselage, such as design sink rate limits; roll angle limits; control inputs' roll rate; pitch rate; single-gear landings; the effect of decreased lift; and structural loading consequences of bottoming landing gear struts and tires; provide a syllabus for simulator training on the execution of stabilized approaches to the landing flare, the identification of unstabilized landing flares, and recovery from these situations, including proper high sink rate recovery techniques during flare to landing, techniques for avoiding and recovering from overcontrol in pitch before touchdown, and techniques for avoiding overcontrol and premature derotation during a bounced landing; and to promote an orientation toward a proactive go-around."

== Aftermath ==
For his role in the accident, Captain Freeman was fired from FedEx on October 30, 2000. However, the FedEx pilot union criticized the decision and announced that they would appeal it, citing that the crash was caused by aircraft design flaws.

== In popular media ==
The crashes of FedEx Express Flight 14, and a similar crash in 2009 of another MD-11, FedEx Express Flight 80 at Narita International Airport in Japan, were both covered in 2015 in "The Final Push", a Season 14 episode of the internationally syndicated Canadian TV documentary series Mayday.

== See also ==
- Delta Connection Flight 4819 – a CRJ-900 that bounced and flipped on landing in 2025
- FedEx Express Flight 80 - another FedEx MD-11 that bounced and flipped on landing
