= List of aircraft by tail number =

This list is only of aircraft that have an article, indexed by aircraft registration "tail number" (civil registration or military serial number). The list includes aircraft that are notable either as an individual aircraft or have been involved in a notable accident or incident or are linked to a person notable enough to have a stand-alone Wikipedia article.

== Military ==
=== Algeria ===
| Tail number | Description | Related article |
| 7T-WHM | Lockheed C-130H-30 Hercules | 2014 Algerian Air Force C-130 crash |
| 7T-WIV | Ilyushin Il-76 | 2018 Algerian Air Force Il-76 crash |

=== Angola ===
| Tail number | Description | Related article |
| T-500 | Embraer EMB 120 Brasilia | 2011 Angolan Air Force crash |

=== Australia ===
| Tail number | Description | Related article |
| A16-97 | Lockheed Hudson | 1940 Canberra air disaster |
| L9162 | Avro Anson | 1940 Brocklesby mid-air collision |
| N16-100 | Westland Sea King | 2005 Nias Island WS-61 Sea King crash |
| N4876 | Avro Anson | 1940 Brocklesby mid-air collision |

=== Bangladesh ===
| Tail number | Description | Related article |
| 701 | Chengdu F-7BGI | 2025 Dhaka fighter jet crash |

=== Belgium ===
| Tail number | Description | Related article |
| CH-06 | Lockheed C-130 Hercules | 1996 Belgian Air Force Hercules accident |

=== Canada ===
| Tail number | Description | Related article |
| 3309 | Harvard Mk II | Trans-Canada Air Lines Flight 9 |
| 115461 | De Havilland Canada DHC-5 Buffalo | Buffalo 461 |

=== Chile ===
| Tail number | Description | Related article |
| 966 | CASA C-212 Aviocar 300DF | 2011 Chilean Air Force CASA 212 crash |

=== China ===
| Tail number | Description | Related article |
| 81192 | Shenyang J-8II | Hainan Island incident |

=== Colombia ===
| Tail number | Description | Related article |
| FAC-1016 | Lockheed C-130H Hercules | 2026 Colombian Air Force Lockheed C-130 crash |

=== France ===
| Tail number | Description | Related article |
| Dixmude / LZ 114 | Airship | Dixmude (airship) |
| Patrie | Semi-rigid airship | Patrie (airship) |
| La République | Semi-rigid airship | La République (airship) |

=== Germany ===
| Tail number | Description | Related article |
| 30+91 | Eurofighter Typhoon | 2014 Olsberg mid-air collision |
| LZ 1 | Experimental airship | Zeppelin LZ 1 |
| LZ 2 | Experimental airship | LZ 2 |
| Hansa (c/n LZ 13) | Rigid airship | LZ 13 Hansa |
| L 19 (c/n LZ 54) | Rigid airship | LZ 54 (L 19) |
| L 21 (c/n LZ-61) | Rigid airship | LZ 61 (L 21) |
| L 59 (c/n LZ 104) | Rigid airship | LZ 104 (L 59) |

=== Greece ===
| Tail number | Description | Related article |
| 084 | General Dynamics F-16 Fighting Falcon | 2015 Los Llanos Air Base crash |

=== India ===
| Tail number | Description | Related article |
| K2729 | Antonov An-32 | 1986 Indian Air Force An-32 disappearance |
| K2743 | Antonov An-32 | 2016 Indian Air Force An-32 disappearance |
| K2752 | Antonov An-32 | 2019 Indian Air Force An-32 crash |
| ZP 5164 | Mil Mi-17 | 2021 Indian Air Force Mil Mi-17 crash Bipin Rawat |

=== Indonesia ===
| Tail number | Description | Related article |
| A-1310 | Lockheed C-130 Hercules | 2015 Indonesia Hercules C-130 crash |
| A-1325 | Lockheed L-100-30(P) Hercules | 2009 Indonesian Air Force L-100-30(P) crash |
| A-1334 | Lockheed C-130 Hercules | 2016 Indonesian Air Force Lockheed C-130 Hercules crash |
| A-2703 | Fokker F27-400M Friendship | 2009 Indonesian Air Force Fokker F27-400M crash |
| A-2708 | Fokker F27-400M Friendship | 2012 Indonesian Air Force Fokker F27 crash |

=== Iran ===
| Tail number | Description | Related article |
| 5-8208 | Ilyushin Il-76MD Adnan 2 | 2009 Iranian Air Force Il-76MD Adnan 2 accident |
| 5-8519 | Lockheed C-130E Hercules | 2005 Iranian Air Force C-130 crash |
| 5-8521 | Lockheed C-130E Hercules | 1994 Iranian Air Force C-130 shootdown |
| 6-9221 | Bell 212 | 2024 Varzaqan helicopter crash |
| 15-2280 | Ilyushin Il-76MD | 2003 Iran Ilyushin Il-76 crash |

=== Israel ===
| Tail number | Description | Related article |
| 357 | CH-53 Sea Stallion Yas'ur 2000 | 1997 Israeli helicopter disaster |
| 903 | CH-53 Sea Stallion Yas'ur 2000 | 1997 Israeli helicopter disaster |

=== Italy ===
| Tail number | Description | Related article |
| MM54386 | Aermacchi MB-326 | 1990 Italian Air Force MB-326 crash |

=== Japan ===
| Tail number | Description | Related article |
| 4593 | Mitsubishi A6M Zero | Akutan Zero |
| 92-7932 | North American F-86 Sabre | All Nippon Airways Flight 58 |
| B11-120 | Mitsubishi A6M Zero | Niihau incident |
| T1-323 | Mitsubishi G4M | Operation Vengeance |

=== Kazakhstan ===
| Tail number | Description | Related article |
| UP-72859 | Antonov An-72-100 | 2012 Kazakhstan Antonov An-72 crash |

=== Laos ===
| Tail number | Description | Related article |
| RDPL-34020 | Antonov An-74TK-400 | 2014 Lao People's Liberation Army Air Force An-74 crash |

=== Malaysia ===
| Tail number | Description | Related article |
| M502-6 | Eurocopter Fennec | 2024 Lumut mid-air collision |
| M503-3 | AgustaWestland AW139 | 2024 Lumut mid-air collision |

=== Myanmar ===
| Tail number | Description | Related article |
| 5820 | Shaanxi Y-8F-200 | 2017 Myanmar Air Force Shaanxi Y-8 crash |

=== Morocco ===
| Tail number | Description | Related article |
| CNA-OQ | Lockheed C-130H Hercules | 2011 Royal Moroccan Air Force Lockheed C-130 Hercules crash |

=== Nigeria ===
| Tail number | Description | Related article |
| NAF033 | Dornier 228 | 2006 Nigerian Air Force Dornier 228 crash |

=== Norway ===
| Tail number | Description | Related article |
| 5630 | Lockheed Martin C-130J Super Hercules | 2012 Norwegian C-130 crash |
| KK-N | Boeing-Canada PB2B-1 Catalina IVB | 1954 Bjørnøya Consolidated PBY Catalina crash |

=== Peru ===
| Tail number | Description | Related article |
| AE-560 | Fokker F27 Friendship | 1987 Alianza Lima air disaster |

=== Philippines ===
| Tail number | Description | Related article |
| 5125 | Lockheed C-130H Hercules | 2021 Philippine Air Force C-130 crash |
| 2100925 | Douglas C-47 Skytrain | 1957 Cebu Douglas C-47 crash |

=== Poland ===
| Tail number | Description | Related article |
| 019 | EADS CASA C-295 | Mirosławiec air accident |
| 101 | Tupolev Tu-154M | 2010 Polish Air Force Tu-154 crash |
| SP-LAA | Ilyushin Il-62 | LOT Polish Airlines Flight 007 |
| SP-LBG | Ilyushin Il-62M | LOT Polish Airlines Flight 5055 |

=== Russia ===
| Tail number | Description | Related article |
| RF-76551 | Ilyushin Il-76MD | 2024 Ivanovo Ilyushin Il-76 crash |
| RF-86868 | Ilyushin Il-76M | 2024 Korochansky Ilyushin Il-76 crash |
| RF-92955 | Antonov An-26 | 2018 Antonov An-26 crash |
| RF-94591 | Let L-410UVP-E | 2021 Parachute Menzelinsk Let L-410UVP-E crash |

=== Slovakia ===
| Tail number | Description | Related article |
| 5605 | Antonov An-24 | 2006 Slovak Air Force Antonov An-24 crash |

=== South Africa ===
| Tail number | Description | Related article |
| 6840 | Douglas C-47TP | 2012 SAAF Dakota crash |

=== Soviet Union ===
| Tail number | Description | Related article |
| 101 | Antonov An-26 | Aeroflot Flight SSSR-65856 |

=== Sweden ===
| Tail number | Description | Related article |
| 47002 | Consolidated PBY Catalina | Catalina affair |

=== Switzerland ===
| Tail number | Description | Related article |
| HB-HOT | Junkers Ju 52/3m4ge | 2018 Ju-Air Junkers Ju 52 crash |
| HB-IMD | Convair CV-440-11 | 1956 Swissair Convair CV-440 crash |

=== Syria ===
| Tail number | Description | Related article |
| YK-AND | Antonov An-26 | 2015 Syrian Air Force An-26 crash |

=== Taiwan ===
| Tail number | Description | Related article |
| 933 | Sikorsky UH-60 Black Hawk | 2020 New Taipei helicopter crash |

=== Ukraine ===
| Tail number | Description | Related article |
| 76 | Antonov An-26 | 2020 Chuhuiv An-26 crash |
| 76777 | Ilyushin Il-76MD | Ukrainian Air Force Ilyushin Il-76 shoot-down |

=== United Kingdom ===
| registration number | aircraft type | related article |
|---|---|---|
| 1 | British Army Aeroplane No 1 | British Army Aeroplane No 1 |
| 1 | Rigid airship | HMA No. 1 |
| AH574 | Bell P-39 Airacobra | AH574 |
| HE274 | Vickers Wellington | 1946 Rabat Vickers Wellington crash |
| J7557 | Beardmore Inflexible | Beardmore Inflexible |
| K7381 | Hawker Audax | Edmonton air crash |
| L6103 | De Bruyne Snark | De Bruyne Snark |
| LN514 | Vickers Wellington | Vickers Wellington LN514 |
| MW248 | Avro York | Northwood mid-air collision |
| PA278 | Avro Lancaster | Lancaster PA278 disappearance |
| PA474 | Avro Lancaster | Avro Lancaster PA474 |
| PZ865 | Hawker Hurricane | Hawker Hurricane PZ865 |
| R2492 | Martin-Baker MB 3 | Martin-Baker MB 3 |
| R2496 | Martin-Baker MB 5 | Martin-Baker MB 5 |
| RF531 | Avro Lincoln | 1953 Avro Lincoln shootdown incident |
| S1589 | Short Sarafand | Short Sarafand |
| SR392 | Miles M.39B Libellula | Miles M.39B Libellula |
| SW344 | Avro Lancaster | 1952 Luqa Avro Lancaster crash |
| T2564 | Vickers Wellington | 1942 Ruislip Wellington accident |
| TG577 | Handley Page Hastings | 1965 Little Baldon Hastings accident |
| TX270 | Avro Lancaster GR3 | 1953 Mediterranean Sea aircraft collision |
| VV243 | Avro Anson T21 | 1949 Exhall mid-air collision |
| VX158 | Short Sperrin | Short Sperrin |
| VX161 | Short Sperrin | Short Sperrin |
| VX562 | Vickers Valetta C1 | 1953 Mediterranean Sea aircraft collision |
| VX770 | Avro Vulcan | 1958 Syerston Avro Vulcan crash |
| W4783 | Avro Lancaster | G for George |
| WB491 | Avro Ashton | Avro Ashton |
| WG236 | de Havilland DH.110 | 1952 Farnborough Airshow DH.110 crash |
| WJ474 | Vickers Valetta T3 | 1954 Aldbury Valetta accident |
| WT629 | Hawker Hunter F1 | 1956 Hawker Hunter multiple aircraft accident |
| WT639 | Hawker Hunter F1 | 1956 Hawker Hunter multiple aircraft accident |
| WT692 | Hawker Hunter F1 | 1956 Hawker Hunter multiple aircraft accident |
| WV372 | Hawker Hunter | 2015 Shoreham Airshow crash |
| WW603 | Hawker Hunter F1 | 1956 Hawker Hunter multiple aircraft accident |
| WW633 | Hawker Hunter F1 | 1956 Hawker Hunter multiple aircraft accident |
| WW635 | Hawker Hunter F1 | 1956 Hawker Hunter multiple aircraft accident |
| XE521 | Fairey Rotodyne | Fairey Rotodyne |
| XF442 | Hawker Hunter FGA.9 | Hawker Hunter Tower Bridge incident |
| XH117 | Blackburn Beverly | Sutton Wick air disaster |
| XH558 | Avro Vulcan B.2 | Avro Vulcan XH558 |
| XM645 | Avro Vulcan B.2 | 1975 Żabbar Avro Vulcan crash |
| XM655 | Avro Vulcan B.2 | Avro Vulcan XM655 |
| XV179 | Lockheed Hercules C1 | 2005 Royal Air Force Hercules shootdown |
| XV216 | Lockheed Hercules C1 | 1971 RAF Hercules crash |
| XV493 | McDonnell-Douglas Phantom FGR2 | 1974 Norfolk mid-air collision |
| XZ256 | Westland Lynx | HMS Richmond helicopter crash |
| ZA718 | Boeing Chinook | Bravo November |
| ZD576 | Boeing Chinook | 1994 Scotland RAF Chinook crash |
| ZZ336 | Royal Air Force Voyager KC3 (Airbus A330 MRTT) | Air transport of the British royal family and government |

=== United States ===
Including United States Coast Guard aircraft

| Tail number | Description | Related article |
| A5587 | Semi-rigid airship | O-1 (airship) |
| ZMC-2 | Metal-skinned airship | ZMC-2 |
| ZR-1 | Rigid airship | USS Shenandoah (ZR-1) |
| ZR-2 | Rigid airship | R38 class airship |
| ZR-3 | Rigid airship | USS Los Angeles (ZR-3) |
| ZRS-4 | Rigid airship | USS Akron (ZRS-4) |
| ZRS-5 | Rigid airship | USS Macon (ZRS-5) |
| 00-0001 | Boeing 747-400F | Boeing YAL-1 |
| 00-26860 | Sikorsky UH-60 Black Hawk | 2025 Potomac River mid-air collision |
| 1432 | Sikorsky HH-3F Pelican | CG-1432 Crash |
| 1705 | Lockheed C-130H Hercules | 2009 California mid-air collision |
| 11-9358 | Bombardier Global Express E-11A | Deh Yak airplane crash |
| 26000 | VC-137C SAM 26000 | Air Force One |
| 27000 | VC-137C SAM 27000 | Air Force One |
| 82-8000 (28000) | Boeing VC-25A | Air Force One; Air Force One photo op incident |
| 92-9000 (29000) | Boeing VC-25A | Air Force One |
| 17171 | Douglas C-117D | Sólheimasandur Plane Crash |
| 37396 | Lockheed PV-2 Harpoon | Lockheed PV-2 Harpoon No. 37396 |
| 39939 | Beech SNB-1 Kansan | Cubana de Aviación Flight 493 |
| 86180 | General Motors TBM-3E Avenger | General Motors TBM-3E Avenger No. 86180 |
| 131582 | Douglas R6D-1 Liftmaster | 1960 Rio de Janeiro air crash |
| 135749 | Lockheed EC-121M Warning Star | EC-121 shootdown incident |
| 146891 | Vought RF-8A Crusader | 1964 Machida F-8 crash |
| 151458 | McDonnell Douglas F-4B Phantom II | Hughes Airwest Flight 706 |
| 152711 | Sikorsky SH-3 Sea King | Helicopter 66 |
| 156511 | Lockheed EP-3E ARIES II | Hainan Island incident |
| 157344 | McDonnell Douglas RF-4B Phantom II | 1977 Yokohama F-4 crash |
| 159387 | Lockheed S-3 Viking | Navy One |
| 160390 | Grumman F-14A Tomcat | Kara Hultgreen |
| 162437 | McDonnell Douglas F/A-18 Hornet | 2007 Blue Angels South Carolina crash |
| 163045 | Northrop Grumman EA-6B Prowler | Cavalese cable car disaster (1998) |
| 164017 | McDonnell Douglas F/A-18D Hornet | 2008 San Diego F/A-18 crash |
| 165000 | Lockheed Martin KC-130T | 2017 United States Marine Corps KC-130 crash |
| 167811 | Airship | American Blimp MZ-3 |
| 23-1230 | Douglas World Cruiser | Chicago |
| 26-202 | Atlantic-Fokker C-2 | Bird of Paradise |
| 40-2072 | Boeing B-17C Flying Fortress | Bakers Creek air crash |
| 40-2367 | Consolidated B-24D Liberator | Atka B-24D Liberator |
| 40-3097 | Boeing B-17D Flying Fortress | The Swoose |
| 41-2446 | Boeing B-17E Flying Fortress | Swamp Ghost |
| 41-2666 | Boeing B-17E Flying Fortress | Old 666 |
| 41-7630 | Lockheed P-38F Lightning | Glacier Girl |
| 41-9032 | Boeing B-17E Flying Fortress | My Gal Sal |
| 41-11822 | Consolidated XB-41 Liberator | Consolidated XB-41 Liberator |
| 41-18496 | Douglas C-47 Skytrain (conversion) | Douglas XCG-17 |
| 41-23728 | Consolidated B-24 Liberator | Hot Stuff |
| 41-24027 | Consolidated C-87 Liberator Express | 1943 Liberator crash at Whenuapai |
| 41-24301 | Consolidated B-24D Liberator | Lady Be Good |
| 41-24485 | Boeing B-17F Flying Fortress | Memphis Belle |
| 41-24620 | Boeing B-17F Flying Fortress | Alan Eugene Magee |
| 41-30577 | North American B-25D Mitchell | B-25 Empire State Building crash |
| 41-37227 | Douglas C-54 Skymaster | TWA Flight 277 |
| 41-38116 | Lockheed RB-34 Lexington | American Airlines Flight 28 |
| 42-13400 | Lockheed P-38G Lightning | Temnac P-38G Lightning |
| 42-23952 | Douglas C-47A Skytrain | Gremlin Special |
| 42-24592 | Boeing B-29 Superfortress | Dauntless Dotty |
| 42-32076 | Boeing B-17G Flying Fortress | Shoo Shoo Baby |
| 42-32354 | North American B-25C Mitchell | King Nine Will Not Return |
| 42-50291 | Consolidated B-24H Liberator | Freckleton Air Disaster |
| 42-95095 | Consolidated B-24 Liberator | Fairy Lochs |
| 42-95592 | Consolidated B-24J Liberator | Black Cat |
| 43-38856 | Boeing B-17G Flying Fortress | USAAF Boeing B-17 crash on North Barrule |
| 44-15651 | North American P-51D Mustang | The Galloping Ghost |
| 44-27296 | Boeing B-29 Superfortress | Some Punkins |
| 44-27300 | Boeing B-29 Superfortress | Strange Cargo |
| 44-27303 | Boeing B-29 Superfortress | Jabit III |
| 44-27353 | Boeing B-29 Superfortress | The Great Artiste |
| 44-35553 | Douglas A-26C Invader | Eastern Airlines Flight 45 |
| 44-62070 | Boeing B-29 Superfortress | FIFI |
| 44-70155 | Hughes XF-11 | Howard Hughes (1946 Beverly Hills crash) |
| 44-73287 | North American P-51D Mustang | Worry Bird |
| 44-83575 | Boeing B-17G Flying Fortress | Nine-O-Nine; 2019 Boeing B-17 Flying Fortress crash |
| 44-83690 | Boeing B-17G Flying Fortress | B-17G "Flying Fortress" No. 44-83690 |
| 44-83872 | Boeing B-17G Flying Fortress | Texas Raiders |
| 44-85740 | Boeing B-17G Flying Fortress | Aluminum Overcast |
| 44-85784 | Boeing B-17G Flying Fortress | Sally B |
| 44-86292 | Boeing B-29 Superfortress | Enola Gay |
| 44-87651 | Boeing B-29 Superfortress | 1950 Fairfield-Suisun Boeing B-29 crash |
| 44-92075 | Consolidated B-36B Peacemaker | 1950 British Columbia B-36 crash |
| 45-21776 | Boeing B-29 Superfortress | Kee Bird |
| 45-21847 | Boeing F-13 Superfortress | 1948 Lake Mead Boeing B-29 crash |
| 45-21866 | Boeing B-29 Superfortress | 1948 Waycross B-29 crash |
| 45-48846 | Boeing B-17G Flying Fortress | The Pink Lady |
| 46-010 | Boeing B-50A Superfortress | Lucky Lady II |
| 48-0620 | Lockheed VC-121A Constellation | Columbine II |
| 49-0268 | Boeing B-50D Superfortress | Lester Apartments |
| 51-5853 | Northrop F-89C Scorpion | Felix Moncla |
| 51-2349 | Boeing B-47B Stratojet | 1958 Tybee Island B-47 crash |
| 52-0008 | Boeing B-52 Stratofortress | Balls 8 |
| 52-10108 | North American F-86L Sabre | 1958 Tybee Island B-47 crash |
| 53-0406 | Boeing B-52C Stratofortress | 1963 Elephant Mountain B-52 crash |
| 53-3222 | Fairchild C-119G Flying Boxcar | 1955 Altensteig mid-air collision |
| 53-7841 | Fairchild C-119G Flying Boxcar | 1955 Altensteig mid-air collision |
| 55-0060 | Boeing B-52D Stratofortress | 1964 Savage Mountain B-52 crash |
| 55-3633 | North American F-100 Super Sabre | 1959 Okinawa F-100 crash |
| 56-0687 | Boeing B-52D Stratofortress | B-52 Memorial Park |
| 56-0763 | Lockheed F-104 Starfighter | North American Eagle Project |
| 56-3755 | North American F-100F Super Sabre | United Airlines Flight 736 |
| 56-6676 | Lockheed U-2F | Rudolf Anderson |
| 56-6693 | Lockheed U-2C | 1960 U-2 incident |
| 57-0166 | Boeing B-52F Stratofortress | 1961 Yuba City B-52 crash |
| 58-0187 | Boeing B-52G Stratofortress | 1961 Goldsboro B-52 crash |
| 58-0188 | Boeing B-52G Stratofortress | 1968 Thule Air Base B-52 crash |
| 58-0256 | Boeing B-52G Stratofortress | 1966 Palomares B-52 crash |
| 60-0053 | Boeing B-52H Stratofortress | 2008 Guam B-52 crash |
| 60-0061 | Boeing B-52H Stratofortress | 2026 Edwards Air Force Base B-52 crash |
| 61-0026 | Boeing B-52G Stratofortress | 1994 Fairchild Air Force Base B-52 crash |
| 61-0273 | Boeing KC-135A Stratotanker | 1966 Palomares B-52 crash |
| 62-0001 | North American XB-70 Valkyrie | North American XB-70 Valkyrie |
| 62-1920 | Bell UH-1B Iroquois | 1974 White House helicopter incident |
| 62-4137 | RC-135E Rivet Amber | Rivet Amber crash |
| 62-4448 | North American CT-39A Sabreliner | 1964 T-39 shootdown incident |
| 62-6000 | Boeing VC-137C | VC-137C SAM 26000 |
| 63-7789 | Lockheed C-130 Hercules | 1969 theft of C-130 |
| 66-0173 | Lockheed C-141C Starlifter | Green Ramp Disaster |
| 66-0177 | Lockheed C-141C Starlifter | Hanoi Taxi |
| 68-0218 | Lockheed C-5A Galaxy | Tan Son Nhut C-5 accident |
| 68-10942 | Lockheed C-130E Hercules | Green Ramp Disaster |
| 69-6207 | Ling-Temco-Vought A-7D Corsair II | 1987 Ramada Inn Corsair crash |
| 72-7000 | Boeing VC-137C Stratoliner | VC-137C SAM 27000 |
| 73-1149 | Boeing T-43 Bobcat | 1996 Croatia USAF CT-43 crash |
| 77-0354 | Boeing E-3 Sentry | 1995 Alaska Boeing E-3 Sentry accident |
| 88-0171 | Lockheed Martin F-16D Fighting Falcon | Green Ramp Disaster |
| 89-0127 | Northrop Grumman B-2 Spirit | Andersen Air Force Base B-2 accident |
| 96-0085 | General Dynamics F-16C Fighting Falcon | 2015 Moncks Corner mid-air collision |

=== Venezuela ===
| Tail number | Description | Related article |
| EV 08114 | Mil Mi-35 | Táchira helicopter crash |

== Civil ==
=== Afghanistan ===
| Tail number | Description | Related article |
| YA-BAG | Douglas DC-4 | Ariana Afghan Airlines Flight 202 |
| YA-BAM | Antonov An-26 | 1985 Bakhtar Afghan Airlines Antonov An-26 shootdown |
| YA-FAR | Boeing 727-113C | Ariana Afghan Airlines Flight 701 |
| YA-FAZ | Boeing 727-228 | 1998 Ariana Afghan Airlines crash |
| YA-PIS | Antonov An-24 | Pamir Airways Flight 112 |

=== Algeria ===
| Tail number | Description | Related article |
| 7T-VEE | Boeing 737-2D6C | Air Algérie Flight 702P |
| 7T-VEZ | Boeing 737-200 | Air Algérie Flight 6289 |

=== Angola ===
| Tail number | Description | Related article |
| D2-TBN | Boeing 737-200 | 1983 TAAG Angola Airlines Boeing 737 crash |
| D2-TBP | Boeing 737-2M2 | 2007 TAAG Angola Airlines crash |

=== Antigua and Barbuda ===
| Tail number | Description | Related article |
| V2-LCJ | de Havilland Canada DHC-6 Series 310 Twin Otter | LIAT Flight 319 |

=== Argentina ===
| Tail number | Description | Related article |
| LQ-CGK | Eurocopter AS350B3 Ecureuil | Villa Castelli helicopter collision |
| LQ-FJQ | Eurocopter AS350B3 Ecureuil | Villa Castelli helicopter collision |
| LV-CEJ | Saab 340 | Sol Líneas Aéreas Flight 5428 |
| LV-HGW | Hawker Siddeley HS 748 | Aerolíneas Argentinas Flight 707 |
| LV-MLR | Boeing 747-287B | Aerolíneas Argentinas Flight 386 |
| LV-WEG | McDonnell Douglas DC-9-32 | Austral Líneas Aéreas Flight 2553 |
| LV-WRZ | Boeing 737-204C | Líneas Aéreas Privadas Argentinas Flight 3142 |

=== Armenia ===
| Tail number | Description | Related article |
| EK-32009 | Airbus A320-211 | Armavia Flight 967 |

=== Australia ===
| Tail number | Description | Related article |
| G-AUKA | Westland Widgeon | Kookaburra (aircraft) |
| G-AUNZ | Ryan Brougham | Moncrieff and Hood |
| VH-AAV | Beechcraft Super King Air | VH-AAV crash |
| VH-AET | Douglas DC-3 | 1946 Australian National Airways DC-3 crash |
| VH-ANA | Douglas DC-4 | 1950 Australian National Airways Douglas DC-4 crash |
| VH-ANK | Douglas DC-3 | 1948 Australian National Airways DC-3 crash |
| VH-BAG | Lockheed Lodestar | 1949 Queensland Airlines Lockheed Lodestar crash |
| VH-BPE | Douglas DC-6 | BCPA Flight 304 |
| VH-ENA | Beechcraft Baron | Connellan air disaster |
| VH-MME | Douglas DC-3 | 1949 MacRobertson Miller Aviation DC-3 crash |
| VH-NGA | IAI Westwind | 2009 Pel-Air Westwind ditching |
| VH-NOO | de Havilland Canada DHC-2 Beaver | 2017 Sydney Seaplanes crash |
| VH-OJA | Boeing 747-438 | City of Canberra (aircraft) |
| VH-OJH | Boeing 747-400 | Qantas Flight 1 |
| VH-OJK | Boeing 747-400 | Qantas Flight 30 |
| VH-OQA | Airbus A380-800 | Qantas Flight 32 |
| VH-QPA | Airbus A330-300 | Qantas Flight 72 |
| VH-RMI | Vickers Viscount | Ansett-ANA Flight 149 |
| VH-RMQ | Vickers Viscount | MacRobertson Miller Airlines Flight 1750 |
| VH-SKC | Beechcraft Super King Air | 2000 Australia Beechcraft King Air crash |
| VH-TFB | Fokker Friendship | Trans Australia Airlines Flight 538 |
| VH-TFU | Fairchild Swearingen Metroliner | Lockhart River air disaster |
| VH-TLB | Lockheed Electra | Trans Australia Airlines Flight 408 |
| VH-TVC | Vickers Viscount | Ansett-ANA Flight 325 |
| VH-UHH | Stinson Model A | 1937 Australian National Airways Stinson Crash |
| VH-UMF | Avro 618 Ten | Southern Cloud |
| VH-USB | Lockheed Altair | Lady Southern Cross |
| VH-USU | Fokker F.VIIb/3m | Southern Cross (aircraft) |
| VH-UYC | Douglas DC-2 | 1938 Kyeema Crash |
| VH-UYY | Stinson Model A | 1945 Australian National Airways Stinson crash |
| VH-100 | Cameron hot air balloon | The Skywhale |

=== Austria ===
| Tail number | Description | Related article |
| OE-LAV | Boeing 767-3Z9ER | Lauda Air Flight 004 |

=== Azerbaijan ===
| Tail number | Description | Related article |
| 4K-65703 | Tupolev Tu-134B | Azerbaijan Airlines Flight 56 |
| 4K-AZ25 | Antonov An-12 | 2016 Silk Way Airlines Antonov An-12 crash |
| 4K-AZ48 | Antonov An-140-100 | Azerbaijan Airlines Flight 217 |
| 4K-AZ65 | Embraer 190AR | Azerbaijan Airlines Flight 8243 |
| 4K-GUP | Canadair CL-44-O | Conroy Skymonster |

=== Bahrain ===
| Tail number | Description | Related article |
| A9C-DHL | Boeing 757-23APF | DHL Flight 611 |

=== Bangladesh ===
| Tail number | Description | Related article |
| S2-ABJ | Fokker F27 Friendship | 1984 Biman Bangladesh Airlines Fokker F27 crash |
| S2-AGU | Bombardier Dash 8 | US Bangla Airlines Flight 211 |
| S2-AGQ | Bombardier Dash 8 | Biman Bangladesh Airlines Flight 60 |
| S2-AGZ | Antonov An-26 | True Aviation Flight 21 |

=== Belarus ===
| Tail number | Description | Related article |
| EW-46465 | Antonov An-24RV | Lionair Flight 602 |
| EW-78849 | Ilyushin Il-76TD | 2007 Mogadishu TransAVIAexport Airlines Il-76 crash |

=== Belgium ===
| Tail number | Description | Related article |
| O-BLAN | Farman F.60 Goliath | 1921 SNETA Farman Goliath ditching |
| OO-AGN | Savoia-Marchetti S.73 | 1935 SABENA Savoia-Marchetti S.73 crash |
| OO-AUB | Junkers Ju 52/3m | Sabena OO-AUB Ostend crash |
| OO-DLL | Airbus A300B4-203F | 2003 Baghdad DHL attempted shootdown incident |
| OO-SJB | Boeing 707-329 | Sabena Flight 548 |
| OO-SJG | Boeing 707-329 | Sabena Flight 571 |

=== Bermuda ===
| Tail number | Description | Related article |
| VP-BKO | Boeing 737-500 | Aeroflot Flight 821 |
| VP-MON | Britten-Norman BN-2 Islander | FlyMontserrat Flight 107 |
| VP-BYZ | ATR-72 | UTair Flight 120 |
| VQ-BBN | Boeing 737-500 | Tatarstan Airlines Flight 363 |
| VQ-BJI | Boeing 737-8AS | Utair Flight 579 |
| VQ-BOZ | Airbus A321 | Ural Airlines Flight 178 |

=== Bolivia ===
| Tail number | Description | Related article |
| CP-609 | Douglas DC-4 | 1960 Lloyd Aéreo Boliviano DC-4 crash |
| CP-698 | Douglas DC-6 | 1969 The Strongest air disaster |
| CP-2429 | Boeing 727-259 Advanced | Lloyd Aéreo Boliviano Flight 301 |
| CP-2548 | Swearingen SA-227BC Metroliner III | Aerocon Flight 238 |
| CP-2754 | Swearingen SA-227AC Metroliner III | Aerocon Flight 25 |
| CP-2933 | Avro RJ85 | LaMia Airlines Flight 2933 |

=== Brazil ===
| Tail number | Description | Related article |
| BR-MEA3 | Golfier Baloons G-32-13000 | 2025 Santa Catarina hot air balloon crash |
| PP-ANH | Douglas C-47 | 1952 Transportes Aéreos Nacional Douglas C-47 mid-air explosion |
| PP-AXD | Douglas DC-3 | 1960 Rio de Janeiro air crash |
| PP-PEA | Douglas DC-8 | Varig Airlines Flight 837 |
| PP-SBC | Embraer EMB 110 Bandeirante | 1984 Transportes Aéreos Regionais Bandeirante accident |
| PP-VJK | Boeing 707-379C | Varig Flight 797 |
| PP-VJZ | Boeing 707-379C | Varig Flight 820 |
| PP-VMK | Boeing 737-241 | Varig Flight 254 |
| PR-GTD | Boeing 737-8EH SFP | Gol Transportes Aéreos Flight 1907 |
| PR-MBK | Airbus A320-233 | TAM Airlines Flight 3054 |
| PR-NOB | Let L-410 Turbolet | Noar Linhas Aéreas Flight 4896 |
| PS-VPB | ATR 72-500 | Voepass Linhas Aéreas Flight 2283 |
| PT-HPG | Bell 206B | 2019 São Paulo Bell 206B accident |
| PT-LYG | Beechcraft Baron | 2021 Palmas FR plane crash |
| PT-SEA | Embraer EMB-110P1 Bandeirante | 2009 Manaus Aerotáxi crash |

=== Bulgaria ===
| Tail number | Description | Related article |
| LZ-BEN | Ilyushin Il-18B | TABSO Flight 101 |
| LZ-BTN | Tupolev Tu-154 | 1977 Benghazi Libyan Arab Airlines Tu-154 crash |

=== Canada ===
| Tail number | Description | Related article |
| CF-BMB | Gregor FDB-1 | Canadian Car and Foundry FDB-1 |
| CF-CPC | Douglas DC-4 | 1951 Canadian Pacific Air Lines Douglas DC-4 disappearance |
| CF-CPK | Douglas DC-8-43 | Canadian Pacific Air Lines Flight 402 |
| CF-CUA | Douglas DC-3 | Albert Guay |
| CF-CUQ | Douglas DC-6B | Canadian Pacific Air Lines Flight 21 |
| CF-CZB | Bristol Britannia 314 | Canadian Pacific Air Lines Flight 301 |
| CF-EDN | Douglas C-54 Skymaster | 1950 Tête de l'Obiou C-54 crash |
| C-FKCK | Airbus A320-211 | Air Canada Flight 759 |
| C-FKFY | Convair CV-580 Airtanker | Conair Aviation Flight 448 |
| C-FNAA | British Aerospace Jetstream | Northwestern Air Flight 738 |
| C-FONF | Fokker F28-1000 | Air Ontario Flight 1363 |
| C-FPWC | Boeing 737 | Pacific Western Airlines Flight 314 |
| C-FQWL | Fairchild F-27 | Quebecair Flight 255 |
| C-FSKI | Canadair CL-600-2B19 (RJ100ER) Regional Jet | Air Canada Flight 646 |
| C-FTCZ | Boeing 737-800 | CanJet Flight 918 |
| CF-TFD | Canadair North Star | Trans-Canada Air Lines Flight 810 |
| CF-TFW | Canadair North Star | Trans-Canada Air Lines Flight 9 |
| CF-TGR | Vickers Viscount | 1956 Trans-Canada Air Lines accident |
| CF-TIW | McDonnell Douglas DC-8-63 | Air Canada Flight 621 |
| CF-TJN | Douglas DC-8 | Trans-Canada Air Lines Flight 831 |
| C-FTJP | Airbus A320 | Air Canada Flight 624 |
| C-FTLU | McDonnell Douglas DC-9-32 | Air Canada Flight 797 |
| C-FTLV | McDonnell Douglas DC-9-32 | Air Canada Flight 189 |
| C-GAUN | Boeing 767-233 | Gimli Glider |
| C-GITS | Airbus A330-243 | Air Transat Flight 236 |
| C-GMXQ | Douglas DC-8-61 | Nigeria Airways Flight 2120 |
| C-GNJZ | Bombardier CRJ-900LR | Air Canada Flight 8646 |
| C-GNWN | Boeing 737-200 | First Air Flight 6560 |
| C-GPAT | Airbus A310-308 | Air Transat Flight 961 |
| C-GPTR | Ornithopter | UTIAS Ornithopter No.1 |
| C-GWEA | ATR 42-320 | West Wind Aviation Flight 280 |
| C-GZCH | Sikorsky S-92A | Cougar Helicopters Flight 91 |

=== Cambodia ===
| Tail number | Description | Related article |
| XU-U4A | Antonov An-24B | PMTair Flight 241 |

=== Cameroon ===
| Tail number | Description | Related article |
| TJ-CBE | Boeing 737-200 | Cameroon Airlines Flight 3701 |

=== Chile ===
| Tail number | Description | Related article |
| CC-BGG | Boeing 787-900 | LATAM Airlines Flight 800 |
| CC-CAQ | Boeing 727 | LAN Chile Flight 160 |
| CC-CLD-P210 | Douglas DC-3 | LAN Chile Flight 210 |

=== China ===
(People's Republic of China)

| Tail number | Description | Related article |
| B-222 | Ilyushin Il-18 | China Southwest Airlines Flight 4146 |
| B-264 | Hawker Siddeley Trident | 1983 Guilin Airport collision |
| B-266 | Hawker Siddeley Trident | CAAC Flight 3303 |
| B-1791 | Boeing 737=89P | China Eastern Airlines Flight 5735 |
| B-2103 | McDonnell Douglas MD-82 | China Eastern Airlines Flight 5398 |
| B-2138 | McDonnell Douglas MD-82 | China Northern Airlines Flight 6136 |
| B-2141 | McDonnell Douglas MD-82 | China Northern Airlines Flight 6901 |
| B-2171 | McDonnell Douglas MD-11 | China Eastern Airlines Flight 583 |
| B-2402 | Boeing 707-3J6B | 1990 Guangzhou Baiyun airport collisions |
| B-2510 | Boeing 737-25C | 1990 Guangzhou Baiyun airport collisions |
| B-2552 | Boeing 767-2J6 | Air China Flight 129 |
| B-2610 | Tupolev Tu-154M | China Northwest Airlines Flight 2303 |
| B-2622 | Tupolev Tu-154M | China Southwest Airlines Flight 4509 |
| B-2716 | BAe 146 | China Northwest Airlines Flight 2119 |
| B-2755 | Yakovlev Yak-42 | China General Aviation Flight 7552 |
| B-2812 | Boeing 757-21B | 1990 Guangzhou Baiyun airport collisions |
| B-2925 | Boeing 737-31B | China Southern Airlines Flight 3456 |
| B-3072 | Bombardier CRJ 200LR | China Eastern Airlines Flight 5210 |
| B-3130 | Embraer E-190 | Henan Airlines Flight 8387 |
| B-3171 | Embraer E-190 | Tianjin Airlines Flight 7554 |
| B-3479 | Xian Y-7 | Wuhan Airlines Flight 343 |

=== Colombia ===
| Tail number | Description | Related article |
| HK-177 | Lockheed L-1049E Super Constellation | Avianca Flight 671 |
| HK-654 | Douglas C-54 Skymaster | Avianca Flight 03 |
| HK-1083 | Boeing 727 | Avianca Flight 203 |
| HK-1716 | Boeing 727-21 | Avianca Flight 410 |
| HK-2016 | Boeing 707-321B | Avianca Flight 052 |
| HK-2422X | Boeing 727 | SAM Colombia Flight 505 |
| HK-2494 | Douglas DC-3 | 2019 Colombia DC-3 crash |
| HK-2910 | Boeing 747-283B | Avianca Flight 011 |
| HK-4374X | McDonnell Douglas MD-82 | West Caribbean Airways Flight 708 |
| HK-4682 | Boeing 737-73V | AIRES Flight 8250 |

=== Congo, Democratic Republic of ===
| Tail number | Description | Related article |
| 9Q-CCN | Let L-410 Turbolet | 2010 Bandundu Filair Let L-410 crash |
| 9Q-CEN | Let L-410 Turbolet | 2007 Free Airlines L-410 crash |
| 9Q-CHN | McDonnell Douglas DC-9-51 | Hewa Bora Airways Flight 122 |
| 9Q-COP | Boeing 727 | Hewa Bora Airways Flight 952 |
| 9Q-COS | Antonov An-26 | 2007 Africa One Antonov An-26 crash |
| 9Q-CRR | Lockheed L-188 Electra | Trans Service Airlift Lockheed L-188 crash |
| 9Q-CSG | Boeing 727 | 1998 Lignes Aériennes Congolaises crash |

=== Congo, Republic of the ===
| Tail number | Description | Related article |
| TN-AFA | CASA C-212 Aviocar | 2010 Cameroon Aero Service CASA C-212 Aviocar crash |
| TN-AGK | Antonov An-12 | 2011 Pointe-Noire Trans Air Congo An-12 crash |
| TN-AIA | Antonov An-12BK | 2009 Aéro-Frêt Antonov An-12 crash |

=== Cuba ===
| Tail number | Description | Related article |
| CU-T188 | Douglas DC-4 | Cubana de Aviación Flight 493 |
| CU-T1285 | Yakovlev Yak-42 | Cubana de Aviación Flight 310 |
| CU-T1359 | ATR 72-212 | Aero Caribbean Flight 883 |

=== Cyprus ===
| Tail number | Description | Related article |
| 5B-DBY | Boeing 737-300 | Helios Airways Flight 522 |

=== Czechoslovakia / Czech Republic ===
| Tail number | Description | Related article |
| OK-GLI | Buran shuttle | OK-GLI |
| OK-NAB | Ilyushin Il-18B | ČSA Flight 001 |
| OK-TAO | Tatra T.101 | Tatra T.101 |
| OK-WDB | Douglas C-47 Skytrain | 1947 Croydon Dakota accident |
| OK-ZRB | Zlin Z 526 | 2013 Eberswalde-Finow Zlin crash |

=== Denmark ===
| Tail number | Description | Related article |
| OY-CRG | British Aerospace 146 | Atlantic Airways Flight 670 |
| OY-DIZ | SAI KZ IV | SAI KZ IV |
| OY-DZU | SAI KZ IV | SAI KZ IV |
| OY-GDC | Embraer E195 | Air Serbia Flight 324 |
| OY-KAA | Airbus A300 | Malaysian Airline System Flight 684 |
| OY-KHO | McDonnell Douglas MD-81 | Scandinavian Airlines Flight 751 |
| OY-KRB | Sud Aviation Caravelle | Scandinavian Airlines System Flight 871 |
| OY-STL | Sud Aviation Caravelle | Sterling Airways Flight 296 |

=== Dominican Republic ===
| Tail number | Description | Related article |
| HI-177 | McDonnell Douglas DC-9 | Dominicana DC-9 air disaster |

=== Ecuador ===
| Tail number | Description | Related article |
| HC-BIG | Boeing 737-200 | TAME 737-200 crash |
| HC-BLF | Boeing 727-124 | TAME Flight 120 |
| HC-BSU | Boeing 727 | Air France Flight 422 |

=== Equatorial Guinea ===
| Tail number | Description | Related article |
| 3C-VQR | Antonov An-24 | 2005 Equatorial Express Airlines Antonov 24 crash |

=== Egypt ===
| Tail number | Description | Related article |
| SU-AHH | SNCASE Languedoc | 1951 Misrair SNCASE Languedoc crash |
| SU-ALD | De Havilland DH.106 Comet 4C | United Arab Airlines Flight 869 (1963) |
| SU-AMW | De Havilland DH.106 Comet 4C | United Arab Airlines Flight 869 (1962) |
| SU-AOV | Ilyushin Il-18D | 1973 EgyptAir Ilyushin Il-18 crash |
| SU-AXA | Boeing 707-336C | EgyptAir Flight 864 |
| SU-AYH | Boeing 737-200 | EgyptAir Flight 648 |
| SU-GAP | Boeing 767-366ER | EgyptAir Flight 990 |
| SU-GBI | Boeing 737-500 | EgyptAir Flight 843 |
| SU-GCB | Airbus A320-200 | EgyptAir Flight 181 |
| SU-GCC | Airbus A320-200 | EgyptAir Flight 804 |
| SU-ZCF | Boeing 737-3Q8 | Flash Airlines Flight 604 |
| SU-283 | Ultra-Magic N-45 Balloon | 2013 Luxor hot air balloon crash |

=== Ethiopia ===
| Tail number | Description | Related article |
| ET-AIZ | Boeing 767-260ER | Ethiopian Airlines Flight 961 |
| ET-AJA | Boeing 737-260 | Ethiopian Airlines Flight 604 |
| ET-AMF | Boeing 767-3BGER | Ethiopian Airlines ET702 hijacking |
| ET-ANB | Boeing 737-8BK | Ethiopian Airlines Flight 409 |
| ET-AVJ | Boeing 737 MAX 8 | Ethiopian Airlines Flight 302 |
| ET-T-18 | Douglas DC-3 | Ethiopian Airlines Flight 372 |

=== France ===
| Tail number | Description | Related article |
| F-AEBY | Farman F.60 Goliath | May 1923 Air Union Farman Goliath crash |
| F-AECB | Farman F.60 Goliath | August 1923 Air Union Farman Goliath crash |
| F-AICQ | Blériot 155 | October 1926 Air Union Blériot 155 crash |
| F-AIEB | Blériot 155 | August 1926 Air Union Blériot 155 crash |
| F-AKGB | Loire 301 | Loire 30 |
| F-AMHP | Wibault 282-T | 1934 Air France Wibault 282T crash |
| F-BAZN | Lockheed L-749A-79-46 Constellation | 1949 Air France Lockheed Constellation crash |
| F-BAZS | Lockheed L-749A-79-46 Constellation | Air France Flight 152 |
| F-BBDE | Douglas DC-4 | 1950 Air France multiple Douglas DC-4 accidents |
| F-BBDM | Douglas DC-4 | 1950 Air France multiple Douglas DC-4 accidents |
| F-BCUM | SNCASE Languedoc | 1952 Air France SNCASE Languedoc crash |
| F-BDRC | Latécoère 631 | Air France Latécoère 631 crash |
| F-BHSM | Boeing 707-300 | Air France Flight 007 |
| F-BHST | Boeing 707-300 | Air France Flight 117 |
| F-BLKB | Moynet Jupiter | Moynet Jupiter |
| F-BOHB | Sud Aviation SE-210 Caravelle III | Air France Flight 1611 |
| F-BTSC | Aérospatiale-BAC Concorde | Air France Flight 4590 |
| F-BVGG | Airbus A300B4-203 | Operation Entebbe |
| F-FHMY | Farman F.63 Goliath | 1930 Air Union Farman Goliath crash |
| F-GBEC | Airbus A300B2-1C | Air France Flight 8969 |
| F-GEAD | Farman F.60 | First mid-air collision of airliners |
| F-GFKC | Airbus A320-111 | Air France Flight 296 |
| F-GGED | Airbus A320-111 | Air Inter Flight 148 |
| F-GLZQ | Airbus A340-313 | Air France Flight 358 |
| F-GTDI | McDonnell Douglas DC-10 | Cubana de Aviación Flight 1216 |
| F-GZCP | Airbus A330-203 | Air France Flight 447 |
| F-HPJE | Airbus A380-861 | Air France Flight 66 |
| F-OGQS | Airbus A310-304 | Aeroflot Flight 593 |
| F-OGYP | Airbus A310-324 | S7 Airlines Flight 778 |
| F-OHRK | Beechcraft 1900 | 1995 Air St. Martin Beech 1900 crash |
| F-OIQI | de Havilland Canada DHC-6 Twin Otter | Air Moorea Flight 1121 |
| F-WEPI | SNCASE SE-1210 | SNCASE SE-1210 |
| F-WILE | Airbus E-Fan | Airbus E-Fan |
| F-WLKE | Moynet Jupiter | Moynet Jupiter |
| F-WLKY | Moynet Jupiter | Moynet Jupiter |
| F-WWKH | Airbus A330-300 | 1994 A330 test flight crash |

=== Finland ===
| Tail number | Description | Related article |
| OH-ALL | Junkers Ju 52 | Kaleva (airplane) |
| OH-HCI | Sikorsky S-76 | Copterline Flight 103 |
| OH-LCA | Douglas DC-3 | Aero Flight 217 |
| OH-LCC | Douglas DC-3 | Aero Flight 311 |

=== Germany ===
| Tail number | Description | Related article |
| D-AHLB | Airbus A310-304 | Hapag-Lloyd Flight 3378 |
| D-AIPN | Airbus A320-211 | Lufthansa Flight 2904 |
| D-AIPX | Airbus A320-211 | Germanwings Flight 9525 |
| D-ALCQ | McDonnell Douglas MD-11 | Lufthansa Cargo flight 8460 |
| D-AVMF | Junkers Ju 90A1 | 1940 Deutsche Lufthansa Ju 90 crash |
| D-AXLA | Airbus A320 | XL Airways Germany Flight 888T |
| D-BEAT | Bombardier DHC-8 | Lufthansa Cityline Flight 5634 |
| D-CGFI | Learjet 35A | 2014 Olsberg mid-air collision |
| D-CXXX | Douglas DC-3 | 2010 Berlin Air Services DC-3 crash |
| D-IEVX | Cessna Citation II | 2001 Linate Airport runway collision |
| D-IGIR | Rhein-Flugzeugbau RF-1 | Rhein-Flugzeugbau RF-1 |
| D-IGVN | Dornier 228 | Polar 3 |
| D-LZ 127 | Airship | LZ 127 Graf Zeppelin |
| D-LZ 129 | Hindenburg-class airship | Hindenburg disaster |
| D-LZ 130 | Airship | LZ 130 Graf Zeppelin II |
| LZ-10 | Rigid airship | LZ 10 Schwaben |
| D-903 | Junkers G 31 | 1929 Luft Hansa Junkers G 31 crash |
| D-1167 | Junkers W33 | Bremen |

==== East Germany ====
| Tail number | Description | Related article |
| DM-SEA | Ilyushin Il-62 | 1972 Königs Wusterhausen air disaster |
| DM-ZYA | Baade 152 | Baade 152 |

==== West Germany ====
| Tail number | Description | Related article |
| D-ABCE | Boeing 737-230/Adv | Lufthansa Flight 181 |
| D-ABYB | Boeing 747-130 | Lufthansa Flight 540 |
| D-ACAT | Convair CV-440 Metropolitan | Lufthansa Flight 005 |
| D-ALAK | Lockheed L-1049 Super Constellation | Lufthansa Flight 502 |
| D-ALAR | BAC One-Eleven | Paninternational Flight 112 |
| D-ECJB | Cessna 172 | Mathias Rust |

=== Georgia ===
| Tail number | Description | Related article |
| 4L-GAE | Bombardier CRJ-100ER | 2011 United Nations Bombardier CRJ-100 crash |
| 4L-GNI | Ilyushin Il-76 | Sun Way Flight 4412 |

=== Ghana ===
| Tail number | Description | Related article |
| 9G-MKJ | Boeing 747-200F | MK Airlines Flight 1602 |

=== Greece ===
| Tail number | Description | Related article |
| SX-BHS | Airbus A321-100 | Daallo Airlines Flight 159 |
| SX-ECH | Dassault Falcon 900B | Olympic Airways Flight 3838 |

=== Guatemala ===
| Tail number | Description | Related article |
| TG-ACA | Convair 240 | 1977 Aviateca Convair 240 crash |
| TG-JGS | Cessna Caravan 208 | 2008 Aéreo Ruta Maya crash |

=== Honduras ===
| Tail number | Description | Related article |
| HR-AUQ | Let L-410 Turbolet | Central American Airways Flight 731 |

=== Hong Kong ===
| Tail number | Description | Related article |
| B-HLL | Airbus A330-342 | Cathay Pacific Flight 780 |
| VR-HDT | Consolidated PBY Catalina | Miss Macao |
| VR-HEU | Douglas DC-4 | 1954 Cathay Pacific Douglas DC-4 shootdown |
| VR-HFZ | Convair CV-880-22M-21 | Cathay Pacific Flight 700Z |

=== Hungary ===
| Tail number | Description | Related article |
| HA-LCI | Tupolev Tu-154 B | Malév Flight 240 |
| HA-LCR | Tupolev Tu-154 B-2 | Malév Flight 262 |

=== Iceland ===
| Tail number | Description | Related article |
| TF-ARO | Boeing 747-243B | 2004 Summer Olympics torch relay |
| TF-FLA | Douglas DC-8 | Icelandic Airlines Flight LL 001 |

=== India ===
| Tail number | Description | Related article |
| VT-ANB | Boeing 787 Dreamliner | Air India Flight 171 |
| VT-APG | Bell 430 | 2009 Andhra Pradesh helicopter crash |
| VT-AXH | Boeing 737-8NG(SFP) | Air India Express Flight 1344 |
| VT-AXV | Boeing 737-8HG | Air India Express Flight 812 |
| VT-CQP | Lockheed L-749A Constellation | Air India Flight 245 |
| VT-DEP | Lockheed L-749A Constellation | Kashmir Princess |
| VT-DJJ | Boeing 707-420 | Air India Flight 403 |
| VT-DMN | Boeing 707-437 | Air India Flight 101 |
| VT-EAH | Boeing 737-2A8 | Indian Airlines Flight 113 |
| VT-EBD | Boeing 747-237B | Air India Flight 855 |
| VT-ECQ | Boeing 737-2A8 | Indian Airlines Flight 491 |
| VT-EDW | Airbus A300 | Indian Airlines Flight 814 |
| VT-EFL | Boeing 737-2A8 | Indian Airlines Flight 257 |
| VT-EFO | Boeing 747-237B | Air India Flight 182 |
| VT-EGD | Boeing 737-2A8 | Alliance Air Flight 7412 |
| VT-EPN | Airbus A320-231 | Indian Airlines Flight 605 |

=== Indonesia ===
| Tail number | Description | Related article |
| PK-AFV | Douglas DC-3 | 1942 KNILM Douglas DC-3 shootdown |
| PK-AXC | Airbus A320-200 | Indonesia AirAsia Flight 8501 |
| PK-CLC | Boeing 737-500 | Sriwijaya Air Flight 182 |
| PK-GAI | Airbus A300 | Garuda Indonesia Flight 152 |
| PK-GKU | Fokker F28 Fellowship | Merpati Nusantara Airlines Flight 422 |
| PK-GLB | Lockheed L-188A Electra | Garuda Indonesia Airways Flight 708 |
| PK-GNJ | McDonnell Douglas DC-9 | Garuda Indonesia Flight 206 |
| PK-GNQ | McDonnell Douglas DC-9-32 | Garuda Indonesia Flight 035 |
| PK-GVC | Fokker F28 Fellowship | Garuda Indonesia Flight 150 |
| PK-GVK | Fokker F28 Fellowship | 1982 Garuda Fokker F28 crash |
| PK-GWA | Boeing 737-3Q8 | Garuda Indonesia Flight 421 |
| PK-GZC | Boeing 737-497 | Garuda Indonesia Flight 200 |
| PK-KKV | Boeing 737-33A | Adam Air Flight 172 |
| PK-KKW | Boeing 737-400 | Adam Air Flight 574 |
| PK-LBS | Boeing 737-8GP | Batik Air Flight 7703 |
| PK-LID | Boeing 737-200 | Lion Air Flight 386 |
| PK-LMN | McDonnell Douglas MD-82 | Lion Air Flight 583 |
| PK-LQP | Boeing 737 MAX 8 | Lion Air Flight 610 |
| PK-LTJ | Pilatus PC-6 | Mimika Air Flight 514 |
| PK-MDE | Boeing 737-300 | Merpati Nusantara Airlines Flight 836 |
| PK-MVS | Vickers Viscount | 1971 Indian Ocean Vickers Viscount crash |
| PK-MZK | Xian MA60 | Merpati Nusantara Airlines Flight 8968 |
| PK-NVC | DHC-6 Twin Otter 300 | Merpati Nusantara Airlines Flight 9760 |
| PK-RIM | Boeing 737-200 | Mandala Airlines Flight 091 |
| PK-RVU | Vickers Viscount | Mandala Airlines Flight 660 |
| PK-THT | ATR-42 | 2026 Indonesia Air Transport ATR 42 crash |
| PK-TNJ | ATR 42-600 | Batik Air Flight 7703 |
| PK-YRN | ATR-42 | Trigana Air Service Flight 267 |

=== Iran ===
| Tail number | Description | Related article |
| EP-ATS | ATR 72-200 | Iran Aseman Airlines Flight 3704 |
| EP-CPG | Tupolev Tu-154M | Caspian Airlines Flight 7908 |
| EP-CPP | Boeing 707-3J9C | 2019 Saha Airlines Boeing 707 crash |
| EP-CPZ | McDonnell Douglas MD-83 | Caspian Airlines Flight 6936 |
| EP-GPA | HESA IrAn-140 | Sepahan Airlines Flight 5915 |
| EP-IBU | Airbus A300B2-203 | Iran Air Flight 655 |
| EP-IRD | Boeing 727-86 | Iran Air Flight 291 |
| EP-IRP | Boeing 727-286 | Iran Air Flight 277 |
| EP-ITD | Tupolev Tu-154M | 1993 Tehran mid-air collision |
| EP-LCA | Fokker 27 Mk.050 | Kish Air Flight 7170 |
| EP-MCF | Tupolev Tu-154M | 2006 Iran Air Tours crash |
| EP-PAV | Fokker F28-1000 | Iran Aseman Airlines Flight 746 |

=== Iraq ===
| Tail number | Description | Related article |
| YI-AGJ | Boeing 737-270C | Iraqi Airways Flight 163 |

=== Ireland ===
| Tail number | Description | Related article |
| EI-AOM | Vickers Viscount | Aer Lingus Flight 712 |
| EI-BND | Canadair CL-44-O | Conroy Skymonster |
| EI-BWF | Boeing 747-283B | Philippine Airlines Flight 434 |
| EI-BZG | Boeing 737-300 | Philippine Airlines Flight 143 |
| EI-DRA | Boeing 737-852 | Aeroméxico Flight 576 |
| EI-DYG | Boeing 737-8AS | Ryanair Flight 4102 |
| EI-ETJ | Airbus A321-231 | Metrojet Flight 9268 |
| EI-ORD | Airbus A330-300 | 2005 Logan Airport runway incursion |
| EI-TAF | Airbus A320-233 | TACA Flight 390 |

=== Israel ===
| Tail number | Description | Related article |
| 4X-AKC | Lockheed L-049 Constellation | El Al Flight 402 |
| 4X-ATB | Boeing 707-358 | El Al Flight 219 |
| 4X-AXG | Boeing 747-258F | El Al Flight 1862 |
| 4X-BAW | Boeing 757-3E7 | Arkia Israel Airlines Flight 582 |

=== Italy ===
| Tail number | Description | Related article |
| I-ATJA | McDonnell Douglas DC-9-32 | Alitalia Flight 404 |
| I-BAUQ | Savoia-Marchetti S.55 | Savoia-Marchetti S.55 |
| I-DIKQ | McDonnell Douglas DC-9-32 | Alitalia Flight 4128 |
| I-DIWB | Douglas DC-8-43 | Alitalia Flight 112 |
| I-DIWD | Douglas DC-8-43 | Alitalia Flight 771 |
| I-DIKQ | McDonnell Douglas DC-9-32 | Alitalia Flight 4128 |
| I-ELCE | Fiat G.212CP | Superga air disaster |
| I-SAAN | N-class semi-rigid airship | Norge (airship) |
| I-TIGI | McDonnell Douglas DC-9-15 | Itavia Flight 870 |

=== Japan ===
| Tail number | Description | Related article |
| JA13XJ | Airbus A350-941 | Japan Airlines Flight 516 |
| JA722A | de Havilland Canada Dash 8-315 | Japan Airlines Flight 516 |
| JA8013 | Douglas DC-8-53 | Japan Airlines Flight 472 (1972) |
| JA8032 | Douglas DC-8 | Japan Air Lines Flight 2 |
| JA8033 | Douglas DC-8 | Japan Air Lines Flight 472 |
| JA8040 | Douglas DC-8-62 | Japan Air Lines Flight 446 |
| JA8051 | McDonnell Douglas DC-8 | Japan Air Lines Flight 715 |
| JA8061 | McDonnell Douglas DC-8-61 | Japan Air Lines Flight 350 |
| JA8119 | Boeing 747-SR46 | Japan Air Lines Flight 123 |
| JA8302 | Boeing 727-81 | All Nippon Airways Flight 60 |
| JA8329 | Boeing 727-281 | All Nippon Airways Flight 58 |
| JA8444 | Boeing 737-200 | Southwest Air Lines Flight 611 |
| JA8546 | Douglas DC-10-40D | 2001 Japan Airlines mid-air incident |
| JA8658 | NAMC YS-11-111 | All Nippon Airways Flight 533 |
| JA8764 | NAMC YS-11A-217 | Toa Domestic Airlines Flight 533 |
| JA8904 | Boeing 747-446D | 2001 Japan Airlines mid-air incident |
| JA8966 | Boeing 747-481D | All Nippon Airways Flight 61 |

=== Jordan ===
| Tail number | Description | Related article |
| JY-ADO | Boeing 707-3D3C | Kano air disaster |
| JY-AEE | Boeing 707-321C | Agadir air disaster |

=== Kazakhstan ===
| Tail number | Description | Related article |
| UN-76435 | Ilyushin Il-76TD | 1996 Charkhi Dadri mid-air collision |
| UP-AN216 | Antonov An-12BP | 2010 Interisland Airlines Antonov An-12 crash |
| UP-F1007 | Fokker 100 | Bek Air Flight 2100 |
| UP-I6208 | Ilyushin Il-62M | Aria Air Flight 1525 |
| UR-CJ006 | Bombardier CRJ-200 | SCAT Airlines Flight 760 |

=== Kenya ===
| Tail number | Description | Related article |
| 5Y-BEN | Airbus A310-304 | Kenya Airways Flight 431 |
| 5Y-HAJ | Hawker Siddeley HS 748 | 2014 748 Air Services HS 748 crash |
| 5Y-JLD | Canadair CRJ-100 | RwandAir Flight 205 |
| 5Y-KYA | Boeing 737-8AL | Kenya Airways Flight 507 |
| 5Y-NNJ | Cessna 172M | 2024 Nairobi mid-air collision |
| 5Y-SLK | De Havilland Canada DHC-8-315 | 2024 Nairobi mid-air collision |

=== Kyrgyzstan ===
| Tail number | Description | Related article |
| EX-009 | Boeing 737-219 Advanced | Iran Aseman Airlines Flight 6895 |
| EX-037 | Boeing 737-200 | Kam Air Flight 904 |
| EX-37005 | Boeing 737-300 | Avia Traffic Company Flight 768 |

=== Laos ===
| Tail number | Description | Related article |
| RDPL-34322 | ATR 72-600 | Lao Airlines Flight 301 |

=== Lebanon ===
| Tail number | Description | Related article |
| OD-AFT | Boeing 720 | Middle East Airlines Flight 438 |

=== Libya ===
| Tail number | Description | Related article |
| 5A-DAH | Boeing 727-224 | Libyan Arab Airlines Flight 114 |
| 5A-DIA | Boeing 727-2L5 | Libyan Arab Airlines Flight 1103 |
| 5A-ONB | Airbus A320-214 | Afriqiyah Airways Flight 209 |
| 5A-ONG | Airbus A330-243 | Afriqiyah Airways Flight 771 |

=== Luxembourg ===
| Tail number | Description | Related article |
| LX-LGB | Fokker 50 | Luxair Flight 9642 |

=== Malaysia ===
| Tail number | Description | Related article |
| 9M-ATZ | GAF Nomad | Double Six Crash |
| 9M-MBD | Boeing 737-200 | Malaysian Airline System Flight 653 |
| 9M-MGH | Fokker 50 | Malaysia Airlines Flight 2133 |
| 9M-MIA | Dornier 228 | Royal Brunei Airlines Flight 238 |
| 9M-MRD | Boeing 777-200ER | Malaysia Airlines Flight 17 |
| 9M-MRO | Boeing 777-200ER | Malaysia Airlines Flight 370 |

=== Malta ===
| Tail number | Description | Related article |
| 9H-ABF | Boeing 737-2Y5Adv | Air Malta Flight 830 |

=== Moldova ===
| Tail number | Description | Related article |
| ER-26068 | Antonov An-26 | 2007 Balad aircraft crash |
| ER-AVB | Antonov An-26 | 2017 Valan International Antonov An-26 crash |

=== Mozambique ===
| Tail number | Description | Related article |
| C9-CAA | Tupolev Tu-134A-3 | 1986 Mozambican Tupolev Tu-134 crash |
| C9-EMC | Embraer ERJ-190 | LAM Mozambique Airlines Flight 470 |

=== Mexico ===
| Tail number | Description | Related article |
| XA-GAL | Embraer E-190 | Aeroméxico Connect Flight 2431 |
| XA-JED | McDonnell Douglas DC-9-32 | Aeroméxico Flight 498 |
| XA-JID | Douglas C-47 Skytrain (conversion) | Douglas XCG-17 |
| XA-MEM | Boeing 727-264 | Mexicana Flight 940 |
| XA-SOC | McDonnell Douglas DC-9 | Aeroméxico Flight 229 |
| XA-TKN | McDonnell Douglas DC-9-31 | TAESA Flight 725 |
| XA-TUE | Airbus A300B4F | Aerounion – Aerotransporte de Carga Union Flight 302 |
| XA-UCI | Learjet 55 | Med Jets Flight 056 |
| XA-UHZ | Boeing 737-201 Adv | Cubana de Aviación Flight 972 |
| XB-MNP | Boeing 727 | 2012 Boeing 727 crash experiment |
| XC-OPS | Douglas C-47 Skytrain (conversion) | Douglas XCG-17 |
| XC-VMC | Learjet 45 | 2008 Mexico City plane crash |

=== Myanmar ===
| Tail number | Description | Related article |
| XY-ACM | Douglas C-47 | 1972 Thandwe crash |
| XY-AGC | Fokker 100 | Air Bagan Flight 11 |

=== Nepal ===
| Tail number | Description | Related article |
| 9N-ABB | de Havilland Canada DHC-6 Twin Otter | Nepal Airlines Flight 183 |
| 9N-ABO | de Havilland Canada DHC-6 Twin Otter | Nepal Airlines Flight 555 |
| 9N-ABP | de Havilland Canada DHC-6 Twin Otter | 2000 Royal Nepal Airlines DHC-6 crash |
| 9N-AEG | BAe 748 Super 2B | Necon Air Flight 128 |
| 9N-AEK | Beechcraft 1900D | Buddha Air Flight 103 |
| 9N-AEQ | de Havilland Canada DHC-6 Twin Otter | 2006 Yeti Airlines Twin Otter Crash |
| 9N-AFE | de Havilland Canada DHC-6 Twin Otter | Yeti Airlines Flight 103 |
| 9N-AFR | de Havilland Canada DHC-6 Twin Otter | 2002 Shangri-La Air Twin Otter Crash |
| 9N-AFX | de Havilland Canada DHC-6 Twin Otter | 2010 Okhaldhunga Twin Otter crash |
| 9N-AHA | Dornier 228 | Sita Air Flight 601 |
| 9N-AHE | Dornier 228 | Agni Air Flight 101 |
| 9N-AHH | de Havilland Canada DHC-6 Twin Otter | Tara Air Flight 193 |
| 9N-AIG | Dornier 228 | Agni Air Flight CHT |
| 9N-AJB | PAC 750XL | 2016 Air Kasthamandap crash |
| 9N-AKY | Let L-410 | Summit Air Flight 409 |
| 9N-AME | Bombardier CRJ200LR | 2024 Saurya Airlines Bombardier CRJ200 crash |

=== Netherlands ===
| Tail number | Description | Related article |
| H-NADU | Fokker F.VIII | 1927 KLM Fokker F.VIII crash |
| PH-AIZ | Fokker F.XX | Fokker F.XX |
| PH-AKL | Douglas DC-2-115E | 1936 KLM Croydon accident |
| PH-BFC | Boeing 747-406M | KLM Flight 867 |
| PH-BUF | Boeing 747-206B | Tenerife disaster |
| PH-CHI | Fokker F28 Fellowship 4000 | NLM CityHopper Flight 431 |
| PH-DCL | Douglas DC-8-53 | Viasa Flight 897 |
| PH-DTF | Dassault Falcon 900EX | Max Verstappen |
| PH-KSH | Saab 340 | KLM Cityhopper Flight 433 |
| PH-LKM | Lockheed L-1049H Super Constellation | KLM Flight 607-E |
| PH-LKT | Lockheed L-1049E Super Constellation | KLM Flight 844 |
| PH-LKY | Lockheed L-1049C Super Constellation | KLM Flight 633 |
| PH-LLM | Lockheed L-188 Electra | KLM Flight 823 |
| PH-MBH | Douglas DC-8 | Martinair Flight 138 |
| PH-MBN | McDonnell Douglas DC-10 | Martinair Flight 495 |
| PH-TEN | Lockheed L-049-46-25 Constellation | 1948 KLM Constellation air disaster |
| PH-TFA | Douglas DC-3 | Hurum air disaster |

=== New Zealand ===
| Tail number | Description | Related article |
| ZK-AYZ | Douglas DC-3C | New Zealand National Airways Corporation Flight 441 |
| ZK-ECN | British Aerospace Jetstream | Eagle Airways Flight 2279 |
| ZK-ENX | Piper PA 28-181 | 1993 Auckland mid-air collision |
| ZK-EUF | Fletcher FU-24 | 2010 New Zealand Fletcher FU24 crash |
| ZK-HIT | Aérospatiale AS 355 F1 | 1993 Auckland mid-air collision |
| ZK-NEY | De Havilland Canada DHC-8-102 | Ansett New Zealand Flight 703 |
| ZK-NZP | McDonnell Douglas DC-10 | Air New Zealand Flight 901 |
| ZK-POA | Fairchild SA227-AC Metro III | Airwork Flight 23 |
| ZK-XXF | Cameron A210 | 2012 Carterton hot air balloon crash |

=== Nigeria ===
| Tail number | Description | Related article |
| 5N-BFK | Boeing 737-2B7 | ADC Airlines Flight 53 |
| 5N-BFN | Boeing 737-200 | Bellview Airlines Flight 210 |
| 5N-BJN | Boeing 727-221Adv(F) | Allied Air Cargo Flight DHV-3 |
| 5N-ESF | BAC One-Eleven 500 | EAS Airlines Flight 4226 |
| 5N-RAM | McDonnell Douglas MD-83 | Dana Air Flight 992 |

=== North Korea ===
| Tail number | Description | Related article |
| P-889 | Ilyushin IL-62M | 1983 Chosonminhang Ilyushin Il-62 crash |

=== Norway ===
| Tail number | Description | Related article |
| LN-BNK | De Havilland Canada DHC-6 Twin Otter | Widerøe Flight 933 |
| LN-BNM | De Havilland Canada DHC-6 Twin Otter | Widerøe Flight 744 |
| LN-BNS | De Havilland Canada DHC-6 Twin Otter | Widerøe Flight 839 |
| LN-DAE | Junkers Ju 52 | Havørn Accident |
| LN-IAV | Short S.25 Sandringham 6 | Kvitbjørn disaster |
| LN-IAW | Short S.25 Sandringham 5 | Bukken Bruse disaster |
| LN-MOO | McDonnell Douglas DC-8-62 | Scandinavian Airlines Flight 933 |
| LN-OJF | Eurocopter 225LP Super Puma | 2016 Turøy helicopter crash |
| LN-PAA | Convair 580 | Partnair Flight 394 |
| LN-RDI | DHC-8-400 | Dash 8 landing gear incidents |
| LN-RDK | DHC-8-400 | Dash 8 landing gear incidents |
| LN-RDS | DHC-8-400 | Dash 8 landing gear incidents |
| LN-SUG | Boeing 737-205 | Braathens SAFE Flight 139 |
| LN-SUR | De Havilland DH-114 Heron 2B | Hummelfjell Accident |
| LN-SUY | Fokker F28 Fellowship | Braathens SAFE Flight 239 |
| LN-WFN | De Havilland Canada Dash 7 | Widerøe Flight 710 |
| N-1 | Semi-rigid airship | Norge (airship) |

=== Oman ===
| Tail number | Description | Related article |
| A4O-BK | Boeing 737-200 | Gulf Air Flight 771 |

=== Pakistan ===
| Tail number | Description | Related article |
| AP-AMH | Boeing 720-040B | PIA Flight 705 |
| AP-AOC | Sikorsky S-61 | Pakistan International Airlines Flight 17 |
| AP-AUS | Fokker F-27 Friendship | Pakistan International Airlines Flight 631 |
| AP-AWZ | Boeing 707-430C | PIA Flight 740 |
| AP-BAL | Fokker F27 | PIA Flight 688 |
| AP-BCP | Airbus A300B4-203 | PIA Flight 268 |
| AP-BHO | ATR 42-500 | PIA Flight 661 |
| AP-BJB | Airbus A321 | Airblue Flight 202 |
| AP-BJD | Beechcraft 1900C-1 | 2010 Karachi Beechcraft 1900 crash |
| AP-BKC | Boeing 737-236 | Bhoja Air Flight 213 |
| AP-BLD | Airbus A320 | Pakistan International Airlines Flight 8303 |
| AP-BLF | Boeing 737-33A | 2014 Jinnah International Airport attack |
| AP-BOI | Boeing 737-400 | K2 Airways Flight 1732 |

=== Panama ===
| Tail number | Description | Related article |
| HP-1202AC | Embraer EMB 110 Bandeirante | Alas Chiricanas Flight 00901 |
| HP-1205 | Boeing 737-204 Advanced | COPA Flight 201 |

=== Papua New Guinea ===
| Tail number | Description | Related article |
| P2-MCB | DHC-6 Twin Otter | Airlines PNG Flight 4684 |
| P2-PXE | Boeing 737-800 | Air Niugini Flight 73 |
| P2-SBC | Britten-Norman BN-2T Turbine Islander | 2016 Sunbird Aviation crash |

=== Peru ===
| Tail number | Description | Related article |
| FAP-351 | Boeing 737-282 | 1998 Occidental Petroleum Boeing 737 crash |
| OB-1396 | Fokker F28-1000 Fellowship | TANS Perú Flight 222 |
| OB-1451 | Boeing 737-222 | Faucett Flight 251 |
| OB-1809-P | Boeing 737-244 | TANS Perú Flight 204 |
| OB-2036-P | Boeing 737-300 | Peruvian Airlines Flight 112 |
| OB-R-939 | Lockheed L-188A Electra | LANSA Flight 502 |
| OB-R-941 | Lockheed L-188A Electra | LANSA Flight 508 |

=== Philippines ===
| Tail number | Description | Related article |
| PI-C1102 | Hawker Siddeley HS-748-209 Srs. 2 | Philippine Airlines Flight 215 |
| PI-C1131 | BAC One-Eleven | Philippine Air Lines Flight 158 |
| RP-C803 | McDonnell Douglas DC-8-53 | Philippine Airlines Flight 421 |
| RP-C1015 | Hawker Siddeley HS 748 | Philippine Airlines Flight 206 |
| RP-C1507 | McDonnell Douglas DC-9-32 | Cebu Pacific Flight 387 |
| RP-C3010 | Boeing 737-2H4 | Air Philippines Flight 541 |
| RP-C3222 | Airbus A320-214 | Philippine Airlines Flight 137 |
| RP-C3224 | Airbus A320-214 | Philippine Airlines Flight 475 |
| RP-C3441 | Airbus A340300 | Air Canada Flight 759 |
| RP-C3592 | NAMC YS-11 | Asian Spirit Flight 321 |
| RP-C3880 | Let L-410 Turbolet | Asian Spirit Flight 100 |
| RP-C8023 | Canadair CL-44-O | Conroy Skymonster |

=== Poland ===
| Tail number | Description | Related article |
| SP-LAA | Ilyushin Il-62 | LOT Polish Airlines Flight 007 |
| SP-LBG | Ilyushin Il-62M | LOT Polish Airlines Flight 5055 |
| SP-LTD | Antonov An-24 | LOT Polish Airlines Flight 703 |
| SP-LTF | Antonov An-24W | LOT Polish Airlines Flight 165 |
| SP-LPC | Boeing 767-300 | LOT Polish Airlines Flight 16 |
| SP-RSM | Boeing 737-800 | Ryanair Flight 4978 |

=== Portugal ===
| Tail number | Description | Related article |
| CS-TBR | Boeing 727-282Adv | TAP Portugal Flight 425 |

=== Rhodesia ===
| Tail number | Description | Related article |
| VP-WAS | Vickers Viscount | Air Rhodesia Flight 825 |
| VP-YFD | Douglas C-47A | 1947 Croydon Dakota accident |
| VP-YND | Vickers Viscount | Air Rhodesia Flight 827 |

=== Romania ===
| Tail number | Description | Related article |
| YR-AMR | Antonov An-24 | Banat Air Flight 166 |
| YR-BGC | Boeing 737-300 | TAROM Flight 3107 |
| YR-BNP | Britten-Norman BN-2A-27 Islander | 2014 Romania Britten-Norman Islander crash |
| YR-LCC | Airbus A310-324 | TAROM Flight 371 |

=== Russia ===
| Tail number | Description | Related article |
| RA-02795 | Embraer Legacy 600 | 2023 Tver Oblast plane crash |
| RA-11125 | Antonov An-12 | 2011 Avis Amur Antonov An-12 crash |
| RA-12957 | Antonov An-12 | 2008 Chelyabinsk Antonov An-12 crash |
| RA-22657 | Mil Mi-8 | 2013 Siberia Polar Airlines Mil Mi-8 crash |
| RA-25656 | Mil Mi-8 | 2024 Kamchatka Mil Mi-8 crash |
| RA-26085 | Antonov An-26 | Petropavlovsk-Kamchatsky Air Flight 251 (2021) |
| RA-26222 | Antonov An-32B | 1996 Air Africa crash |
| RA-27003 | Mil Mi-8 | United Nations Flight 544 shootdown |
| RA-28715 | Antonov An-28 | Petropavlovsk-Kamchatsky Air Flight 251 (2012) |
| RA-28728 | Antonov An-28 | SiLA Airlines Flight 42 |
| RA-42434 | Yakovlev Yak-42 | 2011 Lokomotiv Yaroslavl plane crash |
| RA-46516 | Antonov An-24 | Stavropolskaya Aktsionernaya Avia Flight 1023 |
| RA-46524 | Antonov An-24 | Katekavia Flight 9357 |
| RA-47302 | Antonov An-24 | Angara Airlines Flight 9007 |
| RA-47315 | Antonov An-24 | Angara Airlines Flight 2311 |
| RA-47366 | Antonov An-24 | Angara Airlines Flight 200 |
| RA-61704 | Antonov An-148 | Saratov Airlines Flight 703 |
| RA-64011 | Tupolev Tu-204-100 | Aviastar-TU Flight 1906 |
| RA-64047 | Tupolev Tu-204 | Red Wings Airlines Flight 9268 |
| RA-65021 | Tupolev Tu-134A-3 | UTair Flight 471 |
| RA-65080 | Tupolev Tu-134A-3 | 2004 Russian aircraft bombings |
| RA-65691 | Tupolev Tu-134 | RusAir Flight 9605 |
| RA-76389 | Ilyushin Il-76 | Armed Forces of the Russian Federation Flight 9064 |
| RA-76842 | Ilyushin Il-76TD | Airstan incident |
| RA-82005 | Antonov An-124 | 1997 Irkutsk Antonov An-124 crash |
| RA-82042 | Antonov An-124 Ruslan | Volga-Dnepr Airlines Flight 4066 |
| RA-85164 | Tupolev Tu-154B | Khabarovsk United Air Group Flight 3949 |
| RA-85185 | Tupolev Tu-154M | Pulkovo Aviation Enterprise Flight 612 |
| RA-85556 | Tupolev Tu-154B-2 | 2004 Russian aircraft bombings |
| RA-85572 | Tupolev Tu-154 | 2016 Russian Defence Ministry Tupolev Tu-154 crash |
| RA-85588 | Tupolev Tu-154M | Kolavia Flight 348 |
| RA-85621 | Tupolev Tu-154M | Vnukovo Airlines Flight 2801 |
| RA-85656 | Tupolev Tu-154M | Baikal Airlines Flight 130 |
| RA-85684 | Tupolev Tu-154M | Alrosa Mirny Air Enterprise Flight 514 |
| RA-85693 | Tupolev Tu-154M | Siberia Airlines Flight 1812 |
| RA-85744 | Tupolev Tu-154 | Dagestan Airlines Flight 372 |
| RA-85787 | Tupolev Tu-154M | Taban Air Flight 6437 |
| RA-85816 | Tupolev Tu-154M | Bashkirian Airlines Flight 2937 |
| RA-85845 | Tupolev Tu-154M | Vladivostok Air Flight 352 |
| RA-89098 | Sukhoi Superjet 100 | Aeroflot Flight 1492 |
| RF-76801 | Ilyushin Il-76 | 2009 Yakutia Ilyushin Il-76 crash |
| 61708 | Antonov An-148 | 2011 Antonov An-148 crash |
| 97004 | Sukhoi Superjet 100 | Mount Salak Sukhoi Su-100 crash |

=== São Tomé and Príncipe ===
| Tail number | Description | Related article |
| S9-TLZ | Antonov An-26 | 2017 South Supreme Airlines Wau An-26 crash |

=== Saudi Arabia ===
| Tail number | Description | Related article |
| HZ-AHK | Lockheed L-1011-200 TriStar | Saudia Flight 163 |
| HZ-AIH | Boeing 747-168B | 1996 Charkhi Dadri mid-air collision |
| HZ-IBN | Embraer EMB-505 Phenom 300 | 2015 Blackbushe Airport crash |

=== Singapore ===
| Tail number | Description | Related article |
| 9V-SPK | Boeing 747-412 | Singapore Airlines Flight 6 |
| 9V-STP | Airbus A310-300 | Singapore Airlines Flight 117 |
| 9V-SWB | Boeing 777-312ER | Singapore Airlines Flight 368 |
| 9V-SWM | Boeing 777-312ER | Singapore Airlines Flight 321 |
| 9V-TRF | Boeing 737-36N | SilkAir Flight 185 |

=== Slovakia ===
| Tail number | Description | Related article |
| OM-ODQ | Let L-410 | 2015 Červený Kameň mid-air collision |
| OM-SAB | Let L-410 | 2015 Červený Kameň mid-air collision |

=== Slovenia ===
| Tail number | Description | Related article |
| S5-OLM | Lindstrand LBL 180A | 2012 Ljubljana Marshes hot air balloon crash |

=== South Africa ===
| Tail number | Description | Related article |
| ZS-CVA | Vickers Viscount | South African Airways Flight 406 |
| ZS-EUW | Boeing 707-344C | South African Airways Flight 228 |
| ZS-NRM | BAe Jetstream 41 | Airlink Flight 8911 |
| ZS-SAS | Boeing 747-244M | South African Airways Flight 295 |

=== South Korea ===
| Tail number | Description | Related article |
| HL7229 | Boeing 737-5L9 | Asiana Airlines Flight 733 |
| HL7406 | Boeing 707-3B5C | Korean Air Flight 858 |
| HL7429 | Boeing 707-321 | Korean Air Flight 902 |
| HL7442 | Boeing 747-230B | Korean Air Flight 007 |
| HL7445 | Boeing 747-230B | Korean Air Flight 015 |
| HL7451 | Boeing 747-2B5F | Korean Air Cargo Flight 8509 |
| HL7468 | Boeing 747-3B5 | Korean Air Flight 801 |
| HL7525 | Airbus A330-300 | Korean Air Flight 631 |
| HL7742 | Boeing 777-200ER | Asiana Airlines Flight 214 |
| HL7762 | Airbus A320-232 | Asiana Airlines Flight 162 |
| HL7763 | Airbus A321-200 | Air Busan Flight 391 |
| HL8088 | Boeing 737-800 | Jeju Air Flight 2216 |

=== Soviet Union ===
CCCP are the Cyrillic letters for SSSR, which was the official registration prefix for the Soviet Union. CCCP is generally quoted in English sources, and is used here.

| Tail number | Description | Related article |
| CCCP-B6 | Semi-rigid airship | SSSR-V6 OSOAVIAKhIM |
| CCCP-I20 | Tupolev ANT-20 | Tupolev ANT-20 |
| CCCP-L760 | Tupolev ANT-20bis | Tupolev ANT-20 |
| CCCP-11000 | Antonov An-12B | 1971 January 22 Surgut Aeroflot Antonov An-12 crash |
| CCCP-11215 | Antonov An-10A | Aeroflot Flight 1491 |
| CCCP-11747 | Antonov An-12 | 1985 Aeroflot Antonov An-12 shoot-down |
| CCCP-12996 | Antonov An-12B | 1971 January 31 Surgut Aeroflot Antonov An-12 crash |
| CCCP-42370 | Tupolev Tu-104A | Aeroflot Flight 902 |
| CCCP-42444 | Tupolev Tu-104B | Aeroflot Flight 1691 |
| CCCP-42486 | Tupolev Tu-104B | Aeroflot Flight 964 |
| CCCP-42506 | Tupolev Tu-104B | Aeroflot Flight 3932 |
| CCCP-42529 | Yakovlev Yak-42 | Aeroflot Flight 8641 |
| CCCP-42845 | Antonov An-24 | Yakutsk United Air Group Flight 101/435 |
| СCСР-45021 | Tupolev Tu-124 | 1963 Aeroflot Tupolev Tu-124 Neva river ditching |
| CCCP-45037 | Tupolev Tu-124V | Aeroflot Flight 2003 |
| CCCP-45086 | Tupolev Tu-124V | Aeroflot Flight 99 |
| CCCP-46256 | Antonov An-24 | Aeroflot Flight 244 |
| CCCP-46518 | Antonov An-24 | 1976 Anapa mid-air collision |
| CCCP-46617 | Antonov An-24RV | Aeroflot Flight 601 |
| CCCP-46653 | Antonov An-24RV | Aeroflot Flight 811 |
| CCCP-47195 | Antonov An-24 | Gambell incident |
| CCCP-65120 | Tupolev Tu-134AK | Aeroflot Flight 2306 |
| CCCP-65129 | Tupolev Tu-134A | Aeroflot Flight 5463 |
| CCCP-65735 | Tupolev Tu-134AK | 1979 Dniprodzerzhynsk mid-air collision |
| CCCP-65766 | Tupolev Tu-134A | Aeroflot Flight 6502 |
| CCCP-65795 | Tupolev Tu-134A | Aeroflot Flight 892 |
| CCCP-65807 | Tupolev Tu-134A | Aeroflot Flight 6833 |
| CCCP-65816 | Tupolev Tu-134A | 1979 Dniprodzerzhynsk mid-air collision |
| CCCP-65856 | Tupolev Tu-134A | Aeroflot Flight 8381 |
| CCCP-65910 | Tupolev Tu-134A | Aeroflot Flight 7841 |
| CCCP-74298 | Ilyushin Il-18V | Aeroflot Flight 558 |
| CCCP-75531 | Ilyushin Il-18V | Aeroflot Flight 721 |
| CCCP-75538 | Ilyushin Il-18V | Aeroflot Flight 2230 |
| CCCP-77102 | Tupolev Tu-144S | 1973 Paris Air Show crash |
| CCCP-75538 | Ilyushin Il-18 | Aeroflot Flight 2230 |
| CCCP-82060 | Antonov An-225 Mriya | Antonov An-225 Mriya |
| CCCP-85023 | Tupolev Tu-154 | Aeroflot Flight 141 |
| CCCP-85102 | Tupolev Tu-154M | Aeroflot Flight 418 |
| CCCP-85169 | Tupolev Tu-154M | Aeroflot Flight 6709 |
| CCCP-85243 | Tupolev Tu-154B-1 | Aeroflot Flight 3352 |
| CCCP-85311 | Tupolev Tu-154B-2 | Aeroflot Flight 7425 |
| CCCP-85355 | Tupolev Tu-154B-2 | Aeroflot Flight 4227 |
| CCCP-85480 | Tupolev Tu-154B-2 | Aeroflot Flight 3603 |
| CCCP-86513 | Ilyushin Il-62M | Aeroflot Flight 411 |
| CCCP-86614 | Ilyushin Il-62M | Aeroflot Flight 331 |
| CCCP-86671 | Ilyushin Il-62 | Aeroflot Flight 217 |
| CCCP-87618 | Yakovlev Yak-40 | Aeroflot Flight 505 |
| CCCP-87772 | Yakovlev Yak-40 | 1976 Anapa mid-air collision |
| CCCP-87826 | Yakovlev Yak-40 | Aeroflot Flight 528 |

=== Spain ===
| Tail number | Description | Related article |
| EC-AIN | Lockheed L-1049 Super Constellation | Iberia Flight 401 |
| EC-ANR | SNCASE Languedoc | 1958 Aviaco SNCASE Languedoc crash |
| EC-ATV | Sud Aviation SE 210 Caravelle | Iberia Airlines Flight 602 |
| EC-BDD | Sud Aviation Caravelle | Iberia Airlines Flight 062 |
| EC-BIC | Sud Aviation SE 210 Caravelle | Aviaco Flight 118 |
| EC-BII | McDonnell Douglas DC-9-32 | 1973 Nantes mid-air collision |
| EC-BJC | Convair 990 Coronado | 1973 Nantes mid-air collision |
| EC-BNM | Convair 990 Coronado | 1970 Spantax Convair crash |
| EC-BZR | Convair 990 Coronado | Spantax Flight 275 |
| EC-CFJ | Boeing 727-256 | Madrid runway disaster |
| EC-CGS | McDonnell Douglas DC-9-32 | Madrid runway disaster |
| EC-DEG | Douglas DC-10-30 | Spantax Flight 995 |
| EC-DDU | Boeing 727-256 | Iberia Airlines Flight 610 |
| EC-FBC | CASA CN-235 | Binter Mediterráneo Flight 8261 |
| EC-GEO | BAe 146 | PauknAir Flight 4101 |
| EC-HFP | McDonnell Douglas MD-82 | Spanair Flight 5022 |
| EC-ITP | Fairchild Swearingen Metroliner | Manx2 Flight 7100 |
| EC-LTV | McDonnell Douglas MD-83 | Air Algérie Flight 5017 |
| EC-403 | Airbus A400M Atlas | 2015 Seville A400M crash |

=== Sri Lanka ===
| Tail number | Description | Related article |
| 4R-ULD | Lockheed L-1011-385 TriStar | Air Lanka Flight 512 |

=== Sudan ===
| Tail number | Description | Related article |
| ST-AFK | Boeing 737-200 | Sudan Airways Flight 139 |
| ST-AKW | Boeing 707-330C | Azza Transport Flight 2241 |
| ST-ARL | Antonov An-26 | 2012 Sudan Antonov An-26 crash |
| ST-ARQ | Antonov An-24 | Zalingei Tarco Airlines Antonov An-24 crash |
| ST-ATN | Airbus A310-324 | Sudan Airways Flight 109 |

=== Suriname ===
| Tail number | Description | Related article |
| PZ-TSO | Antonov An-28 | 2008 Suriname plane crash |
| PZ-TSV | Antonov An-28 | 2010 Blue Wing Airlines Antonov An-28 crash |

=== Swaziland ===
| Tail number | Description | Related article |
| 3D-NEE | Boeing 747-212B | Jumbo Stay |

=== Sweden ===
| Tail number | Description | Related article |
| SE-APZ | Douglas C-47 Skytrain | Catalina affair |
| SE-BDA | Douglas DC-6B | Northwood mid-air collision |
| SE-CCK | Convair CV-340 Metropolitan | Linjeflyg Flight 277 |
| SE-DMA | McDonnell Douglas MD-87 | Linate Airport disaster |
| SE-DUX | Bombardier CRJ-200 | West Air Sweden Flight 294 |
| SE-FOZ | Vickers Viscount | Linjeflyg Flight 618 |
| SE-IVF | CASA C-212 Aviocar | 2006 Falsterbo Swedish Coast Guard crash |
| SE-MES | Gippsland GA8 Airvan | 2019 Skydive Umeå Gippsland GA8 Airvan crash |

=== Switzerland ===
| Tail number | Description | Related article |
| HB-AKK | Saab 340 | Crossair Flight 498 |
| HB-HOT | Junkers Ju 52/3m4ge | 2018 Ju-Air Junkers Ju 52 crash |
| HB-ICD | Convair CV-990 | Swissair Flight 330 |
| HB-ICK | Sud Aviation SE-210 Caravelle 10R | SA de Transport Aérien Flight 730 |
| HB-ICV | Sud Aviation SE-210 Caravelle III | Swissair Flight 306 |
| HB-IDD | Douglas DC-8 | Swissair Flight 100 |
| HB-IRW | Convair CV-240 | 1954 Swissair Convair CV-240 crash |
| HB-ITB | Bristol Britannia 313 | 1967 Nicosia Britannia disaster |
| HB-IWF | McDonnell Douglas MD-11 | Swissair Flight 111 |
| HB-IXM | Avro RJ100 Regional Jet | Crossair Flight 3597 |
| HB-IZY | Saab 2000 | Crossair Flight 850 |
| HB-NCX | Rockwell Commander 112 | 2002 Pirelli Tower plane crash |
| HB-SIA | Solar Impulse I | Solar Impulse project |
| HB-SIB | Solar Impulse II | Solar Impulse project |

=== Taiwan ===
(Republic of China)

| Tail number | Description | Related article |
| B-150 | McDonnell Douglas MD-11 | China Airlines Flight 642 |
| B-156 | NAMC YS-11 | China Airlines Flight 206 |
| B-165 | Boeing 747-400 | China Airlines Flight 605 |
| B-180 | Boeing 737-209 | China Airlines Flight 204 |
| B-198 | Boeing 747-2R7F | China Airlines Flight 358 |
| B-1814 | Airbus A300R-600R | China Airlines Flight 676 |
| B-1816 | Airbus A300B4-622R | China Airlines Flight 140 |
| B-2009 | Handley Page Dart Herald | Far Eastern Air Transport Flight 104 |
| B-2603 | Boeing 737-222 | Far Eastern Air Transport Flight 103 |
| B-18255 | Boeing 747-209B | China Airlines Flight 611 |
| B-18616 | Boeing 737-809 | China Airlines Flight 120 |
| B-22810 | ATR 72-500 | TransAsia Airways Flight 222 |
| B-22816 | ATR 72-600 | TransAsia Airways Flight 235 |
| 32 | Douglas DC-2 | Kweilin Incident |

=== Tajikistan ===
| Tail number | Description | Related article |
| EY-406 | Antonov An-12BK | 2015 Juba plane crash |
| EY-87995 | Yakovlev Yak-40 | 1993 Tajik Air Yakovlev Yak-40 incident |

=== Tanzania ===
| Tail number | Description | Related article |
| 5H-PWF | ATR 42 | Precision Air Flight 494 |

=== Thailand ===
| Tail number | Description | Related article |
| HS-OMG | McDonnell Douglas MD-82 | One-Two-GO Airlines Flight 269 |
| HS-PGL | ART-72-212A | Bangkok Airways Flight 266 |
| HS-TBC | Boeing 737-2P5 | Thai Airways Flight 365 |
| HS-TDC | Boeing 737-4D7 | Thai Airways International Flight 114 |
| HS-TGI | Sud Aviation Caravelle | Thai Airways International Flight 601 |
| HS-THB | Hawker Siddeley HS 748 | Thai Airways Flight 231 |
| HS-TIA | Airbus A310-300 | Thai Airways International Flight 261 |
| HS-TID | Airbus A310-304 | Thai Airways International Flight 311 |

=== Togo ===
| Tail number | Description | Related article |
| 5V-MAG | Douglas C-47 | 1974 Togo plane crash |

=== Turkey ===
| Tail number | Description | Related article |
| TC-ACF | Boeing 747-481BDSF | Emirates SkyCargo Flight 9788 |
| TC-AKM | McDonnell Douglas MD-83 | Atlasjet Flight 4203 |
| TC-CPF | Boeing 737-82R | Pegasus Airlines Flight 8622 |
| TC-ETI | Douglas C-47A | 1964 Turkish Airlines Ankara crash |
| TC-GEN | Boeing 757-225 | Birgenair Flight 301 |
| TC-HEK | Bell 206L-4 LongRanger | 2009 Medair Bell 206 crash |
| TC-IZK | Boeing 737-800 | Pegasus Airlines Flight 2193 |
| TC-JAO | Fokker F28 Fellowship 1000 | Turkish Airlines Flight 301 |
| TC-JAP | Fokker F28 Fellowship 1000 | Turkish Airlines Flight 345 |
| TC-JAT | Fokker F28 Fellowship 1000 | 1979 Turkish Airlines Ankara crash |
| TC-JAV | McDonnell Douglas DC-10-10 | Turkish Airlines Flight 981 |
| TC-JBH | Boeing 727-2F2 | Turkish Airlines Flight 452 |
| TC-JBR | Boeing 727-2F2 | Turkish Airlines Flight 158 |
| TC-JDM | Airbus A340-311 | Deli Mike |
| TC-JEP | Boeing 737-4Q8 | Turkish Airlines Flight 5904 |
| TC-JES | Boeing 737-4Y0 | Turkish Airlines Flight 278 |
| TC-JET | Boeing 737-400 | Turkish Airlines Flight 1476 |
| TC-JGE | Boeing 737-8F2 | Turkish Airlines Flight 1951 |
| TC-JPE | Airbus A320-200 | Turkish Airlines Flight 1878 |
| TC-KOP | Fairchild F-27 | 1962 Turkish Airlines Taurus Mountains crash |
| TC-MCL | Boeing 747-400F | Turkish Airlines Flight 6491 |
| TC-SEV | Vickers Viscount 793 | 1959 Turkish Airlines Gatwick crash |
| TC-TAY | Fokker F27 Friendship 100 | 1961 Turkish Airlines Ankara crash |
| TC-THG | Avro RJ100 | Turkish Airlines Flight 634 |

=== Uganda ===
| Tail number | Description | Related article |
| 5X-TUC | Lockheed L-100 Hercules | Transafrik International Flight 662 |

=== Ukraine ===
| Tail number | Description | Related article |
| UR-PSR | Boeing 737-800 | Ukraine International Airlines Flight 752 |
| UR-42334 | Yakovlev Yak-42 | Aerosvit Flight 241 |
| UR-82060 | Antonov An-225 Mriya | Antonov An-225 Mriya |

=== United Arab Emirates ===
| Tail number | Description | Related article |
| A6-EMW | Boeing 777-31H | Emirates Flight 521 |
| A6-ERG | Airbus A340-500 | Emirates Flight 407 |
| A6-FDN | Boeing 737-800 | Flydubai Flight 981 |
| A6-FKF | Boeing 737 MAX-8 | Flydubai Flight 1073 |

=== United Kingdom ===
| Tail number | Description | Related article |
| G-AACI | Armstrong Whitworth Argosy | The City of Liverpool disaster |
| G-AAIG | Hendy Hobo | Hendy Hobo |
| G-AAIN | Parnall Elf | Parnall Elf |
| G-AAZK | Junkers F13ge | Meopham air disaster |
| G-ABLU | Avro 618 Ten | 1933 Imperial Airways Ruysselede crash |
| G-ABXW | Saro Cloud | 1936 Jersey Air Disaster |
| G-ACPM | de Havilland DH.89A Dragon Rapide | 1934 Hillman's Airways de Havilland Dragon Rapide crash |
| G-ACSY | Airspeed Courier | 1934 London, Scottish & Provincial Airways Airspeed Courier crash |
| G-ACZN | de Havilland Express | 1938 Jersey Airport disaster |
| G-ADCS | Martin-Baker MB 1 | Martin-Baker MB 1 |
| G-ADDL | De Bruyne Snark | De Bruyne Snark |
| G-ADNO | de Havilland T.K.2 | de Havilland T.K.2 |
| G-ADUU | Short S.23 Empire | 1939 Imperial Airways flying boat ditching |
| G-AEUH | Short Empire | 1942 Qantas Short Empire shoot-down |
| G-AEXT | Dart Kitten | Dart Kitten |
| G-AEZD | Martin-Baker MB 2 | Martin-Baker MB 2 |
| G-AGBB | Douglas DC-3 | BOAC Flight 777 |
| G-AGJX | Douglas C-47A | 1947 BOAC Douglas C-47 crash |
| G-AGPW | Bristol Brabazon | Bristol Brabazon |
| G-AGRE | Avro Tudor IV | G-AGRE Star Ariel |
| G-AGRH | Avro Super Trader | 1959 Air Charter Turkey crash |
| G-AGWH | Avro Lancastrian | Star Dust |
| G-AGZB | Douglas Dakota | 1962 Channel Airways Dakota accident |
| G-AHCS | Douglas C-47A Skytrain | British European Airways Flight 530 |
| G-AHCW | Douglas Dakota | 1949 Exhall mid-air collision |
| G-AHCY | Douglas DC-3 | 1949 Manchester DC-3 accident |
| G-AHFA | Avro York | 1953 Skyways Avro York disappearance |
| G-AHNP | Avro Tudor IV | Star Tiger |
| G-AHPM | Vickers 610 Viking 3B | 1961 Holtaheia Vickers Viking crash |
| G-AHPN | Vickers VC.1 Viking | 1950 Heathrow BEA Viking accident |
| G-AICS | Bristol Freighter | Winter Hill air disaster |
| G-AIJE | Vickers VC.1 Viking | 1958 London Vickers Viking accident |
| G-AIVE | Vickers 610 Viking 1B | British European Airways Flight S200P |
| G-AJBO | Vickers VC.1 Viking | 1957 Blackbushe Viking accident |
| G-AJDL | Vickers VC.1 Viking | 1953 Nutts Corner Viking accident |
| G-AJVZ | Douglas Dakota 3 | 1951 Ringway Dakota accident |
| G-AKBY | Avro Tudor 5 | Llandow air disaster |
| G-AKNU | Short Solent 3 | 1957 Aquila Airways Solent crash |
| G-ALAM | Lockheed Constellation | 1954 BOAC Constellation crash |
| G-ALCV; G-ALCW | Cierva W.11 Air Horse | Cierva W.11 Air Horse |
| G-ALHE | Canadair C-4 Argonaut | 1956 BOAC Argonaut accident |
| G-ALHG | Canadair C-4 Argonaut | Stockport air disaster |
| G-ALSA | Boeing 377 Stratocruiser | 1954 Prestwick air disaster |
| G-ALUN | Saunders-Roe SR.45 Princess | Saunders-Roe SR.45 Princess |
| G-ALWE | Vickers Viscount | British European Airways Flight 411 |
| G-ALYA | Hants and Sussex Aviation Herald | Hants and Sussex Aviation Herald |
| G-ALYP | de Havilland Comet 1 | BOAC Flight 781 |
| G-ALYY | de Havilland Comet 1 | South African Airways Flight 201 |
| G-ALZU | Airspeed Ambassador | Munich air disaster |
| G-AMAD | Airspeed Ambassador | 1968 BKS Air Transport Heathrow crash |
| G-AMOL | Vickers Viscount | Cambrian Airways Liverpool crash |
| G-AMSW | Douglas Dakota IV | 1961 Derby Aviation crash |
| G-AMZD | Douglas Dakota | 1959 Transair Douglas Dakota accident |
| G-ANCA | Bristol Britannia 301 | Downend air crash |
| G-ANHC | Vickers Viscount | British European Airways Flight 142 |
| G-ANSY | Avro York | 1956 Scottish Airlines Malta air disaster |
| G-ANTB | Douglas C-47 | British United Airways Flight 1030X |
| G-AOCE | de Havilland Dove | 1958 Channel Airways de Havilland DH.104 Dove crash |
| G-AOJA | Vickers Viscount | 1957 Nutts Corner BEA Viscount crash |
| G-AOVD | Bristol Britannia 312 | 1958 Bristol Britannia 312 crash |
| G-APFE | Boeing 707-436 | BOAC Flight 911 |
| G-APFK | Boeing 707-436 | 1977 British Airtours Boeing 707 crash |
| G-APKF | Vickers Viscount | 1968 BKS Air Transport Heathrow crash |
| G-ARCO | de Havilland Comet 4B | Cyprus Airways Flight 284 |
| G-ARMV | Avro 748-101 Series 1 | 1965 Skyways Coach-Air Avro 748 crash |
| G-ARPI | Hawker Siddeley Trident 1C | 1968 BKS Air Transport Heathrow crash, Staines Air Disaster |
| G-ARPT | Hawker Siddeley Trident 1C | 1968 BKS Air Transport Heathrow crash |
| G-ARPY | Hawker Siddeley Trident 1C | 1966 Felthorpe Trident crash |
| G-ARWE | Boeing 707-465 | BOAC Flight 712, Jane Harrison (GC) |
| G-ARUD | Douglas DC-7 | Caledonian Airways Flight 153 |
| G-ASGN | Vickers VC-10 | BOAC Flight 775 |
| G-ASHG | BAC One-Eleven 200AB | 1963 BAC One-Eleven test crash |
| G-ASPL | Hawker Siddeley HS 748 series 2A | Dan-Air Flight 240 |
| G-ASVX | Piper PA-25-235 Pawnee | 1974 Norfolk mid-air collision |
| G-ASWI | Westland Wessex | G-ASWI North Sea ditching |
| G-ATEL | Aviation Traders ATL.90 Accountant | Aviation Traders Accountant |
| G-AWND | Boeing 747-136 | British Airways Flight 149 |
| G-AWZT | Hawker Siddeley Trident 3B | 1976 Zagreb mid-air collision |
| G-AXMJ | BAC One-Eleven 528 | Court Line Flight 95 |
| G-AXOP | Vickers Vanguard | Invicta International Airlines Flight 435 |
| G-AYDE | Piper PA-23 Aztec | Court Line Flight 95 |
| G-BBDG | Concorde | G-BBDG |
| G-BDAN | Boeing 727-46 | Dan-Air Flight 1008 |
| G-BDXH | Boeing 747-236B | British Airways Flight 9 |
| G-BEBP | Boeing 707-321C | 1977 Dan-Air Boeing 707 crash |
| G-BEDF | Boeing B-17G Flying Fortress | Sally B |
| G-BEID | Sikorsky S-61N | 1988 British International Helicopters Sikorsky S-61N crash |
| G-BEKF | Hawker Siddeley HS 748 | Dan-Air Flight 0034 |
| G-BEON | Sikorsky S-61N | 1983 British Airways Sikorsky S-61 crash |
| G-BFXI | Hawker Hunter | Shoreham Airport disaster |
| G-BGJL | Boeing 737-236 | British Airtours Flight 28M |
| G-BJRT | BAC One-Eleven | British Airways Flight 5390 |
| G-BJVX | Sikorsky S-76A | 2002 Bristow Helicopters Sikorsky S-76A crash |
| G-BLUN | Eurocopter AS365 Dauphin | 2006 Morecambe Bay helicopter crash |
| G-BNLG | Boeing 747-436 | British Airways Flight 268 |
| G-BOAG | Concorde | Transcontinental flight |
| G-BOMG | Pilatus Britten-Norman BN2B-26 Islander | 2005 Loganair Islander accident |
| G-BRAC | Bristol Britannia | Buccaneer (TV series) |
| G-BTWR | Bell P-63 Kingcobra | 2001 Biggin Hill Airshow crashes |
| G-BWFC | Boeing 234LR Chinook | 1986 British International Helicopters Chinook crash |
| G-BFXI | Hawker Hunter | 2015 Shoreham Airshow crash |
| G-BYAG | Boeing 757-204 | Britannia Airways Flight 226A |
| G-CRST | Agusta AW109 | Vauxhall helicopter crash |
| G-DHAV | de Havilland Vampire | 2001 Biggin Hill Airshow crashes |
| G-EAMA | Handley Page O/400 | 1920 Handley Page O/400 crash |
| G-EAOU | Vickers Vimy | 1919 England to Australia flight |
| G-EAWO | de Havilland DH.18A | First mid-air collision of airliners |
| G-EBBS | de Havilland DH.34 | 1923 Daimler Airway de Havilland DH.34 crash |
| G-EBBX | de Havilland DH.34 | 1924 Imperial Airways de Havilland DH.34 crash |
| G-EBLB | Vickers Vulcan | 1928 Imperial Airways Vickers Vulcan crash |
| G-EBMT | Handley Page W.10 | 1929 Imperial Airways Handley Page W.10 crash |
| G-EBMZ | de Havilland Hercules | 1929 Jask Imperial Airways De Havilland Hercules crash |
| G-EBTQ | Fokker F.VIIa | St. Raphael (aircraft) |
| G-EZAC | Airbus A319-111 | EasyJet Flight 6074 |
| G-FAAV | Rigid airship | R-100 |
| G-FAAW | Rigid airship | R101 |
| G-GONE | De Havilland Venom | 2001 Biggin Hill Airshow crashes |
| G-LBAL | AgustaWestland AW139 | Haughey Air AgustaWestland AW139 crash, Edward Haughey, Baron Ballyedmond |
| G-MTOV | Solar Wings Pegasus XL-R | Barnes Wallis Moth Machine |
| G-OBME | Boeing 737-400 | Kegworth air disaster |
| G-OHAV | Hybrid airship | HAV-3 |
| G-PHRG | Hybrid airship | Hybrid Air Vehicles HAV 304 Airlander 10 |
| G-REDL | Eurocopter AS332-L2 Super Puma Mk.2 | April 2009 North Sea helicopter crash |
| G-SPAO | Eurocopter EC135-T2+ | 2013 Glasgow helicopter crash |
| G-TIGK | Eurocopter Super Puma | Bristow Flight 56C |
| G-UESS | Cessna Citation I | Stornoway plane crash |
| G-VLCN | Avro Vulcan | Avro Vulcan XH558 |
| G-VSKP | Leonardo AW169 | 2018 Leicester City F.C. helicopter crash |
| G-VWOW | Boeing 747-41R | Cosmic Girl |
| G-WPAS | MD Explorer air ambulance | Wiltshire Air Ambulance |
| G-YMMM | Boeing 777-236ER | British Airways Flight 38 |
| G-12-1 | SR-N1 | SR-N1 |
| G-41-1 | Aviation Traders ATL-90 Accountant | Aviation Traders Accountant |
| M-B-1 (later P9594) | Martin-Baker MB 2 | Martin-Baker MB 2 |
| R38 | Rigid airship | R38 class airship |
| T-0224 | General Aircraft GAL.47 | General Aircraft GAL.47 |

=== United States ===
| Tail number | Description | Related article |
| N4A | Non-rigid airship | Loral GZ-22 |
| N4TV | Bell 206 | 1977 Gary Powers helicopter crash |
| N6TC | Bell 206 | Grand Canyon Airlines Flight 6 |
| N9MB | Northrop N-9MB | 2019 Northrop N-9M crash |
| N25RM | de Havilland Canada DHC-6 Twin Otter 300 | Rocky Mountain Airways Flight 217 |
| N35LX | Boeing 737-330 | Lockheed Martin CATBird |
| N47BA | Learjet 35A | 1999 South Dakota Learjet crash |
| N51BT | Aérospatiale Gazelle | Blue Thunder (helicopter) |
| N52AW | Boeing 757-23A | Aeroperú Flight 603 |
| N55V | Douglas DC-3 | Piedmont Airlines Flight 349 |
| N55VM | Convair CV-240 | 1977 Convair 240 crash |
| N62AF | Boeing 737-222 | Air Florida Flight 90 |
| N71MC | Piper PA-32R | 2009 Hudson River mid-air collision |
| N72EX | Sikorsky S-76B | 2020 Island Express Sikorsky S-76B crash |
| N76GC | De Havilland Canada DHC-6 Twin Otter | Grand Canyon Airlines Flight 6 |
| N87GL | Beechcraft 1900 | United Express Flight 5925 |
| N96PB | Embraer 110 Bandeirante | PBA Flight 1039 |
| N97S | McDonnell Douglas DC-9-31 | Southern Airways Flight 932 |
| N100ME | Douglas DC-9-14 | Midwest Express Airlines Flight 105 |
| N103AA | McDonnell Douglas DC-10-10 | American Airlines Flight 96 |
| N104RB | Lockheed F-104 Starfighter | N104RB Red Baron |
| N106US | Airbus A320-214 | US Airways Flight 1549 |
| N110AA | McDonnell Douglas DC-10 | American Airlines Flight 191 |
| N113WA | McDonnell Douglas DC-10-30 | World Airways Flight 30 |
| N116AX | Beechcraft 1900C-1 | ACE Air Cargo Flight 51 |
| N118GP | Beechcraft Model 99 | GP Express Flight 861 |
| N130CZ | Eurocopter EC130B4 | 2024 Orbic Air Eurocopter EC130 crash |
| N130HP | Lockheed C-130 Hercules | 2002 airtanker crashes |
| N137US | Lockheed L-188 Electra | Northwest Orient Airlines Flight 706 |
| N140SC | Lockheed L-1011 TriStar | Stargazer (aircraft) |
| N155UP | Airbus A300F4-622R | UPS Airlines Flight 1354 |
| N179AC | Erickson S-64F Aircrane | Elvis (helicopter) |
| N190DN | Boeing 767-300 | Delta Air Lines |
| N200BK | AgustaWestland AW109E | 2019 New York City helicopter crash |
| N200WQ | Bombardier Dash 8 | Colgan Air Flight 3407 |
| N202VG | Scaled Composites Model 339 SpaceShipTwo | VSS Unity |
| N215AA | McDonnell Douglas MD-82 | American Airlines Flight 1420 |
| N215TV | Eurocopter AS-350 B2 | 2007 Phoenix news helicopter collision |
| N216MH | Bell 206 | 2025 Hudson River helicopter crash |
| N217AS | Embraer EMB 120 Brasilia | Atlantic Southeast Airlines Flight 2254 |
| N220N | McDonnell 220 | McDonnell 119 |
| N221US | Boeing 737-200 | Eastwind Airlines Flight 517 |
| N232J | Hawker Sea Fury | September Fury |
| N232SW | Embraer EMB 120 Brasilia | 2007 San Francisco International Airport runway incursion |
| N233YV | Beechcraft 1900D | Air Midwest Flight 5481 |
| N240CJ | Beechcraft 1900D | Colgan Air Flight 9446 |
| N256AS | Embraer EMB 120 Brasilia | Atlantic Southeast Airlines Flight 529 |
| N257BW | Cessna Citation II | 2025 North Carolina Cessna Citation II crash |
| N259UP | McDonnell Douglas MD-11F | UPS Airlines Flight 2976 |
| N264DB | Piper PA-46 Malibu | 2019 Piper PA-46 Malibu crash |
| N265CA | Embraer EMB 120 Brasilia | Comair Flight 3272 |
| N269VA | Rutan Model 76 Voyager | Rutan Voyager |
| N270AS | Embraer EMB 120 Brasilia | Atlantic Southeast Airlines Flight 2311 |
| N274US | Boeing 727-251 | Northwest Airlines Flight 6231 |
| N275X | Canadair Sabre Mk 5 | 1972 Sacramento Canadair Sabre accident |
| N277SF | Scaled Composites Model 311 Virgin Atlantic GlobalFlyer | Virgin Atlantic GlobalFlyer |
| N278US | Boeing 727-251 | Northwest Airlines Flight 1482 |
| N280US | Boeing 727-251 | Northwest Airlines Flight 5 |
| N282AU | Boeing 737-2B7 | MetroJet Flight 2710 |
| N286WN | Boeing 737-7H4 | Southwest Airlines Flight 1248 |
| N300WP | Beechcraft Model 99 | Bar Harbor Airlines Flight 1808 |
| N303GA | Gulfstream III | 2001 Avjet Aspen crash |
| N304UE | BAe Jetstream 41 | Atlantic Coast Airlines Flight 6291 |
| N306FE | McDonnell Douglas DC-10-30 | FedEx Express Flight 705 |
| N310EA | Lockheed L-1011-385-1 TriStar | Eastern Air Lines Flight 401 |
| N312RC | McDonnell Douglas MD-82 | Northwest Airlines Flight 255 |
| N315UA | Boeing 737-300 | 2006 O'Hare International Airport runway incursion |
| N3176S | Bell 222 | Airwolf (helicopter) |
| N318SL | Scaled Composites Model 318 | White Knight One |
| N328KF | Spaceplane | SpaceShipOne |
| N334AA | Boeing 767-223ER | American Airlines Flight 11 |
| N334EA | Lockheed L-1011 TriStar | Eastern Air Lines Flight 855 |
| N336ML | Rigid airship | Dragon Dream |
| N339SS | Scaled Composites Model 339 SpaceShipTwo | VSS Enterprise; 2014 Virgin Galactic crash |
| N345HC | McDonnell Douglas DC-10-30ER | Finnair flight AY 915 |
| N347NW | Airbus A320 | Northwest Airlines Flight 188 |
| N348MS | Scaled Composites Model 348 White Knight Two | VMS Eve |
| N350PS | British Aerospace BAe 146-200 | Pacific Southwest Airlines Flight 1771 |
| N351SL | Scaled Composites Stratolaunch | Scaled Composites Stratolaunch |
| N364FE | McDonnell Douglas DC-10-10F | FedEx Express Flight 647 |
| N374NW | Airbus A320-212 | Northwest Airlines Flight 188 |
| N380NE | Fairchild Hiller FH-227 | Northeast Airlines Flight 946 |
| N383EX | De Havilland Canada DHC-6 Twin Otter | Air New England Flight 248 |
| N387SW | Boeing 737-3H4 | Southwest Airlines Flight 2294 |
| N388LS | Learjet 35A | 1996 New Hampshire Learjet crash |
| N388US | Boeing 737-300 | 1991 Los Angeles airport runway collision |
| N394US | Boeing 737-300 | 2005 Logan Airport runway incursion |
| N400AV | Avtek 400A | Avtek 400A |
| N401AM | ATR 72-212 | American Eagle Flight 4184 |
| N401LH | Eurocopter AS350 | 2009 Hudson River mid-air collision |
| N410MA | Bell 412 | 2006 Mercy Air helicopter accident |
| N418MC | Boeing 747-400 | 2006 O'Hare International Airport runway incursion |
| N461US | Boeing 737-401 | USAir Flight 5050 |
| N417PA | Boeing 707-321B | Pan Am Flight 816 |
| N431CA | Bombardier CRJ100 | Comair Flight 191 |
| N438AT | ATR-72-212 | American Eagle Flight 5401 |
| N441KM | Cessna 441 | TWA Flight 427 |
| N446PA | Boeing 707-321B | Pan Am Flight 812 |
| N447T | Canadair CL-44-O | Conroy Skymonster |
| N449A | Martin 4-0-4 | Mohawk Airlines Flight 121 |
| N449QX | Bombardier Dash 8 | 2018 Horizon Air Q400 incident |
| N452DA | Learjet 35A | 2017 Teterboro Learjet crash |
| N454PA | Boeing 707-321B | Pan Am Flight 806 |
| N455A | de Havilland Canada DHC-3 Otter | 2010 de Havilland Canada DHC-3 Otter crash |
| N458US | Fokker F28 | USAir Flight 405 |
| N464M | Martin 4-0-4 | Wichita State University football team plane crash |
| N470EV | Boeing 747-200 | Evergreen 747 Supertanker |
| N471WN | Boeing 737-7H4 | Southwest Airlines Flight 1248 |
| N473DA | Boeing 727 | Delta Air Lines Flight 1141 |
| N479EV | Boeing 747-100 | Evergreen 747 Supertanker |
| N494PA | Boeing 707-321B | Pan Am Flight 217 |
| N501RH | Beechcraft Super King Air | 2004 Martinsville plane crash |
| N513AU | Boeing 737-3B7 | USAir Flight 427 |
| N515NA | Boeing 737 | NASA 515 |
| N526FE | McDonnell Douglas MD-11F | FedEx Express Flight 80 |
| N529B | Boeing B-29A Superfortress | FIFI |
| N52BT | Aérospatiale Gazelle | Blue Thunder (helicopter) |
| N533PS | Boeing 727-214 | PSA Flight 182 |
| N536JB | Airbus A320-232 | JetBlue Airways Flight 292 |
| N551VC | North American P-51D Mustang | Voodoo (aircraft) |
| N554PR | De Havilland DH.114 Heron 2B | Prinair Flight 191 |
| N566AA | McDonnell Douglas MD-83 | American Airlines Flight 1572 |
| N571UP | Boeing 747-44AF | UPS Airlines Flight 6 |
| N577MX | Fairchild SA227-AT Merlin IVC | 2016 Malta Fairchild Merlin crash |
| N589P | Convair 580 | Air Tahoma Flight 185 |
| N591UA | Boeing 757-222 | United Airlines Flight 93 |
| N600XL | Embraer Legacy 600 | Gol Transportes Aéreos Flight 1907 |
| N601JJ | Aero Commander 680 Super | 1971 Colorado Aviation Aero Commander 680 crash |
| N605SK | Airship Industries Skyship 600 | Spirit of Dubai |
| N608FF | Boeing 747-131 | 747 Wing House |
| N611FE | McDonnell Douglas MD-11F | FedEx Express Flight 14 |
| N612UA | Boeing 767-222 | United Airlines Flight 175 |
| N613TV | Eurocopter AS-350 | 2007 Phoenix news helicopter collision |
| N620E | Cessna 620 | Cessna 620 |
| N626TX | Douglas DC-9-14 | Continental Airlines Flight 1713 |
| N632RW | Embraer 170 | United Airlines Flight 3411 |
| N632SW | Boeing 737-3HR | Southwest Airlines Flight 812 |
| N644AA | Boeing 757-223 | American Airlines Flight 77 |
| N651AA | Boeing 757-223 | American Airlines Flight 965 |
| N656PA | Boeing 747-121 | Pan Am Flight 73 |
| N658H | Bell UH-1H Iroquois | 2018 Sapphire Aviation Bell UH-1H Iroquois crash |
| N668SW | Boeing 737-3T5 | Southwest Airlines Flight 1455 |
| N683AV | Fairchild SA227-AC Metro III | 1991 Los Angeles airport runway collision |
| N704AL | Boeing 737 MAX 9 | Alaska Airlines Flight 1282 |
| N709PA | Boeing 707-121 | Pan Am Flight 214 |
| N709PS | Bombardier CRJ701ER | 2025 Potomac River mid-air collision |
| N709Y | Pilgrim 100-B | Pilgrim 100-B N709Y |
| N714NA | Lockheed C-141 Starlifter | Kuiper Airborne Observatory |
| N722BD | Learjet 60 | 2026 Palm Beach County Learjet 60 crash |
| N724US | Boeing 720 | Northwest Orient Airlines Flight 705 |
| N726DA | Lockheed L-1011 | Delta Air Lines Flight 191 |
| N732MA | Boeing 737-81Q | Miami Air Flight 293 |
| N736PA | Boeing 747-121 | Clipper Victor, Tenerife disaster |
| N739PA | Boeing 747-121A | Lockerbie Disaster |
| N740PA | Boeing 747-121 | Pan Am Flight 125 |
| N742TW | Boeing 707 | TWA Flight 159 |
| N744ST | Boeing 747-400 | Evergreen 747 Supertanker |
| N744VG | Boeing 747-41R | Spirit of Mojave |
| N745L | Fairchild F-27 | Bonanza Air Lines Flight 114 |
| N747NA | Boeing 747SP | Stratospheric Observatory for Infrared Astronomy |
| N747PA | Boeing 747-121 | Pan Am Flight 845 |
| N748TW | Boeing 707-131B | 1965 Carmel mid-air collision |
| N752N | Boeing 737-200 | Piedmont Airlines Flight 467 |
| N752PA | Boeing 747-121 | Pan Am Flight 93 |
| N754PA | Boeing 747-121 | Pan Am Flight 830 |
| N757AF | Boeing 757-2J4ER | Donald Trump |
| N761PA | Boeing 707-321B | Pan Am Flight 843 |
| N763A | Douglas DC-3 | R4D-3 05078 (41-20124) |
| N769TW | Boeing 707-300 | TWA Flight 800 (1964) |
| N772SW | Boeing 737-7H4 | Southwest Airlines Flight 1380 |
| N772UA | Boeing 777-222 | United Airlines Flight 328 |
| N776TW | Boeing 707-331B | TWA Flight 840 (1969) |
| N777L | Grumman F8F Bearcat | Rare Bear |
| N778LP | Cessna 172 | Coney Island plane crash |
| N805NA | NASA AD-1 | NASA AD-1 |
| N807FT | Boeing 747-249F | Flying Tiger Line Flight 066 |
| N810TA | Boeing 737-275C | Transair Flight 810 |
| N815D | Douglas DC-7B | Eastern Air Lines Flight 512 |
| N819PH | de Havilland Canada DHC-8-102 | Horizon Air Flight 2658 |
| N820NW | Airbus A330-300 | Northwest Airlines Flight 253 |
| N821TW | Convair 880 | TWA Flight 128 |
| N823KD | Bombardier Challenger 604 | Hop-A-Jet Flight 823 |
| N833NA | Boeing 720 | Controlled Impact Demonstration |
| N836D | Douglas DC-7B | N836D DC-7B |
| N840TW | Boeing 727-31 | TWA Flight 841 (1979) |
| N844AA | Boeing 727-223 | 2003 Boeing 727-223 disappearance |
| N849D | Douglas DC-7B | Eastern Air Lines Flight 663 |
| N872RW | Embraer 170 Regional Jet | 2007 San Francisco International Airport runway incursion |
| N875JX | BAe Jetstream 32 | Corporate Airlines Flight 5966 |
| N900SA | McDonnell Douglas DC-9 | 2006 Mexico DC-9 drug bust |
| N903WA | McDonnell Douglas DC-10-10 | Western Airlines Flight 2605 |
| N904VJ | McDonnell Douglas DC-9-32 | ValuJet Flight 592 |
| N905NA | Boeing 747-100 | Shuttle Carrier Aircraft |
| N908AR | Boeing 747-400 | Sky Lease Cargo Flight 4854 |
| N909DL | McDonnell Douglas MD-88 | Delta Air Lines Flight 1086 |
| N911NA | Boeing 747-100 | Shuttle Carrier Aircraft |
| N912FJ | British Aerospace Jetstream 32 | Aerocaribe Flight 7831 |
| N927DA | McDonnell Douglas MD-88 | Delta Air Lines Flight 1288 |
| N928J | Grumman HU-16 Albatross | Hemisphere Dancer |
| N929CD | Cirrus SR20 | 2006 New York City plane crash |
| N932XJ | Bombardier CRJ900 | Delta Connection Flight 4819 |
| N937F | Douglas DC-9-33CF | ALM Flight 980 |
| N949CA | Boeing 747-428(BCF) | National Airlines Flight 102 |
| N950JW | McDonnell Douglas DC-8-63CF | Arrow Air Flight 1285 |
| N954VJ | McDonnell Douglas DC-9 | US Airways Flight 1016 |
| N964U | McDonnell Douglas MD-82 | TWA Flight 427 |
| N963AS | McDonnell Douglas MD-83 | Alaska Airlines Flight 261 |
| N975NE | McDonnell Douglas DC-9-31 | Delta Air Lines Flight 723 |
| N977AN | Boeing 737-823 | American Airlines Flight 331 |
| N988VJ | McDonnell Douglas DC-9-31 | Allegheny Airlines Flight 853 |
| N990XB | Boom XB-1 | Boom XB-1 |
| N994Z | McDonnell Douglas DC-9-31 | Ozark Air Lines Flight 650 |
| N999B | Douglas DC-3 | 1955 Cincinnati mid-air collision |
| N999LJ | Learjet 60 | 2008 South Carolina Learjet 60 crash |
| N999UA | Boeing 737-291 | United Airlines Flight 585 |
| N1063T | McDonnell Douglas DC-9-15 | TWA Flight 553 |
| N1116J | BAC One Eleven 204AF | Mohawk Airlines Flight 40 |
| N1127D | Beechcraft King Air | United Express Flight 5925 |
| N1217A | Boeing 767-375 | Atlas Air Flight 3591 |
| N1244N | Curtiss C-46 Commando | Cal Poly football team C-46 crash |
| N1335U | McDonnell Douglas DC-9-31 | Southern Airways Flight 242 |
| N1553 | BAC One-Eleven-203AE | Braniff Flight 250 |
| N1809E | Douglas DC-8 | Surinam Airways Flight 764 |
| N1819U | McDonnell Douglas DC-10-10 | United Airlines Flight 232 |
| N1963 | Boeing 727 | American Airlines Flight 625 |
| N1996 | Boeing 727-123 | American Airlines Flight 383 |
| N1997A | Boeing 767-33AER (BDSF) | 21 Air Flight 7598 |
| N2371N | Cessna 172 | 2002 Tampa plane crash |
| N2469L | Kubicek BB85Z | 2016 Lockhart hot air balloon crash |
| N2520B | Lockheed L-049-45 Constellation | Avion Pirata |
| N2770R | Fairchild F-27A | Pacific Air Lines Flight 773 |
| N2889D | Piper Cherokee | 2010 Austin plane crash |
| N2969 | Grumman G-73T Turbine Mallard | Chalk's Ocean Airways Flight 101 |
| N2969G | Boeing 727-100 | Alaska Airlines Flight 1866 |
| N3054V | Douglas C-54D | 2024 Alaska Air Fuel Douglas C-54 crash |
| N3305L | McDonnell Douglas DC-9 | Delta Air Lines Flight 9570 |
| N3313L | McDonnell Douglas DC-9-14 | Northwest Airlines Flight 1482 |
| N3323L | McDonnell Douglas DC-9 | Delta Air Lines Flight 516 |
| N3456M | Bell 206 | Bill Graham helicopter crash |
| N3520R | Beechcraft Musketeer | 1990 Daniel Johnston plane crash |
| N3601V | Cessna 150M | 2015 Moncks Corner mid-air collision |
| N3710G | Douglas A-26 Invader | 1980 Biggin Hill Invader crash |
| N3794N | Beechcraft Bonanza | The Day the Music Died |
| N3911Z | Bell 206L-1 LongRanger II | Spirit of Texas |
| N4453 | Grumman Widgeon | De plane! De plane! |
| N4476W | Piper PA-28 Cherokee | Oklahoma State Cowgirls basketball team plane crash |
| N4522V | Boeing 747SP | China Airlines Flight 006 |
| N4713U | Boeing 747-122 | United Airlines Flight 811 |
| N4735 | Boeing 727-235 | Pan Am Flight 759 |
| N4744 | Boeing 727-235 | National Airlines Flight 193 |
| N4891C | Douglas DC-7B | National Airlines Flight 967 |
| N4891F | Piper PA-28-181 | Aeroméxico Flight 498 |
| N4904 | Fairchild F-27B | Wien Air Alaska Flight 99 |
| N4905 | Fairchild F-27B | Wien Consolidated Airlines Flight 55 |
| N5046K | Douglas DC-6 | Pan Am Clipper Panama |
| N5532 | Lockheed L-188 Electra | Galaxy Airlines Flight 203 |
| N5533 | Lockheed L-188 Electra | Eastern Air Lines Flight 375 |
| N5410V | North American P-51D Mustang | Dago Red |
| N6004C | Lockheed L-749A Constellation | TWA Flight 903 |
| N6101A | Lockheed L-188A Electra | American Airlines Flight 320 |
| N6127V | Beechcraft Baron | TWA Flight 553 |
| N6218C | Lockheed Super Constellation | 1965 Carmel mid-air collision |
| N6324C | Douglas DC-7 | 1956 Grand Canyon mid-air collision |
| N6328C | Douglas DC-7 | United Airlines Flight 736 |
| N6383 | De Havilland Canada DHC-6 Twin Otter | Golden West Airlines Flight 261 |
| N6642L | Piper PA-31 Navajo | Comair Flight 444 |
| N6645Y | Piper PA 23-350 Aztec | Graham Hill; Tony Brise; 1975 Grand Prix (Bahamas) Ltd Piper PA-23 Aztec crash |
| N6902C | Lockheed 1049 Super Constellation | 1956 Grand Canyon mid-air collision |
| N6907C | Lockheed 1049 Super Constellation | 1960 New York air disaster |
| N6915C | Lockheed Constellation | Flying Tiger Line Flight 282 |
| N6921C | Lockheed 1049 Super Constellation | Flying Tiger Line Flight 739 |
| N7000P | Piper PA-24-250 Comanche | 1963 Camden PA-24 crash |
| N7030U | Boeing 727-22 | United Airlines Flight 227 |
| N7036U | Boeing 727-22 | United Airlines Flight 389 |
| N7201U | Boeing 720B | "The Starship" |
| N7217L | Beechcraft Model 99 | L'Express Airlines Flight 508 |
| N7224U | Boeing 720-022 | Caesar's Chariot |
| N7227C | Boeing B-17G-95-DL Flying Fortress | Texas Raiders |
| N7231T | Boeing 707-331B | Independent Air Flight 1851 |
| N7374J | Piper Cherokee | Allegheny Airlines Flight 853 |
| N7405 | Vickers Viscount | United Airlines Flight 823 |
| N7430 | Vickers Viscount | United Airlines Flight 297 |
| N7434U | Boeing 727-22C | United Airlines Flight 266 |
| N7430 | Vickers Viscount 745D | United Airlines Flight 297 |
| N7437 | Vickers Viscount | Capital Airlines Flight 67 |
| N7462 | Vickers Viscount | Capital Airlines Flight 20 |
| N7463 | Vickers Viscount | Capital Airlines Flight 75 |
| N7502A | Boeing 707-123 | American Airlines Flight 1502 |
| N7506A | Boeing 707-123 | American Airlines Flight 1 (1962) |
| N7520C | Consolidated PB4Y-2 Privateer | 2002 airtanker crashes |
| N7711G | Cessna 172 | PSA Flight 182 |
| N7742B | Boeing 737-7BD | |
| N7811M | Fairchild Hiller FH-227B | Mohawk Airlines Flight 411 |
| N7818M | Fairchild Hiller FH-227B | Mohawk Airlines Flight 405 |
| N8031U | Douglas DC-8 | 1960 New York air disaster |
| N8040U | McDonnell Douglas DC-8-20 | United Airlines Flight 859 |
| N8047U | McDonnell Douglas DC-8-54AF | United Airlines Flight 2860 |
| N8082U | McDonnell Douglas DC-8-61 | United Airlines Flight 173 |
| N8210H | Douglas DC-7B | Pacoima aircraft accident |
| N8225H | Douglas DC-6B | National Airlines Flight 2511 |
| N8396A | Bombardier CRJ-200 | Pinnacle Airlines Flight 3701 |
| N8607 | Douglas DC-8 | Eastern Air Lines Flight 304 |
| N8631 | Douglas DC-8 Super 63CF | Seaboard World Airlines Flight 253A |
| N8715T | Boeing 707-300 | TWA Flight 741 |
| N8734 | Boeing 707-300 | TWA Flight 841 (1974) |
| N8845E | Boeing 727-225 | Eastern Air Lines Flight 66 |
| N8972M | Beechcraft Debonair | Jim Reeves |
| N8984E | Douglas DC-9-31 | Eastern Air Lines Flight 212 |
| N9031U | Boeing 737-222 | United Airlines Flight 553 |
| N90670 | Convair CV-240 | Northeast Airlines Flight 258 |
| N90944 | Boeing 377-10-26 Stratocruiser | Pan Am Flight 7 |
| N9101 | Douglas DC-9-14 | West Coast Airlines Flight 956 |
| N9253N | Piper PA-32R-301, Saratoga II | John F. Kennedy Jr. Piper Saratoga crash |
| N9345 | McDonnell Douglas DC-9-31 | Hughes Airwest Flight 706 |
| N9705C | Lockheed L-188 Electra | Braniff Flight 542 |
| N9707C | Lockheed L-188 Electra | Braniff Flight 352 |
| N11002 | Lockheed L-1011 TriStar | TWA Flight 843 |
| N11421 | Cessna 150 | Golden West Airlines Flight 261 |
| N13954 | Boeing 787-9 | Air Canada Flight 759 |
| N14053 | Airbus A300-600 | American Airlines Flight 587 |
| N15520 | Douglas DC-3 | Hawthorne Nevada Airlines Flight 708 |
| N16933 | Bell 206 | Death of Stevie Ray Vaughan |
| N17105 | Boeing 757-224 | Continental Airlines Flight 1883 |
| N18611 | Boeing 737-524 | Continental Airlines Flight 1404 |
| N29508 | Taylorcraft BL-65 | Trevor Jacob |
| N29961 | Boeing 787-9 | Air Canada Flight 759 |
| N30061 | Douglas DC-4 | 1961 Cincinnati Zantop DC-4 crash |
| N30062 | Douglas DC-4 | United Airlines Flight 409 |
| N33701 | Embraer EMB 120RT Brasilia | Continental Express Flight 2574 |
| N34954 | Douglas DC-6A | Northeast Airlines Flight 823 |
| N37516 | Douglas DC-6B | 1955 MacArthur Airport United Airlines crash |
| N37550 | Douglas DC-6B | United Airlines Flight 615 |
| N37559 | Douglas DC-6B | United Airlines Flight 629 |
| N40403 | Martin 4-0-4 | TWA Flight 400 |
| N40416 | Martin 4-0-4 | TWA Flight 260 |
| N51071 | Douglas DC-3 | Air Indiana Flight 216 |
| N54328 | Boeing 727-231 | TWA Flight 514 |
| N54350 | Boeing 727-231 | TWA Flight 840 (1986) |
| N54629 | McDonnell Douglas DC-10-30 | UTA Flight 772 |
| N62895 | Boeing 737-900ER | Air Canada Flight 759 |
| N64399 | Boeing 727-231 | TWA Flight 847 |
| N68650 | Boeing 727-22 | Piedmont Airlines Flight 22 |
| N69030 | Douglas C-47 Skytrain (conversion) | Douglas XCG-17 |
| N70700 | Boeing 367-80 | Boeing 367-80 |
| N70755 | Boeing 707 | Continental Airlines Flight 11 |
| N70773 | Boeing 707 | Continental Airlines Flight 12 |
| N73711 | Boeing 737-297 | Aloha Airlines Flight 243 |
| N74608 | Boeing 377 Stratocruiser 10-30 | Northwest Orient Airlines Flight 2 |
| N75356 | Boeing 737-3T0 | TACA Flight 110 |
| N75432 | Boeing 737-924(ER) | |
| N79111 | North American P-51D Mustang (modified) | The Galloping Ghost (aircraft) |
| N86504 | Lockheed L-049 Constellation | Paradise Airlines Flight 901A |
| N87701 | Bell UH-1B Iroquois | Twilight Zone tragedy |
| N88705 | Boeing 727-200 | Tan-Sahsa Flight 414 |
| N88727 | Douglas DC-4 | Eastern Air Lines Flight 537 |
| N88846 | Lockheed L-049 Constellation | Pan Am Flight 151 |
| N88899 | Douglas DC-4 | Pan Am Flight 526A |
| N90728 | Douglas DC-6 | American Airlines Flight 157 |
| N90750 | Douglas DC-6 | American Airlines Flight 910 |
| N90773 | Douglas DC-6 | 1961 President Airlines Douglas DC-6 crash |
| N90943 | Boeing 377 Stratocruiser 10-29 | Pan Am Flight 6 |
| N90944 | Boeing 377 Stratocruiser 10-29 | Pan Am Flight 7 |
| N93012 | Boeing B-17G Flying Fortress | Nine-O-Nine, 2019 Boeing B-17 Flying Fortress crash |
| N93050 | Martin 2-0-2 | Northwest Orient Airlines Flight 307 |
| N93119 | Boeing 747-131 | TWA Flight 800 |
| N93211 | Martin 2-0-2A | 1955 Cincinnati mid-air collision |
| N94230 | Convair 600 | Texas International Airlines Flight 655 |
| N94255 | Convair 240 | American Airlines Flight 723 |
| N95425 | Douglas DC-4 | Northwest Orient Airlines Flight 2501 |
| NC999E | Fokker F.10 | 1931 Transcontinental & Western Air Fokker F-10 crash |
| NC1946 | Douglas DC-3-382 | TWA Flight 3 |
| NC13304 | Boeing 247 | United Airlines Chesterton Crash |
| NC13315 | Boeing 247B | Western Air Express Flight 7 |
| NC13317 | Boeing 247 | United Airlines Cheyenne Crash |
| NC13323 | Boeing 247D | United Airlines Cheyenne Test Crash |
| NC13355 | Boeing 247D | United Airlines Trip 34 |
| NC13721 | Douglas DC-2-112 | TWA Flight 1 |
| NC13789 | Douglas DC-2 | 1938 Yosemite TWA crash |
| NC14274 | Douglas DC-2-120 | American Airlines Flight 1 (1936) |
| NC14714 | Martin M-130 | Hawaii Clipper |
| NC14715 | Martin M-130 | Pan Am Flight 1104 |
| NC14716 | Martin M-130 | China Clipper |
| NC16002 | Douglas DC-3DST-144 | NC16002 disappearance |
| NC16008 | Douglas DC-3-178 | American Airlines Flight 63 (Flagship Missouri) |
| NC16014 | Douglas DC-3-178 | American Airlines Flight 63 (Flagship Ohio) |
| NC16022 | Lockheed Model 10 Electra | Chicago and Southern Flight 4 |
| NC16724 | Sikorsky S-42 | Samoan Clipper |
| NC16933 | Sikorsky S-43B | 1939 Pan Am Sikorsky S-43 crash |
| NC17388 | Lockheed 14H Super Electra | Northwest Airlines Flight 2 |
| NC17389 | Lockheed 14H Super Electra | Northwest Airlines Flight 1 |
| NC18199 | Lockheed 18-50 Lodestar | National Airlines Flight 16 |
| NC18601 | Boeing 314 | Honolulu Clipper |
| NC18602 | Boeing 314 | Pacific Clipper |
| NC21767 | Douglas DC-3-277A | American Airlines Flight 2 |
| NC21786 | Douglas DC-3-393 | Pennsylvania Central Airlines Flight 105 |
| NC21789 | Douglas DC-3 | Lovettsville air disaster |
| NC25647 | Douglas DC-3 | Eastern Airlines Flight 45 |
| NC25663 | Douglas DC-3 | American Airlines Flight 1 (1941) |
| NC28394 | Douglas DC-3 | Eastern Air Lines Flight 21 |
| NC30046 | Douglas DC-4 | United Airlines Flight 521 |
| NC36480 | Douglas C-47 Skytrain | Deportee (Plane Wreck at Los Gatos) |
| NC37506 | Douglas DC-6 | United Airlines Flight 624 |
| NC37510 | Douglas DC-6 | United Airlines Flight 608 |
| NC37543 | Douglas DC-6 | United Airlines Flight 610 |
| NC86513 | Lockheed L-049 Constellation | TWA Flight 513 |
| NC88845 | Lockheed L-049 Constellation | Pan Am Flight 121 |
| NC88920 | Douglas DC-4 | Pan Am Flight 923 |
| NC93044 | Martin 2-0-2 | Northwest Airlines Flight 421 |
| NC95422 | Douglas C-54G-1-DO | Northwest Airlines Flight 4422 |
| NL7715C | North American P-51D Mustang | Red Baron (racer) |
| NR211 | Lockheed Model 8 Sirius | Tingmissartoq |
| NR258Y | Hughes H-1 Racer | Howard Hughes |
| NR6683 | Bellanca CH-300 Pacemaker | Lituanica |
| NR761W | Bellanca CH-300 | Cape Cod (aircraft) |
| NR796W | Bellanca CH-400 or Bellanca J-300 | Miss Veedol |
| NX206 | Fokker C-2 | America (aircraft) |
| NX211 | Ryan NYP | Spirit of St. Louis |
| NX703 | Fokker F.VII | Old Glory |
| NX18100 | Douglas DC-4E | Douglas DC-4E |
| NX26927 | Lockheed P-38L-5-LO Lightning | Eastern Air Lines Flight 537 |
| NX28996 | Vought-Sikorsky VS-300 | Vought-Sikorsky VS-300 |
| NX37602 | Hughes H-4 Hercules | "Spruce Goose" |
| NX3902 | Thaden T-1 | Thaden T-1 |
| NX18973 | Lockheed Model 14 Super Electra | Howard Hughes |
| NX79111 | North American P-51D Mustang | 2011 Reno Air Races crash |
| NX90521 | Beechcraft Model 34 | Beechcraft Model 34 |

=== Vanuatu ===
| Tail number | Description | Related article |
| YJ-AL2 | Britten-Norman Islander | Air Vanuatu Flight 241 |
| YJ-AV71 | ATR-72 | Air Vanuatu Flight 241 |
| YJ-OO9 | Britten-Norman Islander | Air Vanuatu Flight 241 |

=== Venezuela ===
| Tail number | Description | Related article |
| YV-C-AVD | McDonnell Douglas DC-9-30 | Viasa Flight 742 |
| YV-C-AVM | McDonnell Douglas DC-9-14 | Avensa Flight 358 |
| YV-C-EVH | Fairchild F-27 | 1962 Avensa Fairchild F-27 accident |
| YV-23C | McDonnell Douglas DC-9 | Aeropostal Alas de Venezuela Flight 108 |
| YV-45C | Hawker Siddeley HS 748 | 1978 Línea Aeropostal Venezolana Hawker Siddeley HS 748 accident |
| YV-67C | Douglas DC-9 | 1983 Avensa Douglas DC-9 crash |
| YV102T | Boeing 737-291 Advanced | 2008 Conviasa Boeing 737 crash |
| YV1010 | ATR 42-320 | Conviasa Flight 2350 |
| YV1449 | ATR 42-300 | Santa Bárbara Airlines Flight 518 |
| YV2081 | Let L-410 Turbolet | 2008 Los Roques archipelago Transaven Let L-410 crash |

=== Vietnam ===
| Tail number | Description | Related article |
| VN-A120 | Tupolev Tu-134 | Vietnam Airlines Flight 815 |
| VN-A449 | Yakovlev Yak-40 | Vietnam Airlines Flight 474 |
| XV-NJC | Boeing 727-121C | Air Vietnam Flight 706 |

=== Yemen ===
| Tail number | Description | Related article |
| 7O-ADJ | Airbus A310-324 | Yemenia Flight 626 |

=== Yugoslavia ===
| Tail number | Description | Related article |
| YU-AHR | McDonnell Douglas DC-9 | EgyptAir Flight 763 |
| YU-AHT | McDonnell Douglas DC-9-32 | JAT Flight 367 |
| YU-AHZ | Tupolev Tu-134A | Aviogenex Flight 130 |
| YU-AJH | McDonnell Douglas DC-9-32 | Sosoliso Airlines Flight 1145 |
| YU-AJO | McDonnell Douglas DC-9-31 | Inex-Adria Aviopromet Flight 450 |
| YU-AJR | McDonnell Douglas DC-9-31 | 1976 Zagreb mid-air collision |
| YU-ANA | McDonnell Douglas MD-82 | Inex-Adria Aviopromet Flight 1308 |

=== Zimbabwe ===
| Tail number | Description | Related article |
| Z-BAV | McDonnell Douglas MD-11F | Avient Aviation Flight 324 |

== See also ==
- Aircraft registration
- Call sign
