= Aviation Traders Accountant =

ATL-90 Accountant
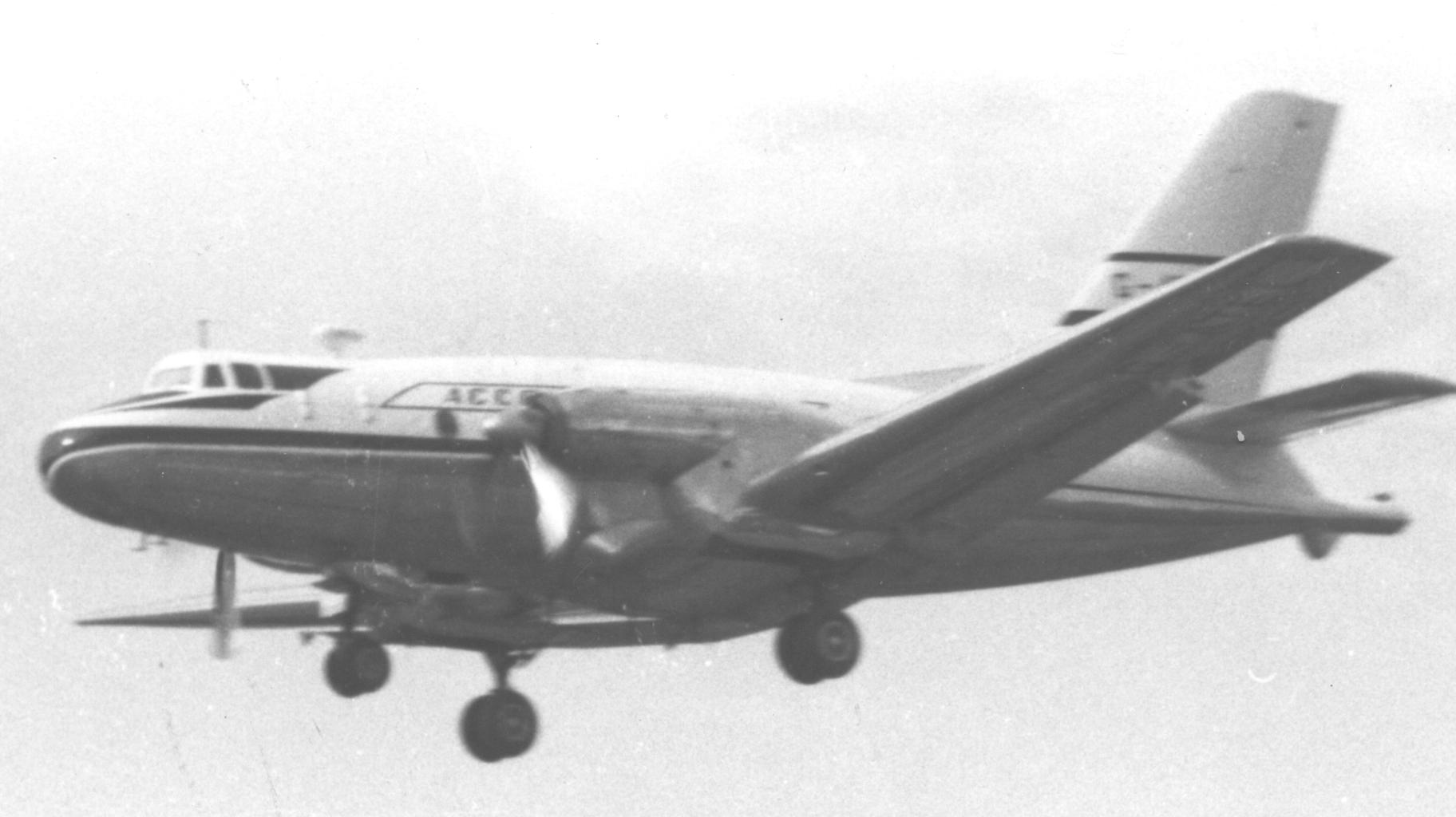
- The Aviation Traders Accountant at the September 1957 Farnborough SBAC Show

General information
- Type: Medium-range airliner
- Manufacturer: Aviation Traders
- Status: Scrapped
- Number built: 1

History
- First flight: 9 July 1957
- Retired: 1958

The Aviation Traders ATL-90 Accountant was a 1950s British twin-engined 28-passenger turboprop airliner built at Southend Airport England by Aviation Traders, a member of the airline and aircraft engineering group controlled by Freddie Laker.

== History ==
The ATL-90 Accountant was a turboprop airliner designed as a replacement for the Douglas DC-3. It was powered by two Rolls-Royce Dart turboprops and first flew from Southend on 9 July 1957. The only Accountant, initially flown using the test serial G-41-1, but quickly registered G-ATEL, was displayed at the Farnborough Airshow in September 1957 but did not attract much commercial interest. The aircraft last flew on 10 January 1958, development was abandoned and the aircraft was scrapped in February 1960.

== Specifications (Accountant I) ==
General characteristics

- Crew: 2
- Length: 62 ft 1 in (18.93 m)
- Wingspan: 82 ft 6 in (25.15 m)
- Height: 25 ft 3 in (7.70 m)
- Wing area: 632 sq ft (58.71 m^{2})
- Empty weight: 16,961 lb (7,693 kg)
- Max takeoff weight: 32,000 lb (14,512 kg)
- Powerplant: 2 × Rolls-Royce Dart turboprop, 1,730 hp (1,291 kW) each

Performance

- Maximum speed: 295 mph (470 km/h, 256 kn)
- Range: 2,070 mi (3,364 km, 1,800 nmi)

== See also ==
Aircraft of comparable role, configuration, and era

- Avro 748

Related lists

- List of airliners

== Bibliography ==
- The Illustrated Encyclopedia of Aircraft (Part Work 1982-1985). Orbis Publishing.
- Jackson, A.J. (1974). British Civil Aircraft since 1919. London: Putnam. ISBN 0-370-10014-X.
- McCloud, Murdo (May–June 2004). "Attacking the Bottom Line: Aviation Trader's Accountant". Air Enthusiast. No. 111. p. 31. ISSN 0143-5450.
- Winchester, Jim (2005). The World's Worst Aircraft. New York: Amber Books. ISBN 0-7607-8714-X.
