= United Airlines fleet =

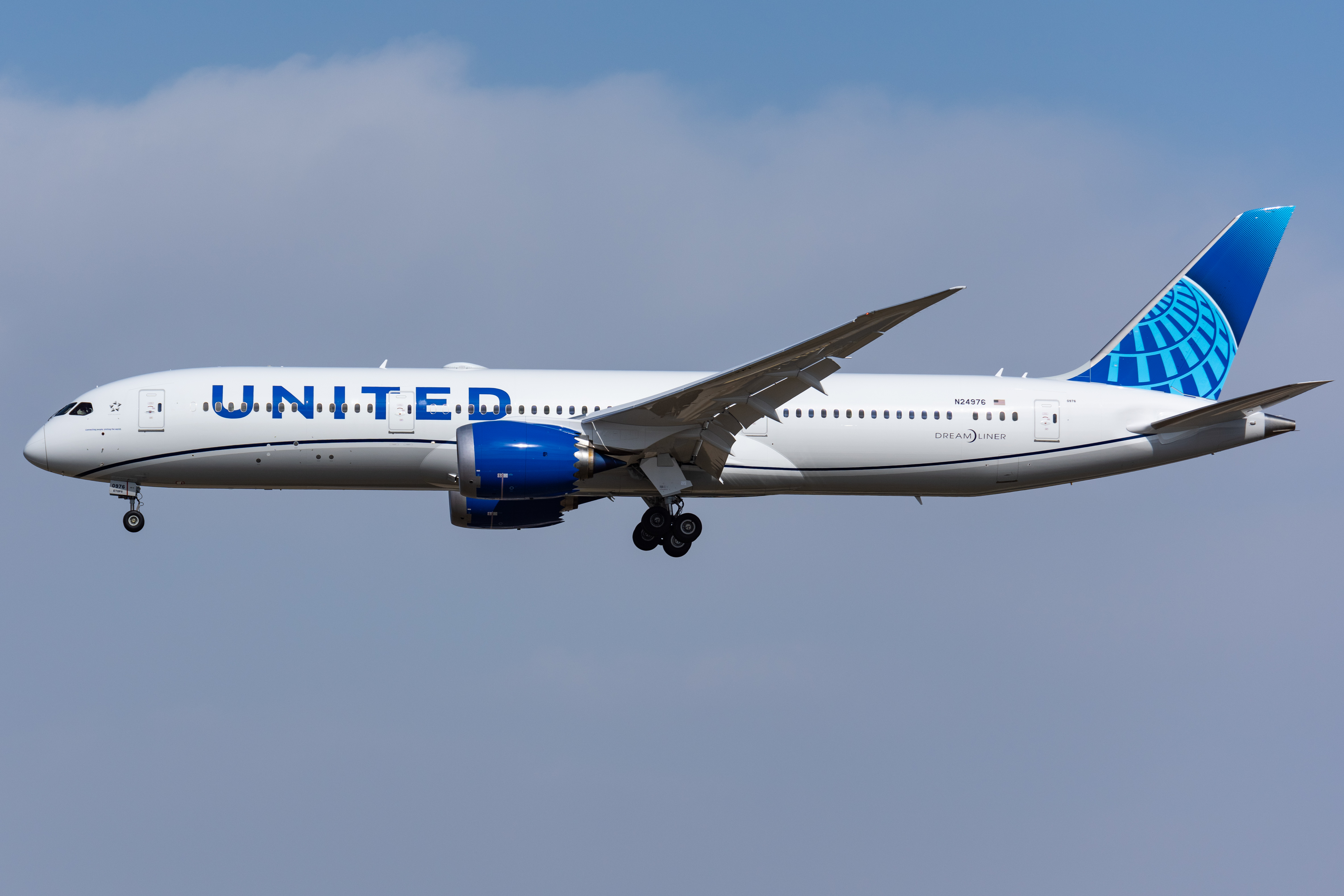
United Airlines Boeing 787-9 in the most recent livery in 2020

As of November 2026, the United Airlines fleet consists of 1,152 mainline aircraft, the largest of any airline worldwide. United Airlines operates a mix of narrow-body aircraft from Airbus and Boeing and an all Boeing wide-body fleet, with more wide-bodies than any other North American passenger airline. The average age of United's fleet is 14.7 years.

== Strategy ==
The "United Next" strategy introduced during the COVID-19 pandemic is United Airlines' plan to modernize and expand its fleet while enhancing operational efficiency and the passenger experience. Unlike other major U.S. airlines, United retained its wide-body aircraft during the pandemic, allowing the airline to meet the surge in travel demand, especially internationally as recovery progressed.

Since 2021, United has placed orders for over 500 various narrow-body jets and 150 wide-body Boeing 787 Dreamliner jets as part of its strategy, which also includes retiring older mainline aircraft and at least 200 single-class regional jets.

The strategy emphasizes improving the passenger experience. United's "Signature Interior" concept features seatback entertainment systems with Bluetooth connectivity, power outlets at every seat, and larger overhead bins designed to accommodate a roller bag for each passenger. All new aircraft will include the updated interior, with retrofitting of existing mainline aircraft. United has also selected SpaceX's Starlink as its in-flight internet connectivity provider for mainline and two-class regional aircraft. This high-speed, low-latency satellite internet service will enable live streaming, cloud-based work applications, and gaming with complimentary access provided to all passengers.

United Airlines has also invested in and secured options for several aircraft under development. These include options to purchase 100 eVTOL (electric vertical takeoff and landing) aircraft from Archer Aviation and 200 eVTOL aircraft from Eve Air Mobility, a division of Embraer. Furthermore, the airline has committed to purchasing 100 ES-30 electric turboprop regional aircraft from Heart Aerospace, with options to purchase up to 50 more. United has also committed to purchasing 15 Boom Overture supersonic aircraft, with options to purchase up to 35 more.

== Fleet ==
As of November 2026, United Airlines operates the following mainline aircraft:

United Airlines fleet
Aircraft	In service	Orders	Passengers							Notes
Aircraft	In service	Orders	J	F	W	Y+	Y	Total	Refs	Notes
Airbus A319-100	64	—	—	12	—	36	78	126		To be retired by 2030.
Airbus A320-200	61	—	—	12	—	42	96	150		To be retired by 2030.
Airbus A321neo	76	55	—	20	—	57	123	200		Deliveries until 2032.
Airbus A321neo	1	49	20	—	12	57	93	161		Coastliner configuration.
Airbus A321XLR	3	47	20	—	12	36	82	150		Replacing Boeing 757-200.
Airbus A350-900	—	45	TBA							Deliveries delayed until at least 2028 due to dispute with engine supplier Rolls-Royce.
Boeing 737-700	40	—	—	12	—	36	78	126		
Boeing 737-800	141	—	—	16	—	54	96	166		
Boeing 737-900	12	—	—	20	—	45	114	179		
Boeing 737-900ER	136	—	—	20	—	45	114	179		
Boeing 737 MAX 8	123	—	—	16	—	54	96	166		
Boeing 737 MAX 8	123	—	—	14	—	54	96	164		Guam-based configuration.
Boeing 737 MAX 9	188	36	—	20	—	45	114	179		Largest operator.
Boeing 737 MAX 10	—	167	—	20	—	64	105	189		Deliveries to begin in 2027.
Boeing 737 MAX 10	—	167	22	—	—	45	96	163		Deliveries to begin in 2027.
Boeing 757-200	40	—	16	—	—	42	118	176		To be replaced by Airbus A321XLR.
Boeing 757-300	21	—	—	24	—	54	156	234		Largest operator.
Boeing 767-300ER	13	—	30	—	24	32	113	199		
Boeing 767-300ER	24	—	46	—	22	43	56	167		
Boeing 767-400ER	16	—	34	—	24	48	125	231		
Boeing 777-200	19	—	—	28	—	102	234	364		Launch customer and largest operator. Domestic configuration.
Boeing 777-200ER	4	—	—	32	—	124	206	362		Domestic configuration.
Boeing 777-200ER	51	—	50	—	24	46	156	276		International configuration.
Boeing 777-300ER	22	—	60	—	24	62	204	350		
Boeing 787-8	12	—	28	—	21	36	158	243		
Boeing 787-9	48	—	48	—	21	39	149	257		
Boeing 787-9	16	78	64	—	35	33	90	222		Polaris Elevated configuration. 50 options.
Boeing 787-10	21	56	44	—	21	54	199	318		Orders converted from 787-9. Deliveries begin in 2028.
Total	1,152	533								

=== Gallery ===
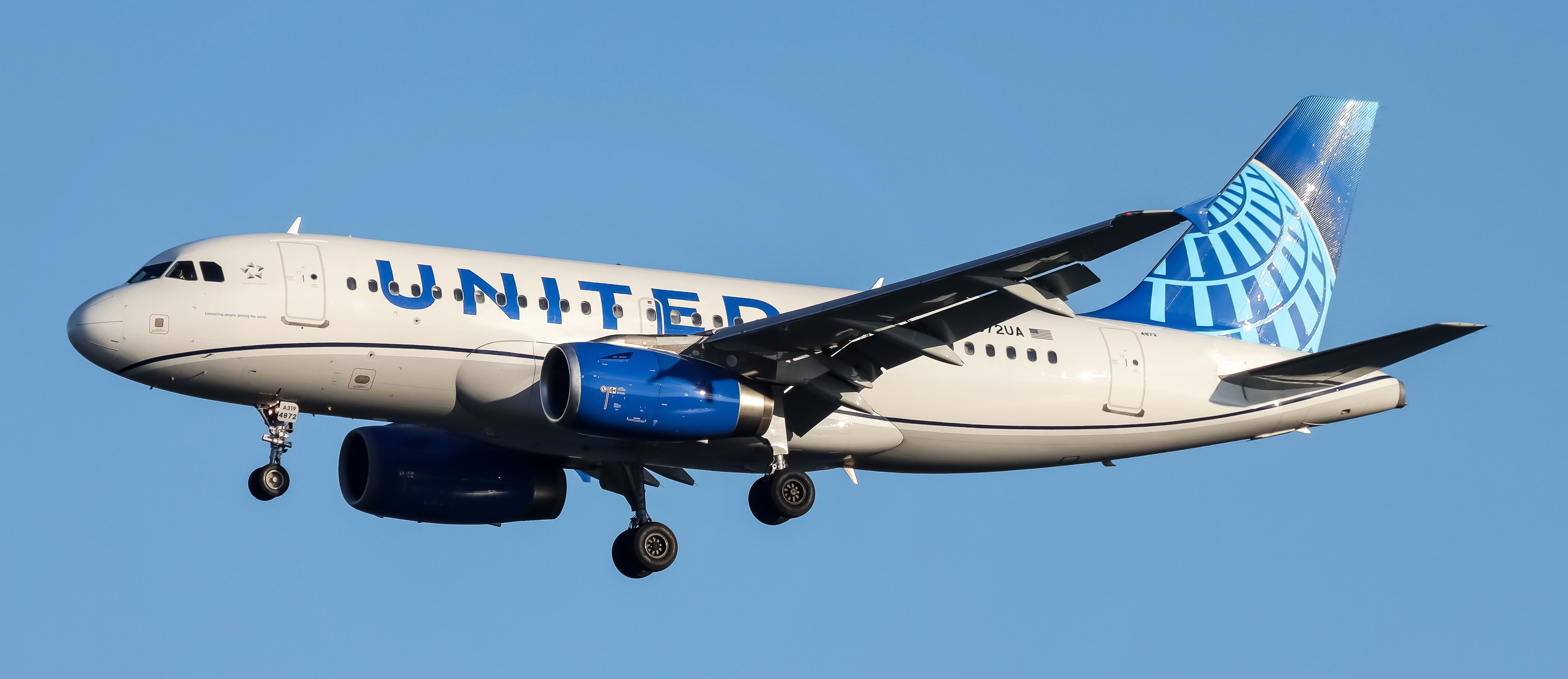
Airbus A319-100

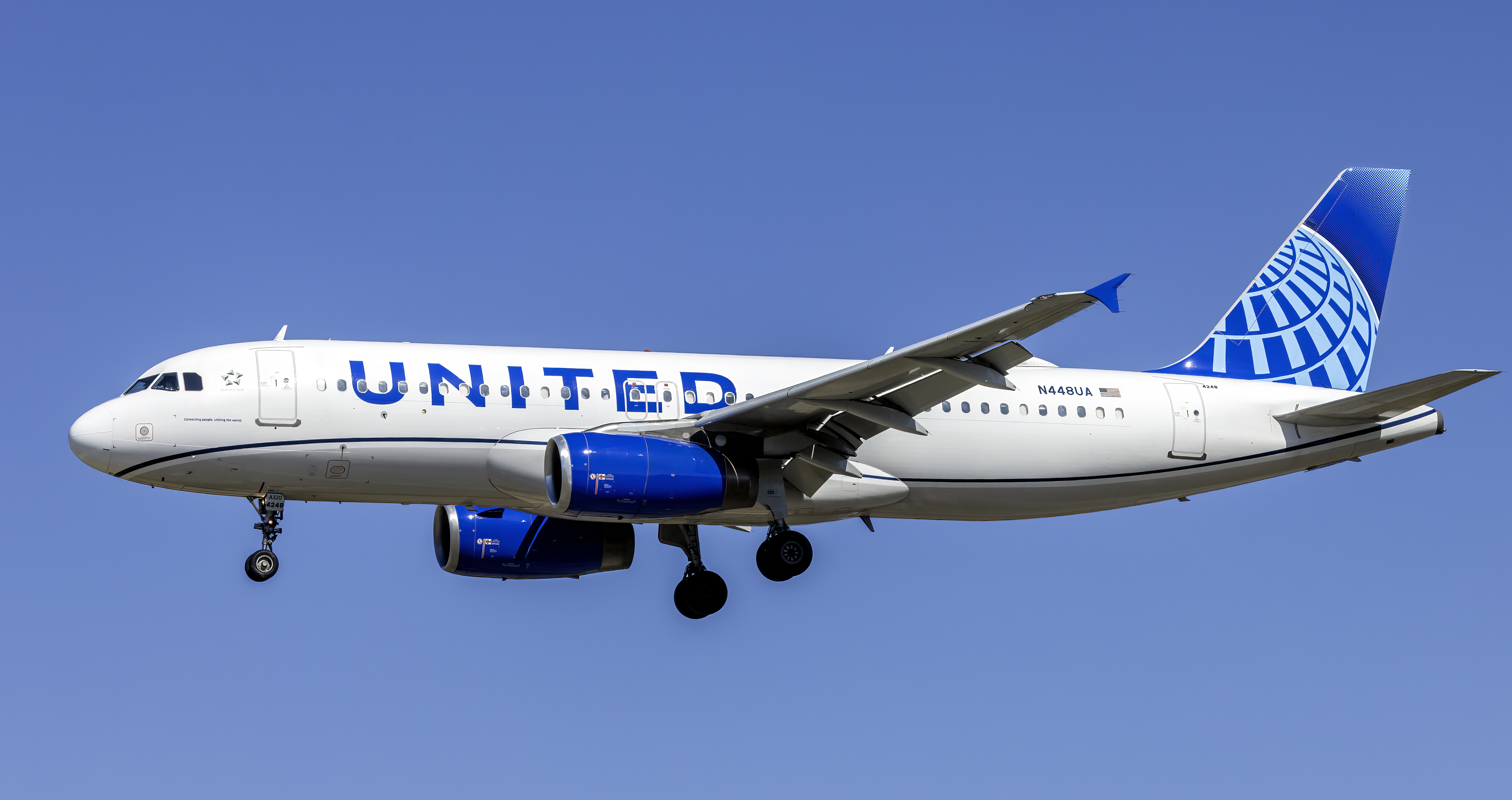
Airbus A320-200

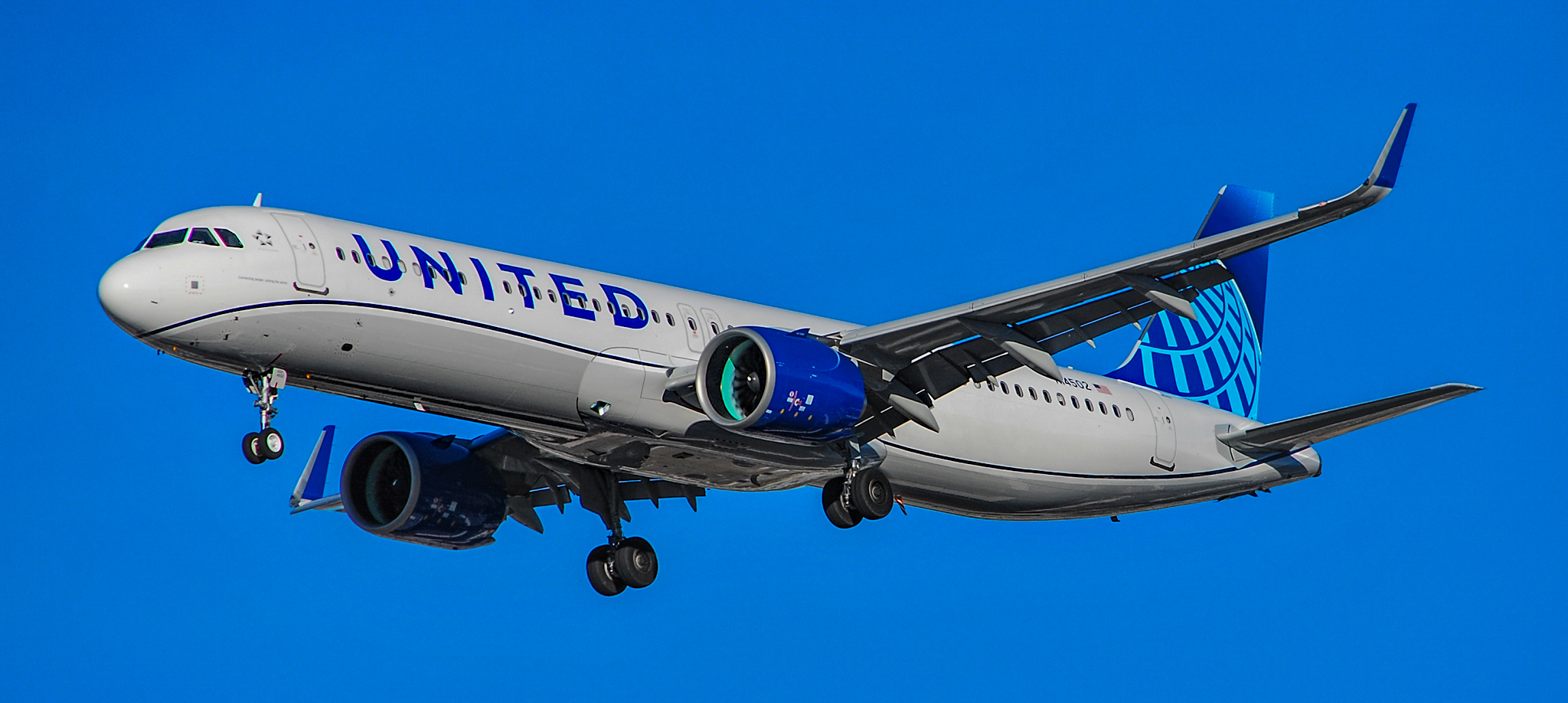
Airbus A321neo

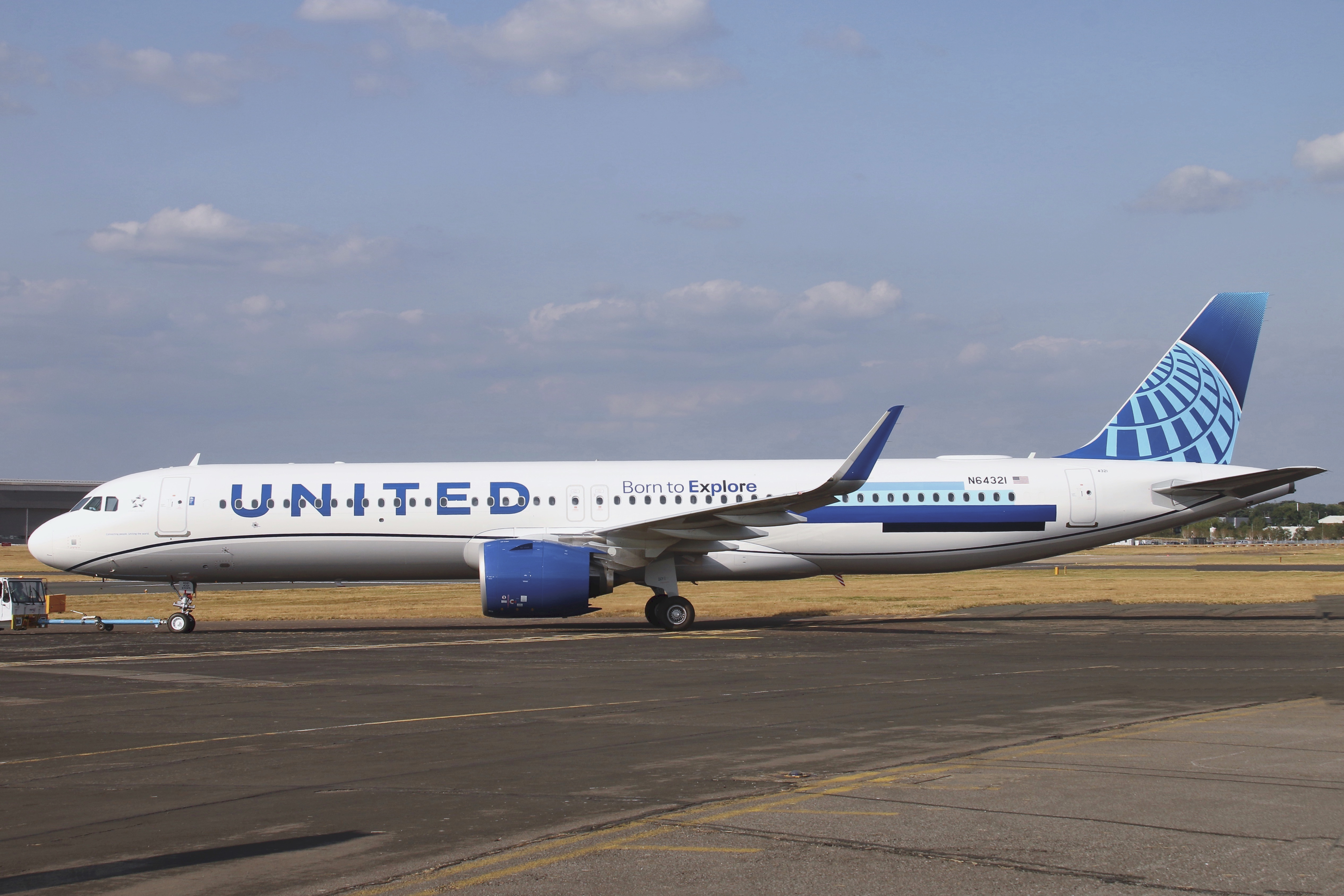
Airbus A321XLR

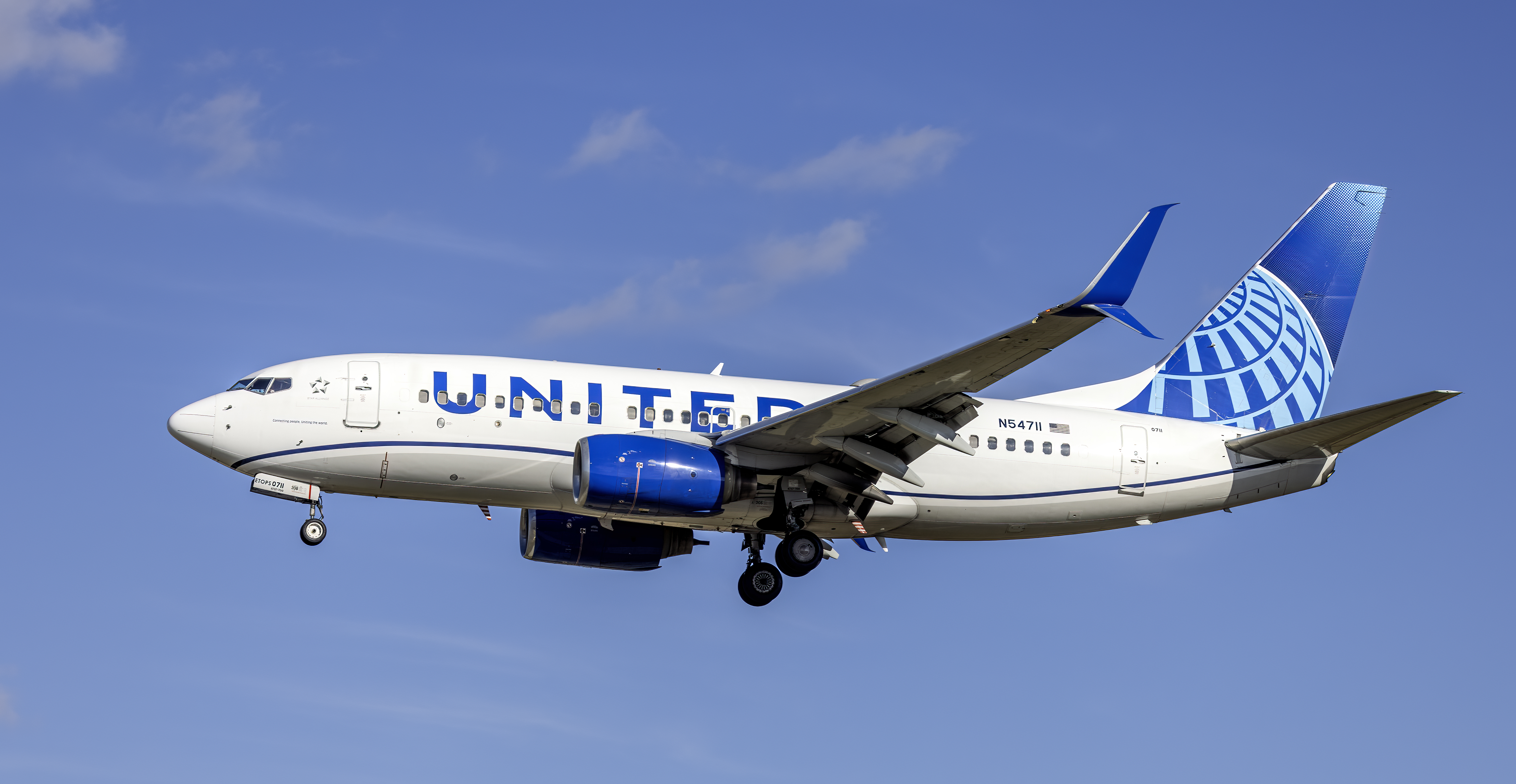
Boeing 737-700

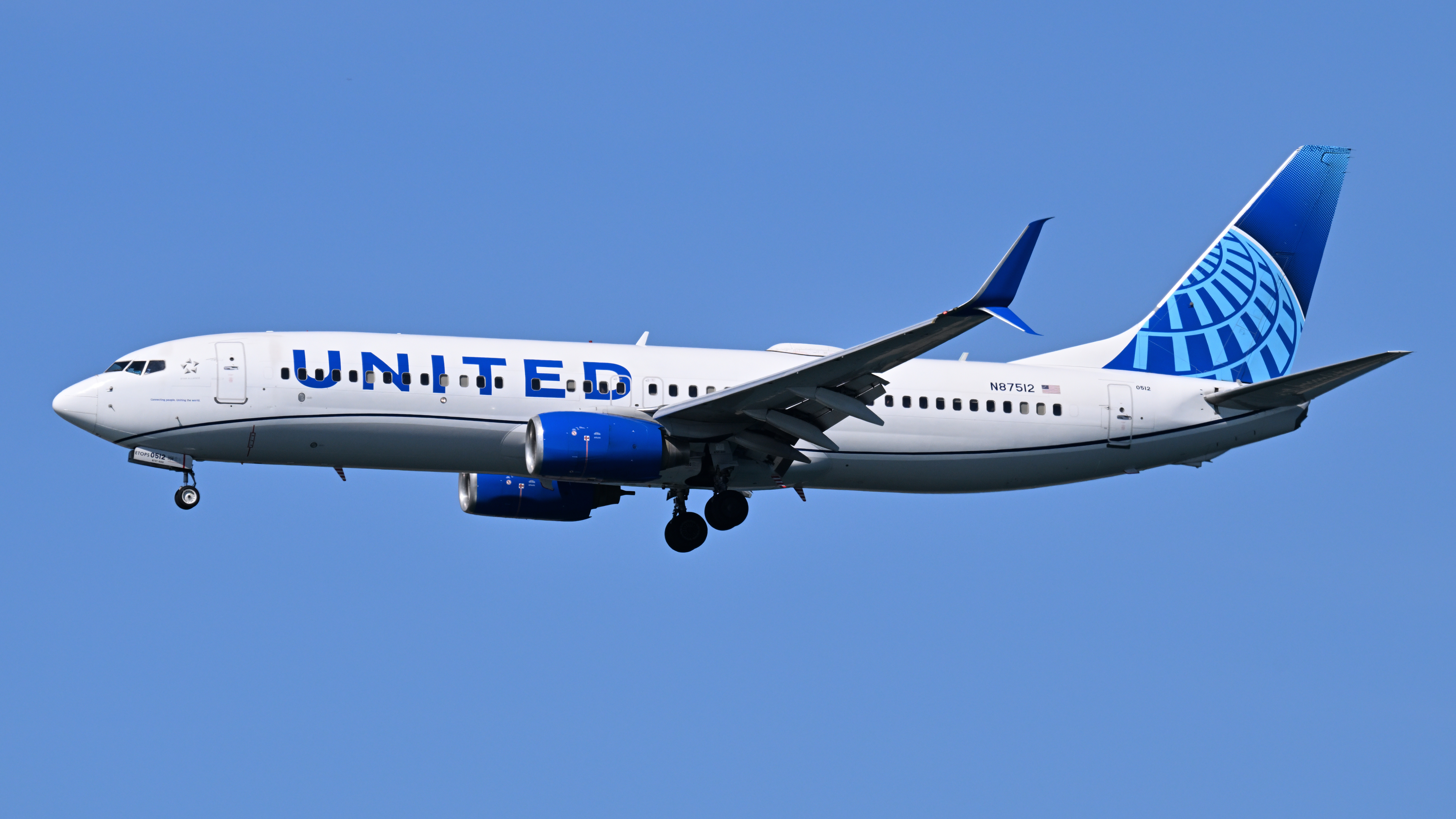
Boeing 737-800

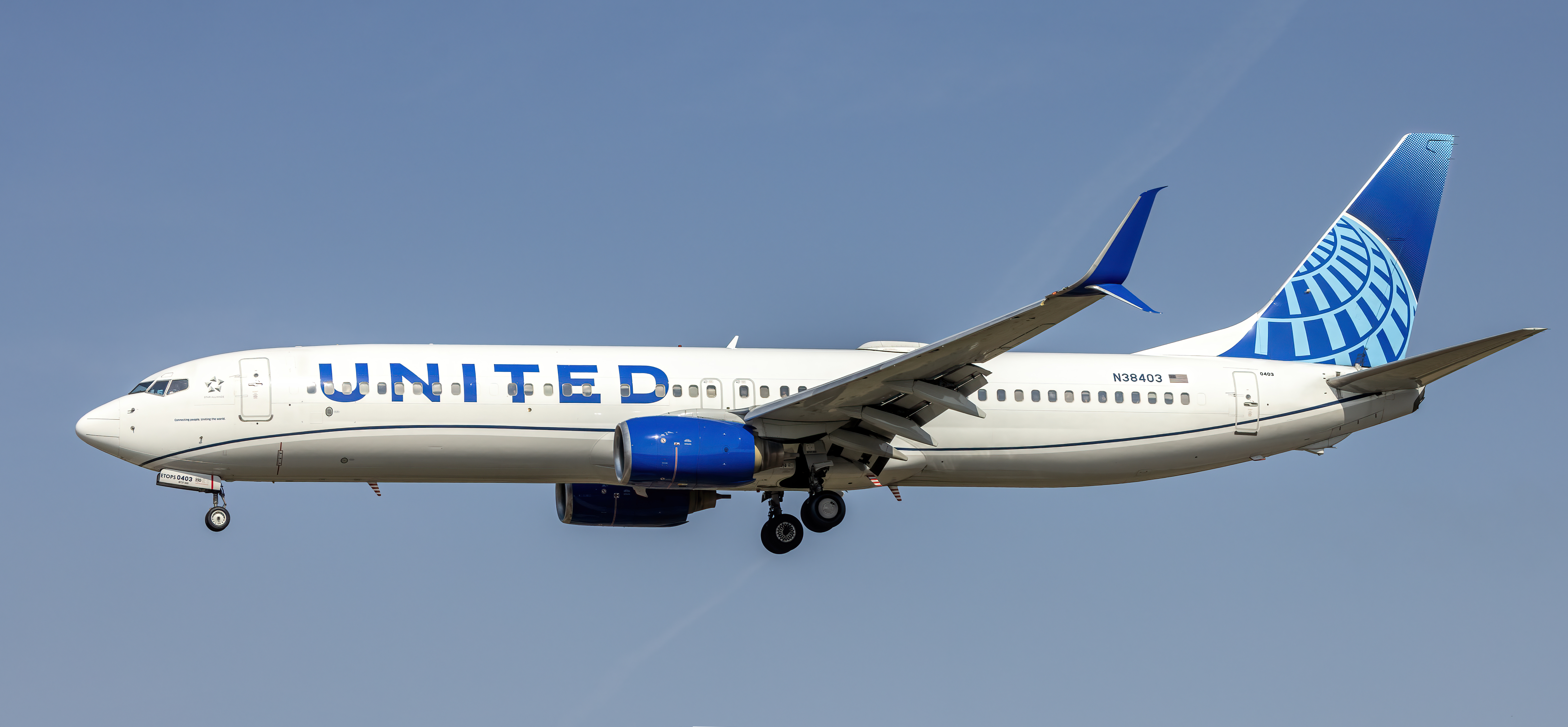
Boeing 737-900

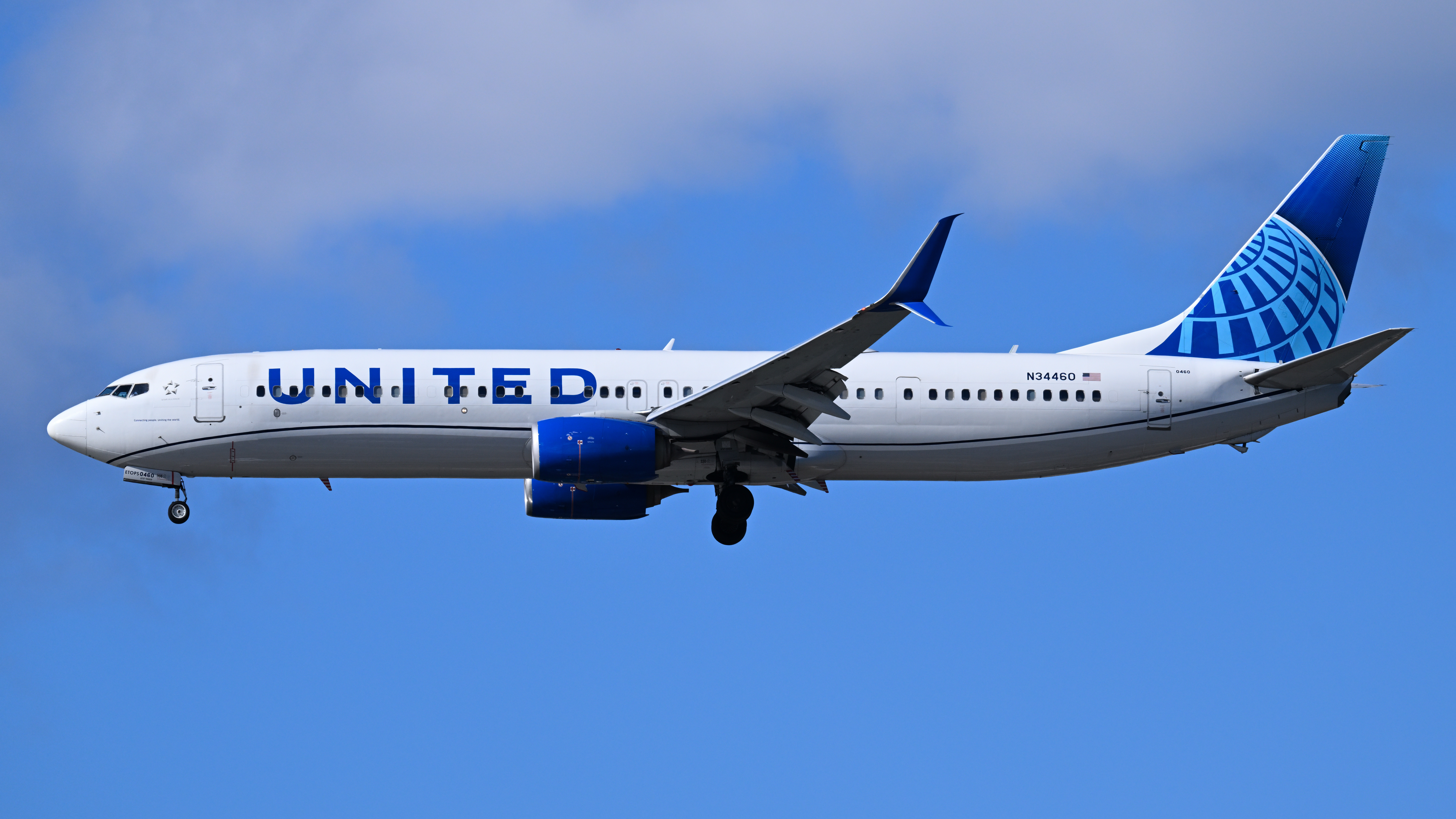
Boeing 737-900ER

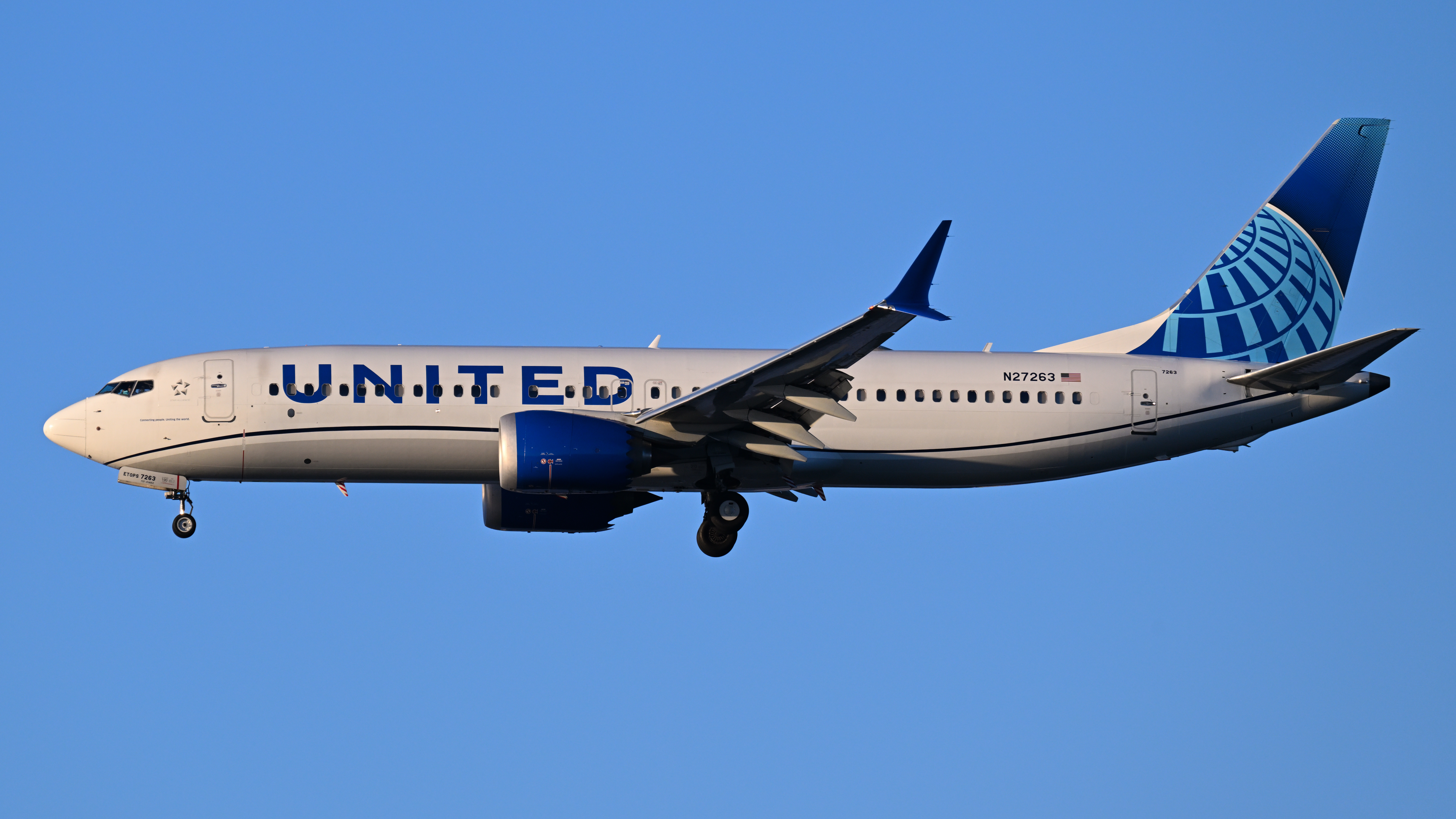
Boeing 737 MAX 8

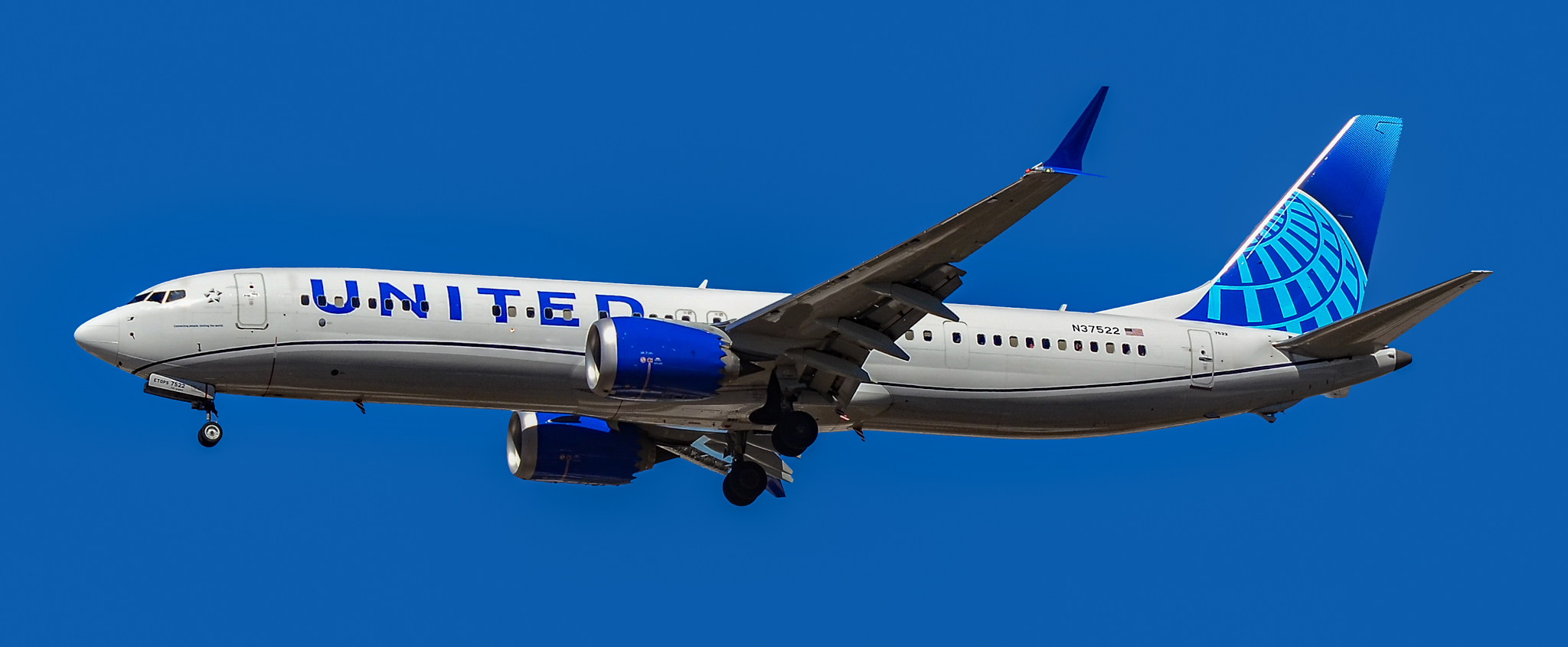
Boeing 737 MAX 9

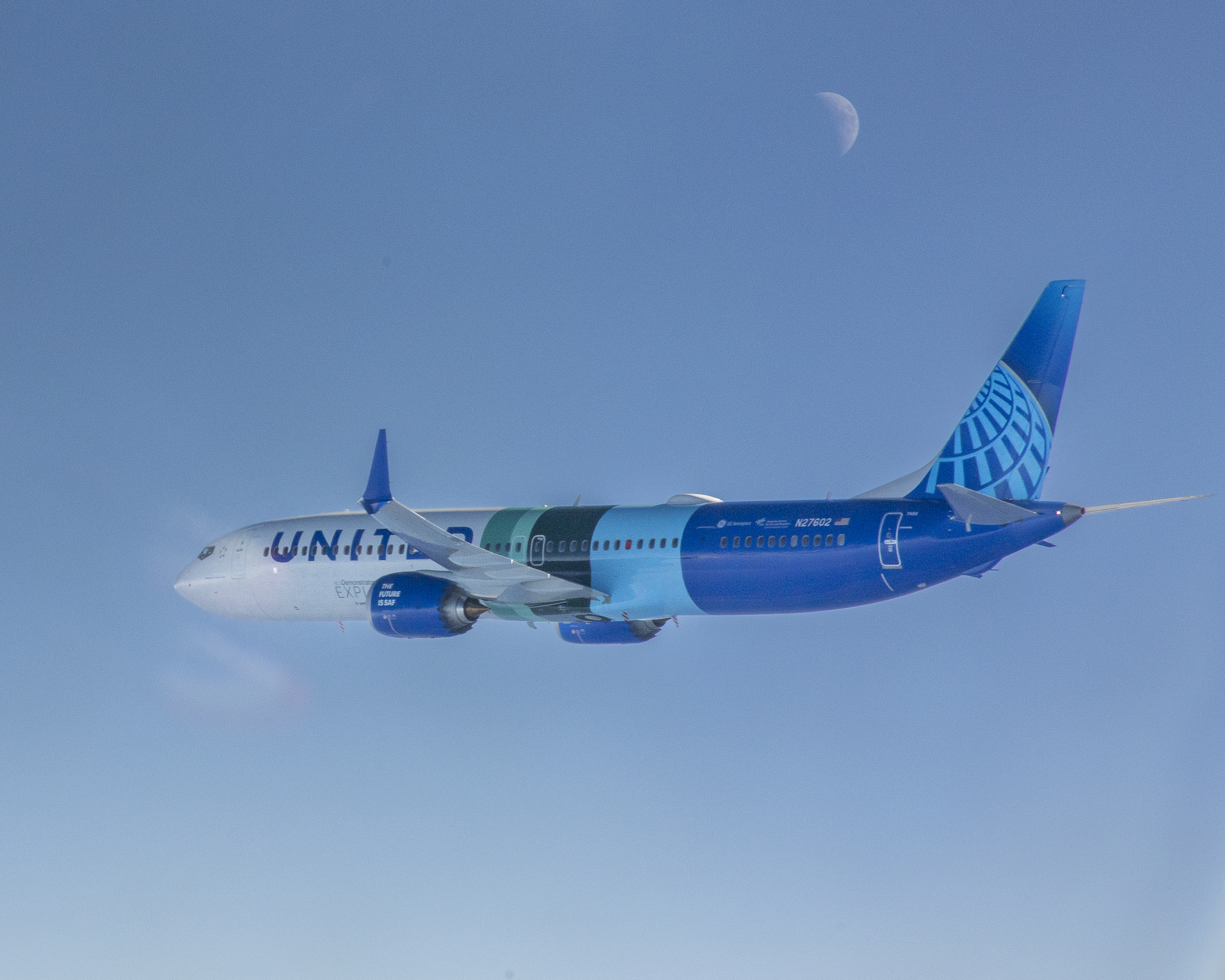
Boeing 737 MAX 10

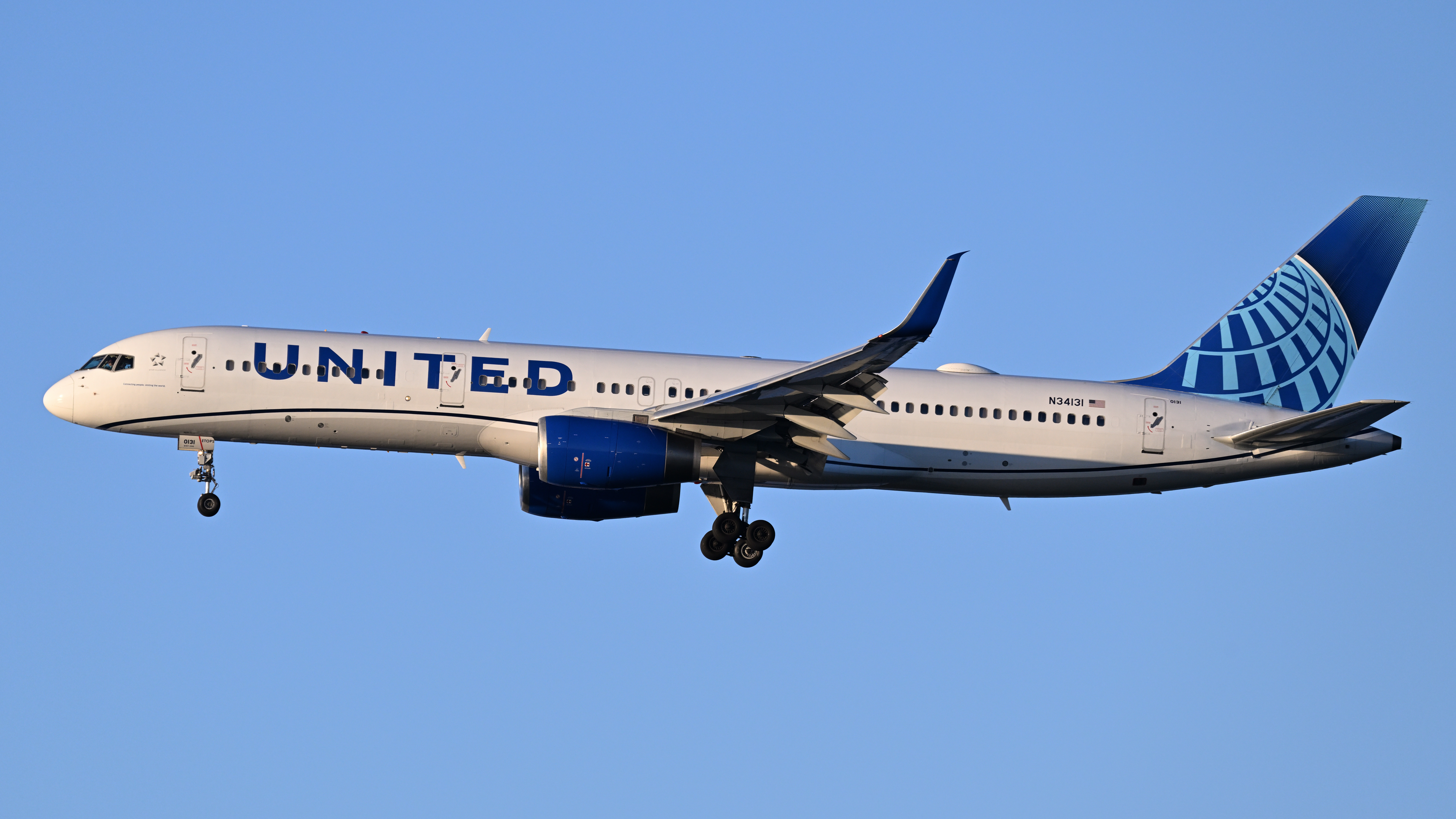
Boeing 757-200

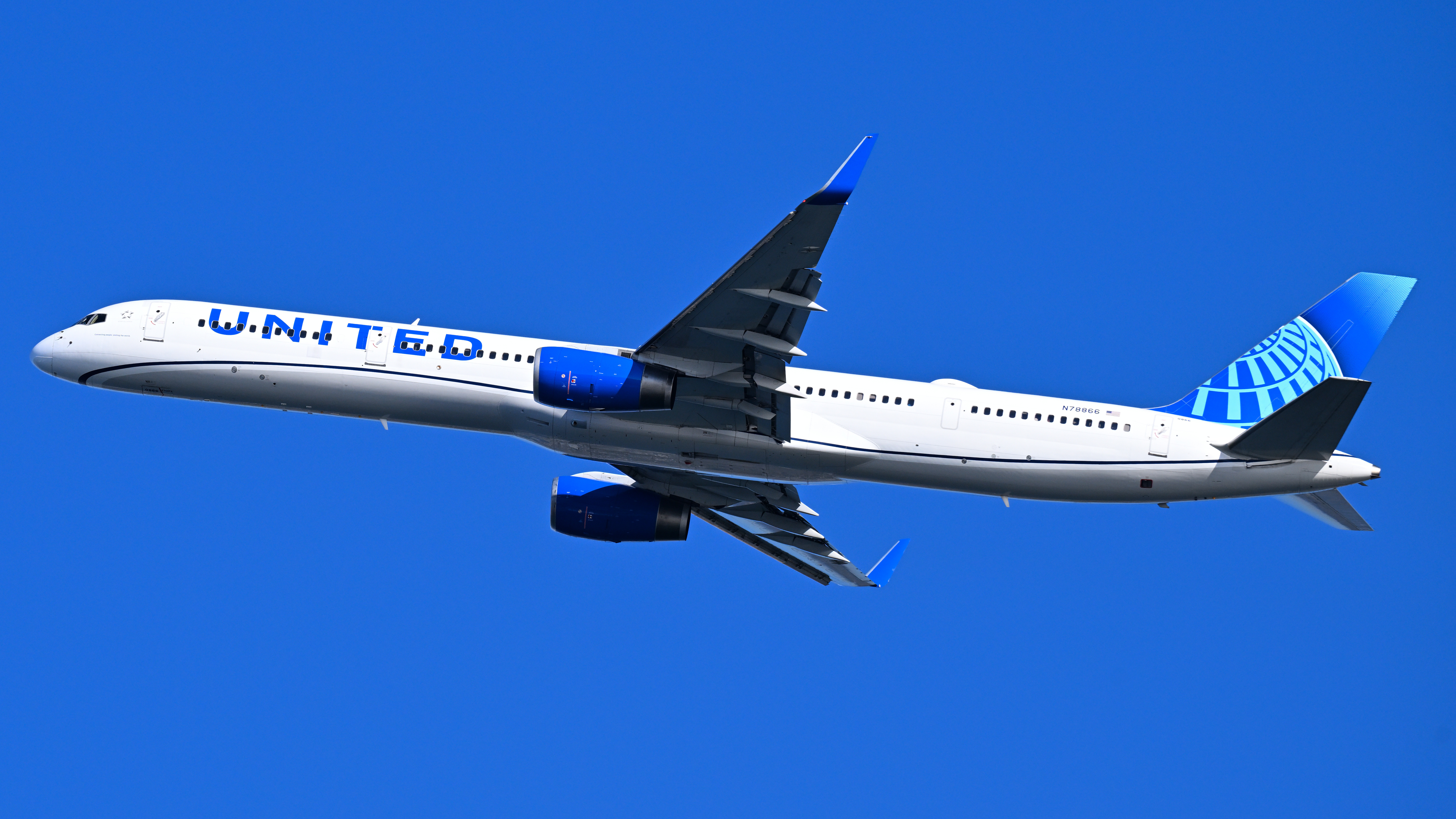
Boeing 757-300

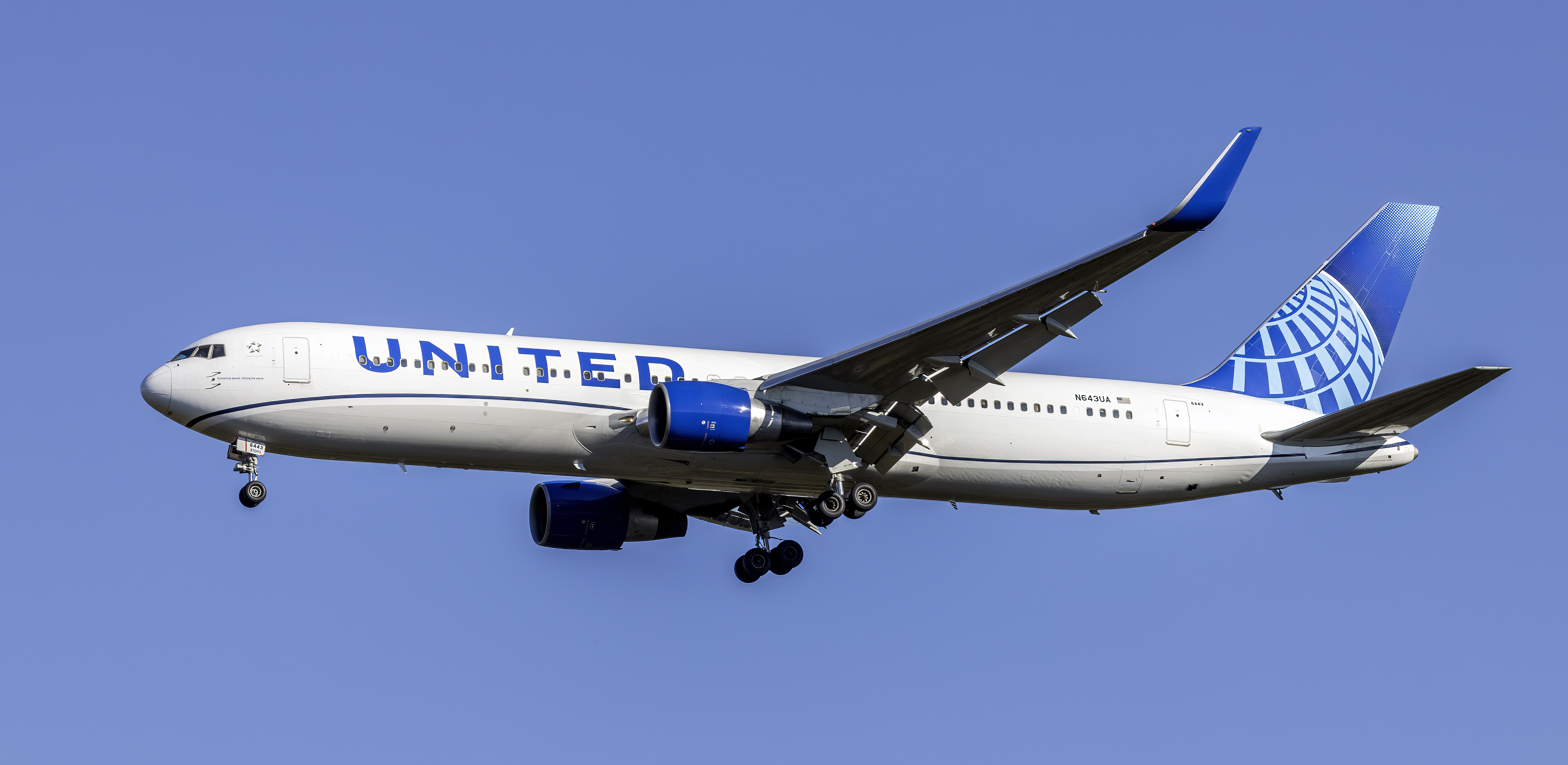
Boeing 767-300ER

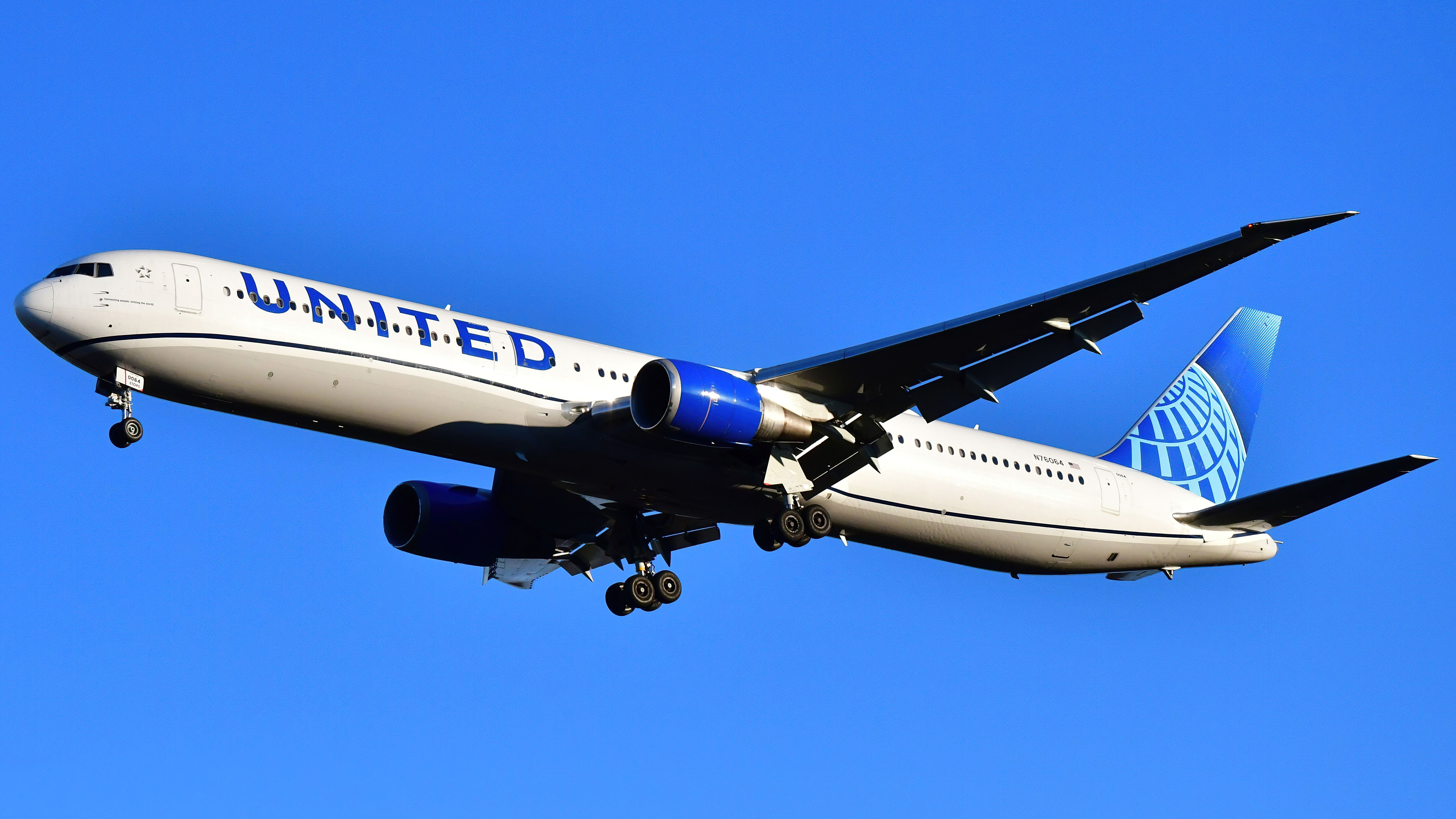
Boeing 767-400ER

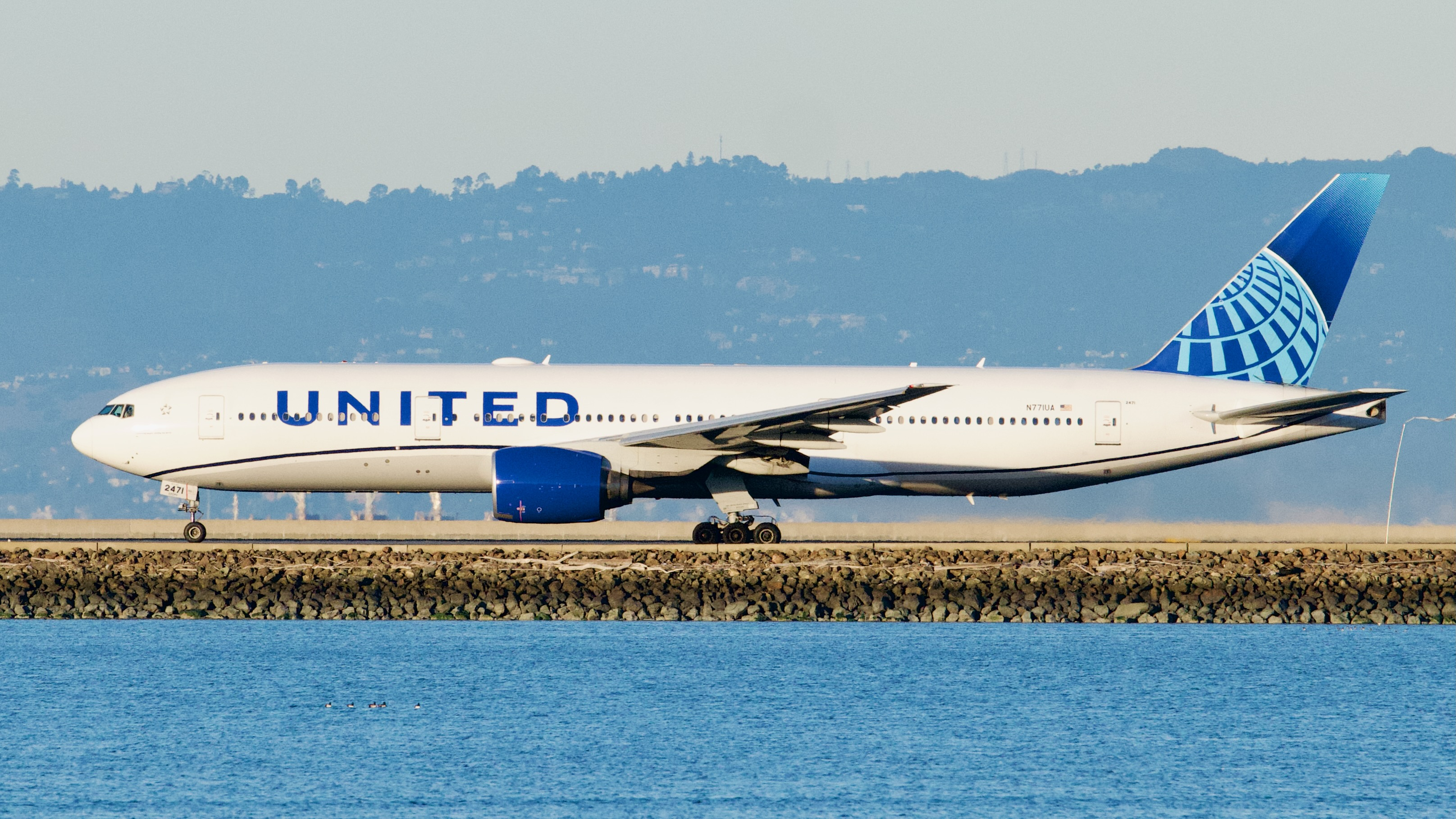
Boeing 777-200

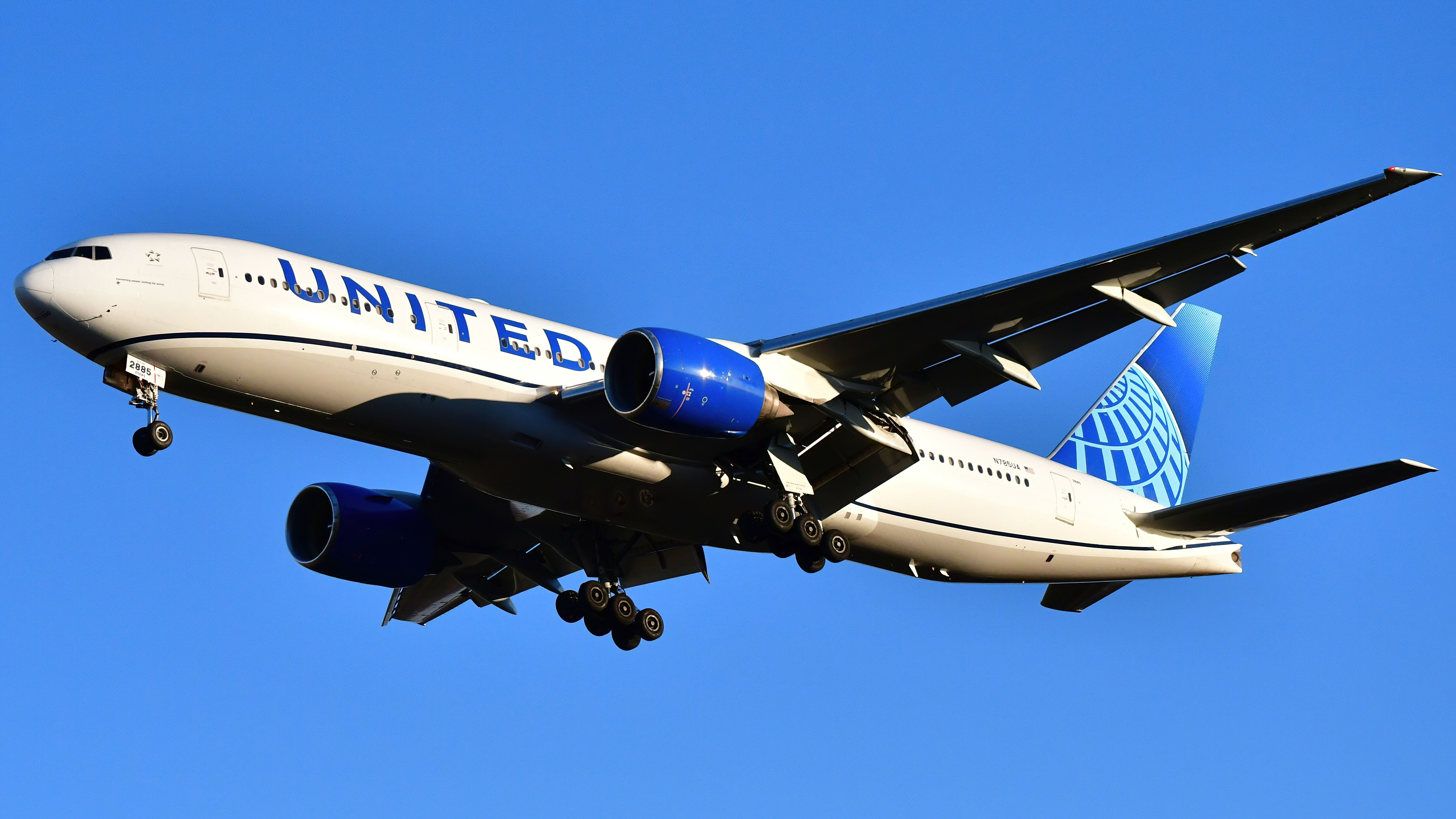
Boeing 777-200ER

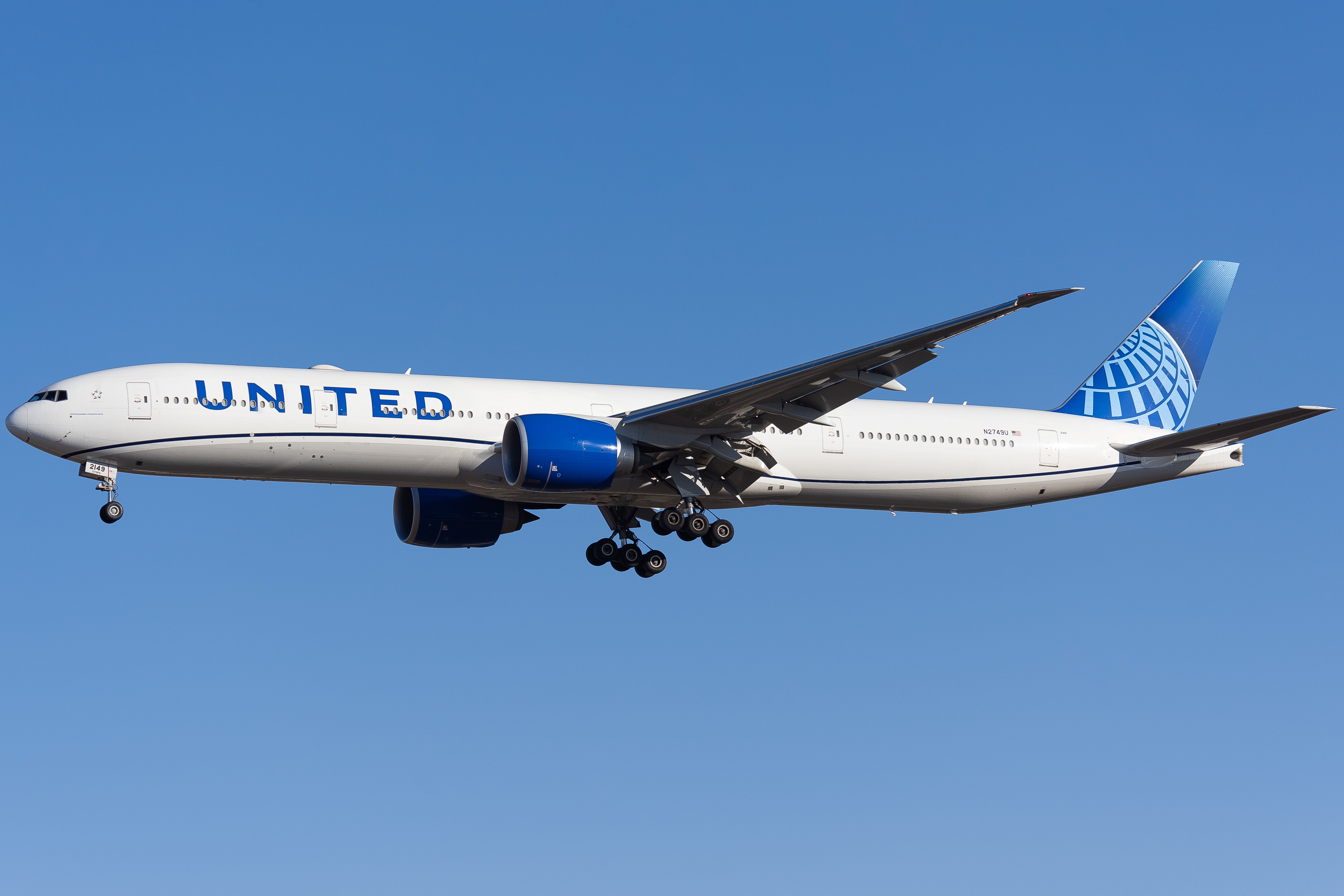
Boeing 777-300ER

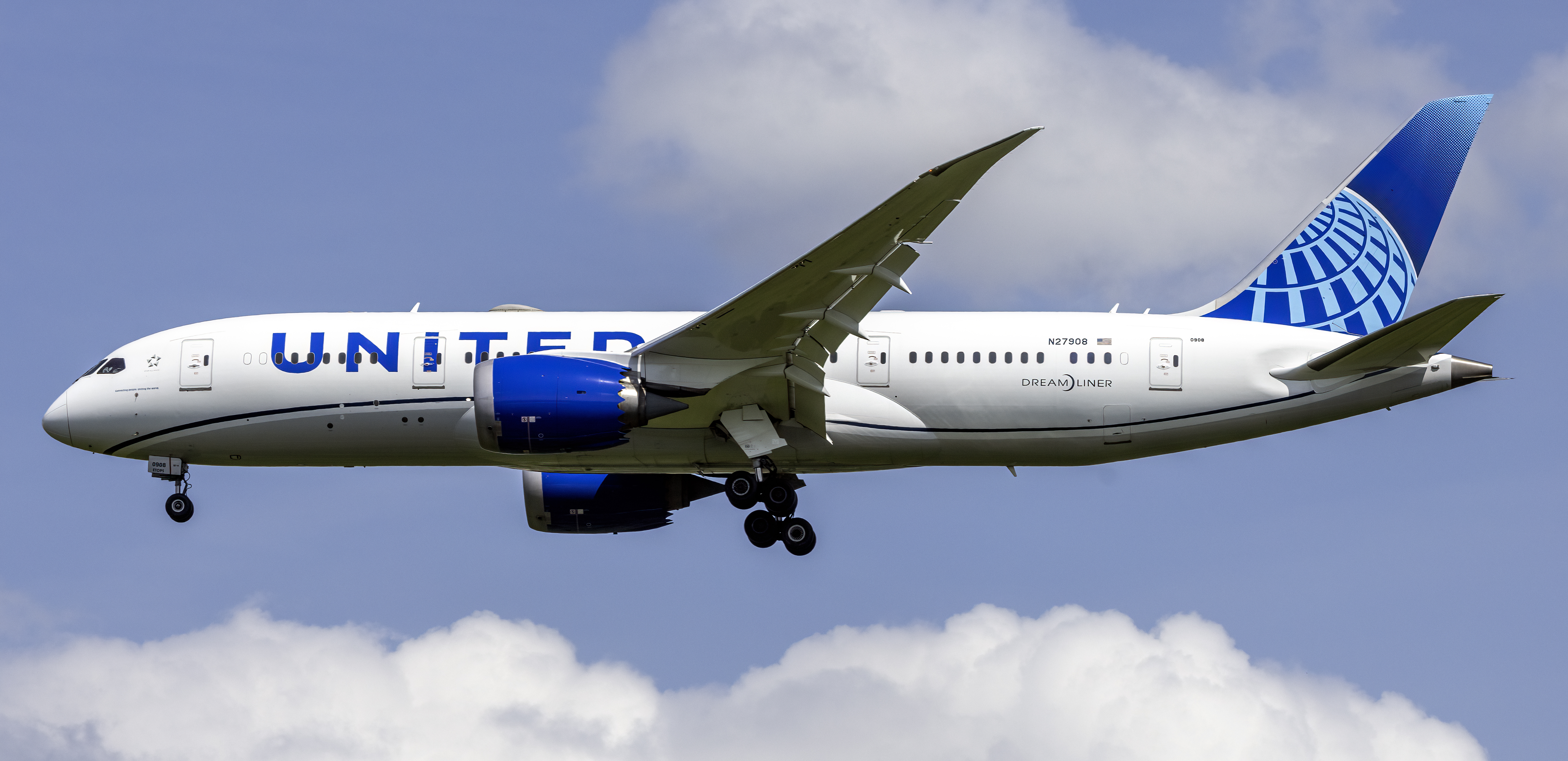
Boeing 787-8

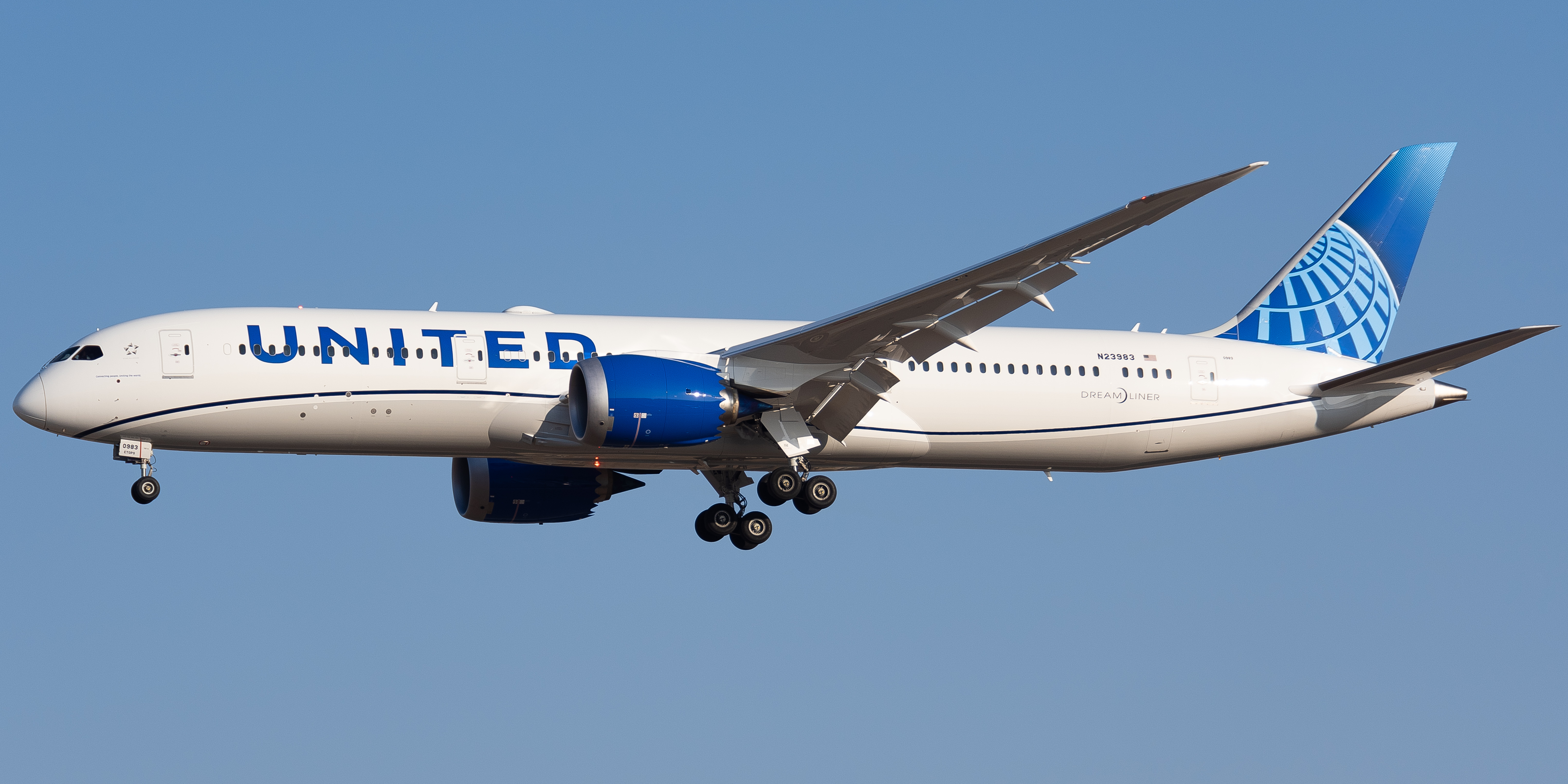
Boeing 787-9

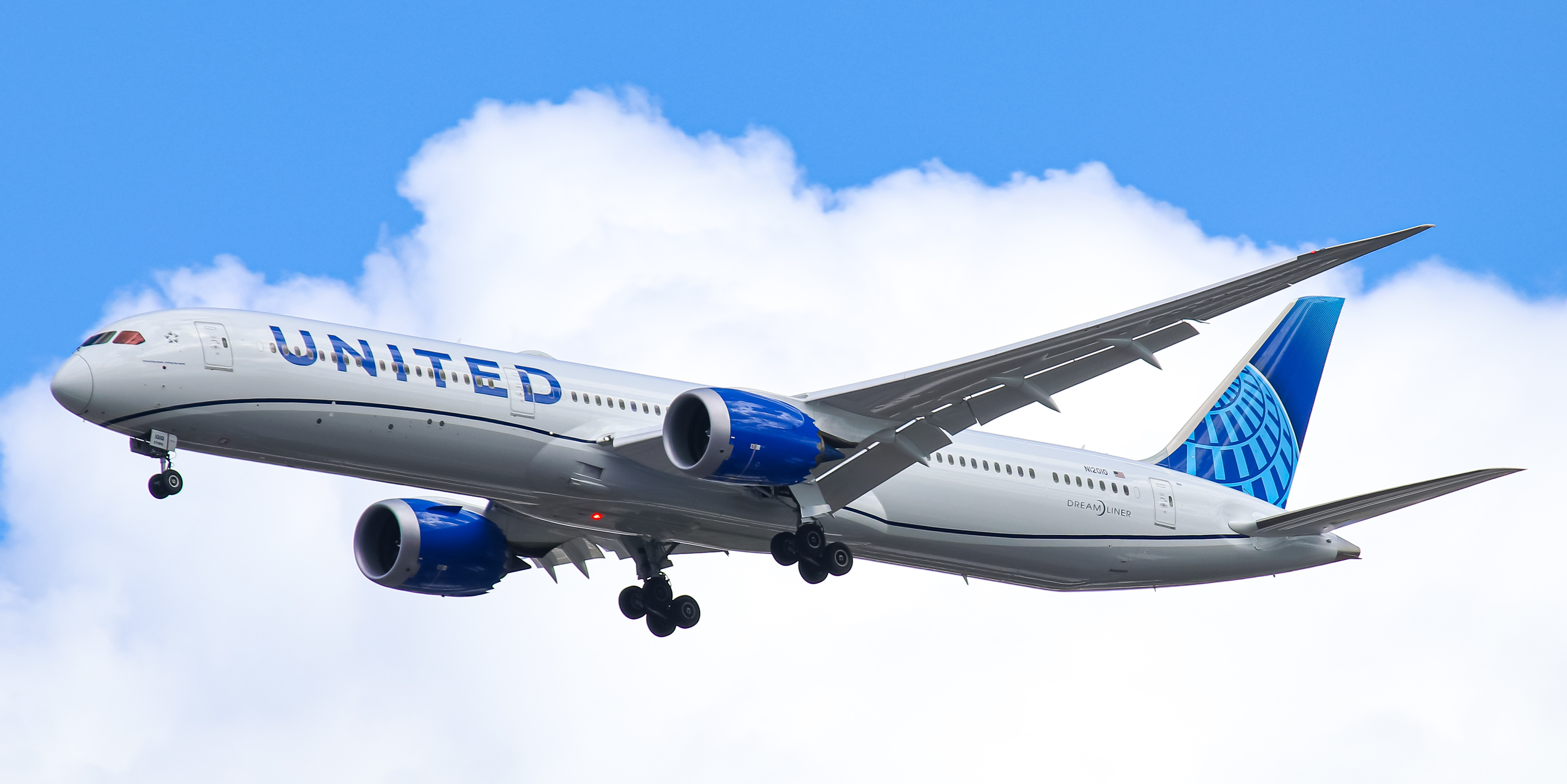
Boeing 787-10

== Historical fleet ==
As an indication of fleet growth over the years, in February 1965 Flight International reported the following numbers; 38 Douglas DC-8s, 3 DC-8Fs, 29 Boeing 720s, 26 Boeing 727s, 20 Caravelles, 45 Viscounts, 40 DC-6Bs, 30 DC-6s, 13 Convair 340s, and 7 DC-6As, for a total of 251 aircraft (across five different manufacturers).

United Airlines former fleet
Aircraft	Total	Introduced	Retired	Replacement	Notes
Boeing 40A	Unknown	1927	1937	Unknown	Launch customer. Operated by Boeing Air Transport and Varney Air Lines.
Boeing 80A	Unknown	1928	1934	Unknown	Launch customer. Operated by Boeing Air Transport.
Boeing 247	59	1933	1942	Unknown	Launch customer. All base models were built for United Airlines.
Boeing 377 Stratocruiser	7	1950	1954	Unknown	
Boeing 720	29	1960	1976	Boeing 727-200	Launch customer.
Boeing 727-100	126	1963	1993	Boeing 737-500	Three crashed as Flight 389, Flight 227, and Flight 266.
Boeing 727-200	104	1968	2001	Airbus A320 family Bombardier CRJ-700	
Boeing 737-200	101	1968	2001	Airbus A320 family Bombardier CRJ-700	Launch customer. Two crashed as Flight 553 and Flight 585.
Boeing 737-300	103	1986	2009	Airbus A320 family Bombardier CRJ-700	
Boeing 737-500	73	1990	2009	Airbus A320 family Bombardier CRJ-700	
Boeing 737-500	29	2010	2013	Boeing 737-900ER	Former Continental Airlines fleet.
Boeing 747-100	23	1970	1999	Boeing 747-400; Boeing 777-200/200ER	One was damaged as Flight 811, but was later repaired and re-registered as N4724U. Another was damaged as Flight 826.
Boeing 747-200B	10	1987	2000	Boeing 747-400; Boeing 777-200/200ER	
Boeing 747SP	11	1985	1995	Boeing 747-400; Boeing 767-300ER; Boeing 777-200	Former Pan Am fleet.
Boeing 747-400	44	1989	2017	Boeing 777-200ER; Boeing 777-300ER	Largest operator of Boeing 747-400 in United States.
Boeing 757-200	99	1989	2020	Boeing 737-900ER; Airbus A321neo	One hijacked and crashed into a field in Shanksville, Pennsylvania as United Airlines Flight 93, as part of the September 11 attacks. 40 remain in service as of 2026.
Boeing 767-200	19	1982	2005	Boeing 757-200; Boeing 767-300ER; Boeing 777-200	Launch customer. Many were later upgraded to -ER standards. One hijacked and crashed into the South Tower of the World Trade Center as Flight 175, as part of the September 11 attacks.
Boeing 767-200ER	10	2010	2013	Boeing 757-200; Boeing 767-300ER; Boeing 777-200	Former Continental Airlines fleet.
Boeing 767-300ER	3	1991	2022	Boeing 787 Dreamliner	One scrapped due to paint corrosion. 37 remain in service as of 2026.
Boeing 777-200	3	1995	2006	Boeing 787 Dreamliner	One sold to Air India Two sold to Varig
Boeing 777-200ER	5	1997	2005	Boeing 787 Dreamliner	Three sold to Air India Two sold to Varig
Convair 340	52	1952	1968	Unknown	
Douglas DC-3	118	1936	1956	Convair 340	
Douglas DC-4	36	1946	1957	Unknown	
Douglas DC-4E	1	1939	1939	None	Used in trial service only.
Douglas DC-6	90	1946	1969	Unknown	
Douglas DC-6B	90	1946	1969	Unknown	
Douglas DC-7	57	1954	1966	Unknown	Two crashed as Flight 718 and Flight 736.
Douglas DC-8-10	2	1959	1961	None	Two crashed as Flight 826 and Flight 859.
Douglas DC-8-20	30	1959	1982	Boeing 727-200	
McDonnell Douglas DC-8-30	11	1967	1974	Boeing 727-200	
McDonnell Douglas DC-8-50	18	1959	1983	Boeing 727-200	
McDonnell Douglas DC-8-50	15	1964	1987	None	Cargo fleet. Two crashed as Flight 2860 and Flight 2885.
McDonnell Douglas DC-8-60	41	1967	1991	Boeing 757-200	One crashed as Flight 173.
McDonnell Douglas DC-8-70	41	1967	1991	Boeing 757-200	
Ford Trimotor	Unknown	1931	Unknown	Unknown	Operated on a transcontinental route between New York City and San Francisco.
Laird Swallow J-5	Unknown	Unknown	Unknown	Unknown	Single seat biplane used to carry US Air Mail (CAM 5) by predecessor Varney Air Lines.
Lockheed L-1011 TriStar	6	1986	1989	Boeing 747-100; McDonnell Douglas DC-10-30	Former Pan Am fleet. All aircraft were sold to Delta Air Lines.
McDonnell Douglas DC-10-10	48	1971	2001	Boeing 757-200; Boeing 767-300ER; Boeing 777-200	Launch customer. One crashed as Flight 232.
McDonnell Douglas DC-10-30	7	1983	2001	Boeing 757-200; Boeing 767-300ER; Boeing 777-200	
McDonnell Douglas DC-10-30	4	1997	2001	None	Converted into freighters for the short-lived "United Airlines Worldwide Cargo" service.
Sud Aviation Caravelle	20	1961	1970	Boeing 727; Boeing 737-200	Only U.S. operator in scheduled passenger service. Used to operate "Executive" service between Chicago and Newark restricted to men only passengers. Also operated on other United domestic services.
Vickers Viscount	48	1961	1969	Boeing 727; Boeing 737-200	Former Capital Airlines aircraft. Only mainline turboprop aircraft type ever operated by United Airlines.

== Sources ==
- Taylor, H. A. "Boeing's Trend-Setting 247". Air Enthusiast, No. 9, February–May 1979, pp. 43–54. ISSN 0143-5450.
