= 1958 BOAC Bristol Britannia crash =

1958 aviation accident

Winkton Air Crash
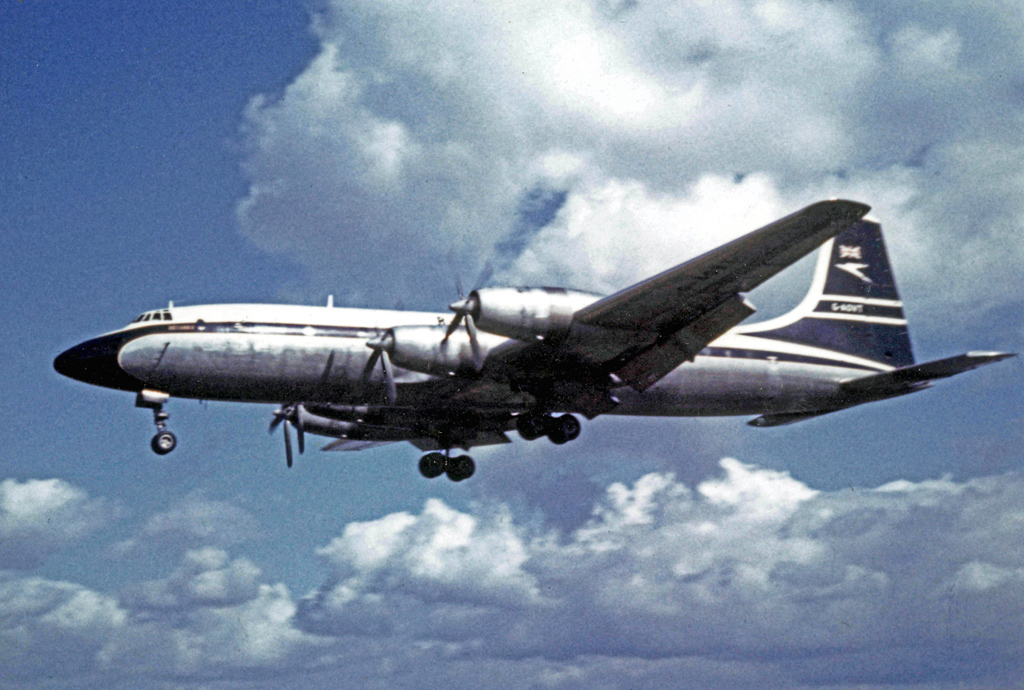
- A Bristol Britannia 312, similar to the accident aircraft

Accident
- Date: 24 December 1958
- Summary: Pilot error and CFIT
- Site: Sopley Park & Winkton; 50.767°N 1.768°W

Aircraft
- Aircraft type: Bristol Britannia 312
- Operator: BOAC
- Registration: G-AOVD
- Flight origin: London England
- Destination: Hurn Airfield (Now Bournemouth International Airport)
- Passengers: 7
- Crew: 5
- Fatalities: 9
- Injuries: 3
- Survivors: 3

G-AOVD was a Bristol Britannia 312 operated by BOAC which crashed near Christchurch, Dorset, in the south of England on Christmas Eve 1958, killing two of the five crew and all seven passengers.

== Weather conditions ==
On 24 December 1958 much of the south of England was covered in thick fog making travel by any means hazardous. Many aircraft had to be diverted as visibility was below the minimum permissible distance at most of the airports on the south coast. To a pilot who was less than aware of the conditions on the ground and the altitude at which they were flying, this fog would have an appearance very similar to normal cloud cover. For the pilots of G-AOVD this may have added to the illusion that they were at a much higher altitude and that they were reading the instruments correctly.

== Accident sequence ==
The aircraft departed from London Heathrow Airport at 10:10 am on a test flight to renew its certificate of airworthiness with 12 persons aboard including five crew. After completing the test, at approximately 11:55 am, the crew requested clearance to descend from 12,000 feet to 3,000 feet for approach to Hurn Airport, possibly as an alternate destination due to poor weather at Heathrow. Approximately 3 minutes later, at 11:58 am, Hurn Airport lost contact with the aircraft as it struck the ground, crossing a road into a ploughed field, bringing down telephone lines and trees and alerting residents in the nearby villages. Upon realising they had lost contact with the aircraft, the controller at Hurn contacted the emergency services giving the last known position before contact was lost. Likewise the residents of Winkton, Sopley, and people living near Bransgore contacted emergency services saying they believed that they had heard the sound of a low flying aircraft and the sound of a crash.

== Emergency response and rescue of survivors ==
Around midday, the members of the volunteer fire service in Burley and Christchurch were alerted by an air raid siren calling them to the station to respond to the report of the crash. The initial report from Hurn Airport stated that they were unaware of the type of aircraft involved or how many passengers were being carried, and that they believed the aircraft was to the north of the airport when it crashed. However, on receiving updated information on the reports from Winkton and Sopley the fire crews decided to start the search for the aircraft in that area.

The fire service searching in Winkton discovered the location of the wreckage after travelling a short distance along the Burley Road and finding telephone poles and cables which had been broken and dragged into a field off the road. A foot search was mounted and eventually the crew spotted some broken trees along with aircraft debris and a fire. The crew chief sent a message to fire control to confirm the location of the crash and set up a rendezvous at a local public house to give emergency services a positive location. Another appliance which had been sent to Sopley to search there could not be contacted as it was not fitted with a radio; fortunately, however, its crew encountered other appliances heading towards the incident, and were then informed of the location.

Another hindrance to the emergency effort was the lack of a four-wheel drive appliance which meant that the firemen had to attempt to drive an eight-ton vehicle over a ploughed field, which delayed the rescue. While this was going on, the crew chief and some of the crew from the first appliance on the scene continued to search on foot and eventually found the remains of the cockpit with the injured co-pilot trapped inside. They began to cut him free and as further emergency services arrived on the scene, a coordinated search and rescue effort was mounted over the site, fanning out and finding a further two survivors. The fire station was eventually able to confirm what aircraft had been involved and the number of people on board at the time. Having received this information the emergency services were able to account for all the people involved and to continue putting out the fires.

== Investigation ==
The crash was attributed to a failure on the part of the captain and first officer to correctly establish the altitude of the aircraft before and during the descent. The Britannia aircraft was fitted with a three-handed altimeter which required a higher degree of concentration to read correctly than was desirable. The crew misread the instrument believing that they were at 11,500 feet when they began descending, when in fact they were at only 1,500 feet. As a result, they flew the aircraft into the ground which was obscured by fog at the time. The type of flight in which the aircraft was engaged was also thought to be a contributing factor.

It was concluded that this crash was a controlled flight into terrain (CFIT) and that there were no defects with the aircraft or its systems which contributed to the crash. For this the failure to read the instruments correctly rests with the captain. This was not the first crash involving a crew misreading this type of altimeter in this long distance, high altitude aircraft. As a direct result of this and other similar incidents, altimeters would now be required to display a cross-hatch or chequered flag when indicating an altitude below 1500 feet. Furthermore, all fire appliances in Christchurch would now be fitted with radios for improved communication, and when four-wheel drive appliances became available, Christchurch was one of the first rural stations to be allocated one.

== Aftermath ==
As a result of the accident the Ministry of Transport issued a directive to replace all three-pointer altimeters in British registered aircraft which operated at over 20,000 feet before September 1959. This followed an investigation of the problems of interpretation of the display. An interim flight safety warning was also issued pending altimeter replacement which described the risk of misreading these altimeters as "most likely when the routine monitoring of the instrument panel has been interrupted. If this happened during climb or descent the height when the instruments are rescanned may be very different from the anticipated."

== See also ==
- Some other crashes where three-handed altimeter misreadings are suspected:
  - Iberia Flight 062
  - United Air Lines Flight 389
