= Iberia Flight 062 =

Aviation accident in 1967

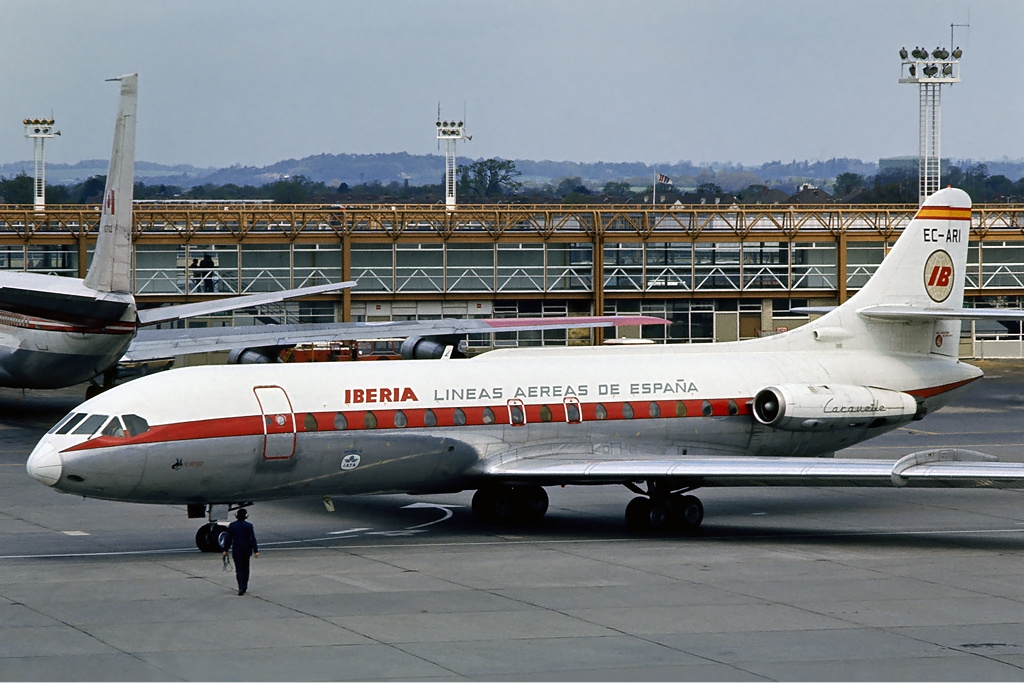
- An Iberia Sud Aviation Caravelle similar to the accident aircraft

Accident
- Date: 4 November 1967
- Summary: Controlled flight into terrain for undetermined reasons
- Site: Near Blackdown Hill, United Kingdom; 51°03′06″N 0°41′26″W

Aircraft
- Aircraft type: Sud Aviation Caravelle 10R
- Aircraft name: Jesús Guridi
- Operator: Iberia
- Call sign: IBERIA 062
- Registration: EC-BDD
- Flight origin: Málaga Airport, Spain
- Destination: London Heathrow Airport, UK
- Occupants: 37
- Passengers: 30
- Crew: 7
- Fatalities: 37
- Survivors: 0

Iberia Flight 062 was a twin-engined Sud Aviation Caravelle registered EC-BDD operating a scheduled flight from Málaga Airport, Spain, to London Heathrow Airport. While on approach to Heathrow on 4 November 1967, the Caravelle descended far below the flight level assigned to it and flew into the southern slope of Blackdown Hill in West Sussex, killing all 37 on board.

== Crash sequence ==
The time of the accident was approximately 10:02 pm, about 5½ minutes after the plane had been cleared to descend from FL110 (11000 ft) to FL60 (6000 ft). Flying at a shallow rate of descent, the Caravelle first clipped trees near Black Down House, then broke through a large hedge and careened across a meadow where 65 sheep were killed outright and 23 more were fatally injured. The disintegrating plane continued on, destroying a garage and damaging parts of the roof of Upper Black Down House.

Aviation fuel caused small fires to break out in the wooded hillside. Debris from the aircraft was scattered over the whole of the roughly 355 yards (325 m; 1,065 ft) of its passage.

== Investigation ==
An investigation could not determine why the aircraft descended through its assigned flight level. Audio recordings taken from air traffic control and from the recovered cockpit voice recorder revealed nothing unusual. The investigation stated that "no evidence was found of any pre-crash failure or defect in either the airframe or the engines, or of any faulty workmanship."

The investigation report gave considerable attention to the possibility that the air crew could have misread their "three-pointer" altimeters, which were designed to warn the pilots with a cross hatch indicator when the altitude was below 10,000 feet. An excerpt from the report stated:

"The aircraft descended continuously at a steady rate over a period of 13½ minutes and the pointers would have been in continuous motion throughout, increasing the likelihood of misreading. The cross hatching in this type of altimeter first appears in a window in the 10,000ft disc at an indicated altitude of 26,666ft and the edge of the cross hatching would have been visible within 2 minutes of the aircraft beginning its descent. At 10,000ft the cross hatching completely fills the window and it remains filled as long as the aircraft is below 10,000ft. Thus the cross hatching would have been visible to the crew for a period of about 9½ minutes before the aircraft passed through FL60 and it is a matter of conjecture whether it was still an effective warning to them at that stage of the descent.

"With this type of altimeter it is not difficult to read an indication of 6,000ft as 16,000ft if particular note is not made of the position of the 10,000ft pointer. Evidence against the possibility of simple misreading of this sort is the message from the aircraft to ATC reporting passing FL145, indicating at this time the crew knew that they were below 16,000ft. "

== Victims ==
Among the dead was British film and TV actress June Thorburn, who was five months pregnant.

A mass grave and memorial for 19 of the deceased is located 28 km (17 mi) north of the crash site at 51°18′09″N 0°37′44″W in Brookwood Cemetery, Brookwood, Surrey.

The nationality of the 37 casualties are listed below.

Nationality	Casualties
United Kingdom	25
Spain	9 (inc. 7 crew)
United States	2
Australia	1

== See also ==
- United Air Lines Flight 389 – another incident where altimeter misreading is suspected, but not proven
