= United Air Lines Flight 227 =

1965 aviation accident

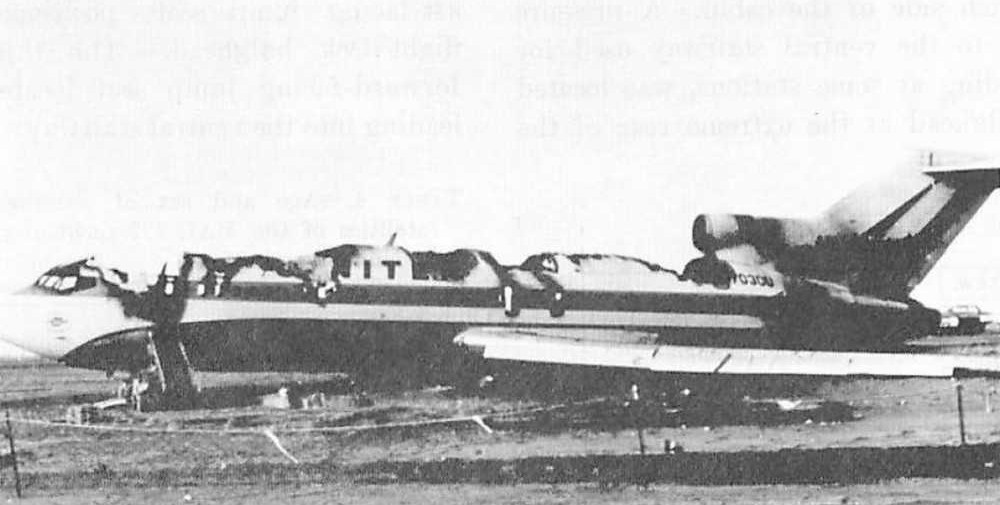
- Flight 227 after the fire

Accident
- Date: November 11, 1965
- Summary: Crashed short of runway due to pilot error
- Site: Salt Lake City International Airport, Salt Lake City, Utah, United States; 40°46′21″N 111°59′43″W

Aircraft
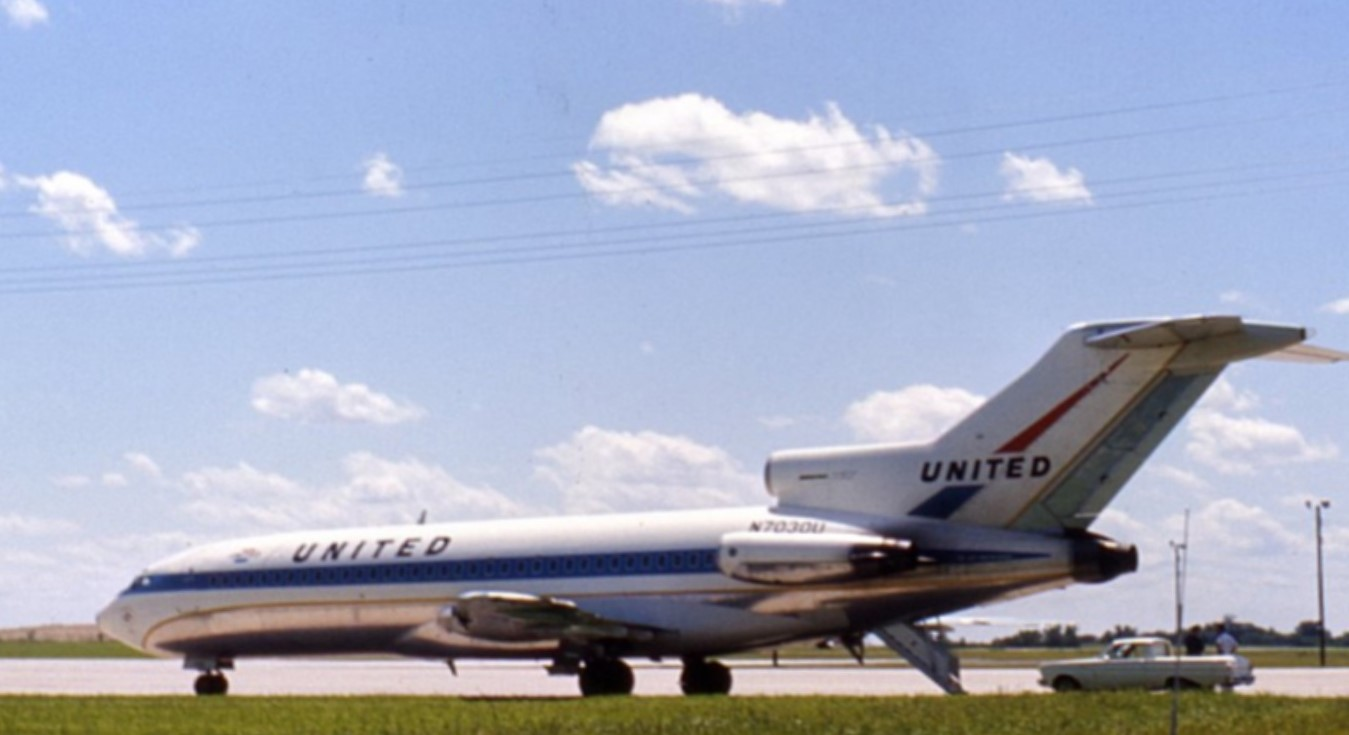
- N7030U, the aircraft involved, seen in July 1965
- Aircraft type: Boeing 727-22
- Operator: United Air Lines
- Call sign: UNITED 227
- Registration: N7030U
- Flight origin: LaGuardia Airport (New York)
- 1st stopover: Cleveland Hopkins International Airport
- 2nd stopover: Chicago Midway Airport
- 3rd stopover: Stapleton International Airport
- Last stopover: Salt Lake City International Airport
- Destination: San Francisco International Airport
- Occupants: 91
- Passengers: 85
- Crew: 6
- Fatalities: 43
- Injuries: 35
- Survivors: 48

United Air Lines Flight 227 (N7030U), a scheduled passenger flight from LaGuardia Airport New York City to San Francisco International Airport, California, crashed short of the runway while attempting a scheduled landing at Salt Lake City International Airport, Utah, on Thursday, November 11, 1965.

== Aircraft ==
The aircraft involved was a Boeing 727-22, registered as N7030U with serial number 18322. It was manufactured by Boeing Commercial Airplanes in 1965, and was equipped with three Pratt & Whitney JT8D-1 engines. It had logged 1,781 airframe hours.

== Accident details ==
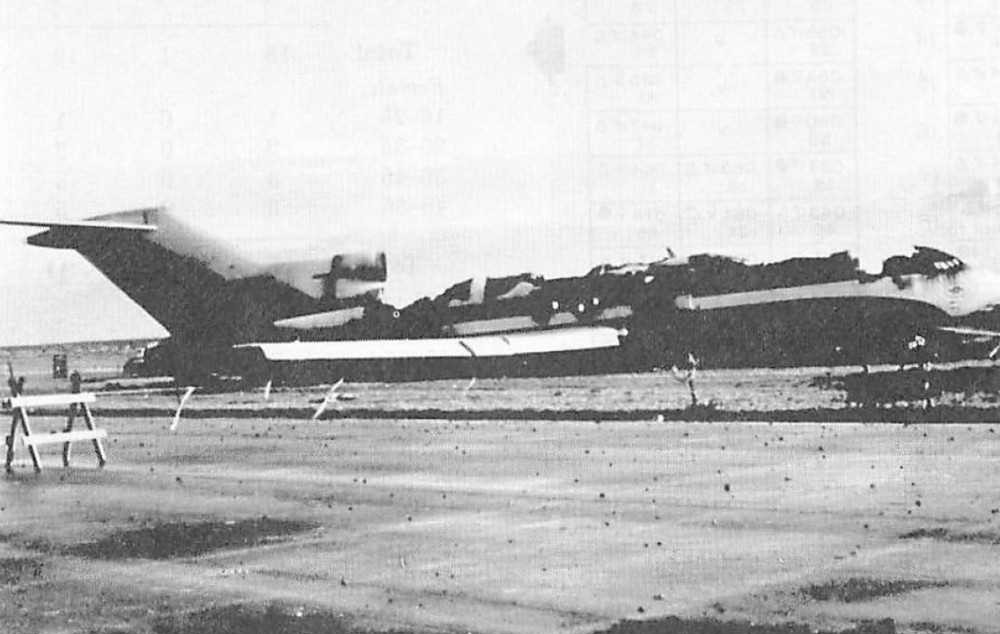
Another angle of N7030U's wreckage

Flight 227, operated by a Boeing 727-22, departed LaGuardia Airport at 08:35 MST (10:35 EST) for San Francisco, California, with scheduled stops in Cleveland, Chicago, Denver, and Salt Lake City. The flight to Denver was routine. In Denver, a new flight crew took control of the plane: Captain Gale C. Kehmeier, First Officer Philip E. Spicer, and Second Officer Ronald R. Christensen. The flight took off from Denver at 16:54 MST, a few minutes after sunset.

During the flight, the first officer was flying the aircraft under the direction of the captain. At 17:35, it was cleared to descend to 16,000 feet (4,900 m) by the Salt Lake City Air Route Traffic Control Center.

At 17:47, now under the direction of terminal control, the plane was cleared to approach. At 17:48, in response to the controller's request for the plane's altitude, the pilot replied, "Okay, we've slowed to two fifty (250 knots (460 km/h; 290 mph)) and we're at ten (10,000 feet (3,000 m)), we have the runway (34L) in sight now, we'll cancel and standby with you for traffic." The plane began to descend, but its rate of descent was approximately 2,300 feet (700 m) per minute, nearly three times the recommended rate of descent.

At approximately 17:49:30, the plane passed the outer marker 5.7 miles (9.2 km) from the runway threshold at approximately 8,200 feet (2,500 m), over 2,000 feet (610 m) above the normal glideslope. The elevation of the Salt Lake City airport is 4,227 feet (1,288 m) above sea level.

At approximately 17:51, one minute prior to impact, the plane passed 6,300 feet (1,900 m); it was still 1,300 feet (400 m) above the normal glideslope, and still descending at 2,300 feet (700 m) per minute. Around this time, the first officer reached forward to advance the thrust levers to increase thrust, but the captain brushed his hand aside and said, "Not yet." At thirty seconds prior to impact, the plane was 1,000 feet (300 m) above and 1.25 miles (2.0 km) from the runway. The captain indicated in post-crash interviews that at this point, he moved the thrust levers to the takeoff power position, but the engines failed to respond properly. However, both the testimonies of the other members of the flight crew and the data from the flight data recorder (FDR) indicate that the attempt to add power occurred only about ten seconds before impact.

At 17:52, the plane struck the ground 335 feet (102 m) short of the runway, then slid 2,838 feet (865 m). The separation of the landing gear and the No. 1 engine was the result of impact loading in excess of their design structural strength. The failure of the landing gear caused the rupture of fuel lines in the fuselage. The resulting fire, rather than the impact of the crash, accounted for all 43 fatalities. The incident occurred approximately forty minutes after sunset.

The Boeing aircraft had been delivered to United seven months earlier on April 7, 1965, and had less than 1,800 hours of flight time.

== Investigation conclusions ==
This accident was blamed entirely on the bad judgment of the captain, Gale C. Kehmeier, for conducting the final approach from a position that was too high and too close to the airport to permit a descent at the normal and safe rate. He allowed the plane to fly the final approach segment (in visual conditions) at a descent rate of 2,300 feet (700 m) per minute (triple the safe descent rate). When the plane crossed the outer marker, which marks the final approach segment, it was 2,000 feet (610 m) too high.

The first officer, who was flying the aircraft under the captain's direction, attempted to add engine thrust. But the captain told him no and brushed his hands off the thrust levers. The captain took over the controls during the last few seconds, but it was too late to avoid crashing short of runway 34L. The plane impacted with a vertical acceleration force of 4.7-g.

That severe impact force broke off the left main landing gear, and caused the right main gear to thrust up through the fuselage, rupturing pressurized fuel lines in the process. While the plane continued to slide down the runway on the nose gear and fuselage, pressurized fuel ignited inside the cabin, turning an initially survivable crash into a fatal accident. Many of the 50 people who successfully evacuated were severely burned.

The CAB (Civil Aeronautics Board) accident investigation revealed that the captain had a checkered training history. He had failed his initial jet transition training course, and was returned to flying the DC-6. Later on, he also failed to pass a routine annual instrument proficiency check.

== See also ==
- 1960 New York mid-air collision
- United Air Lines Flight 389
- United Air Lines Flight 826
