= 1968 Indian Air Force An-12 crash =

1968 aviation accident

Coordinates: 34°08′N 077°32′E

Indian Air Force Flight 203
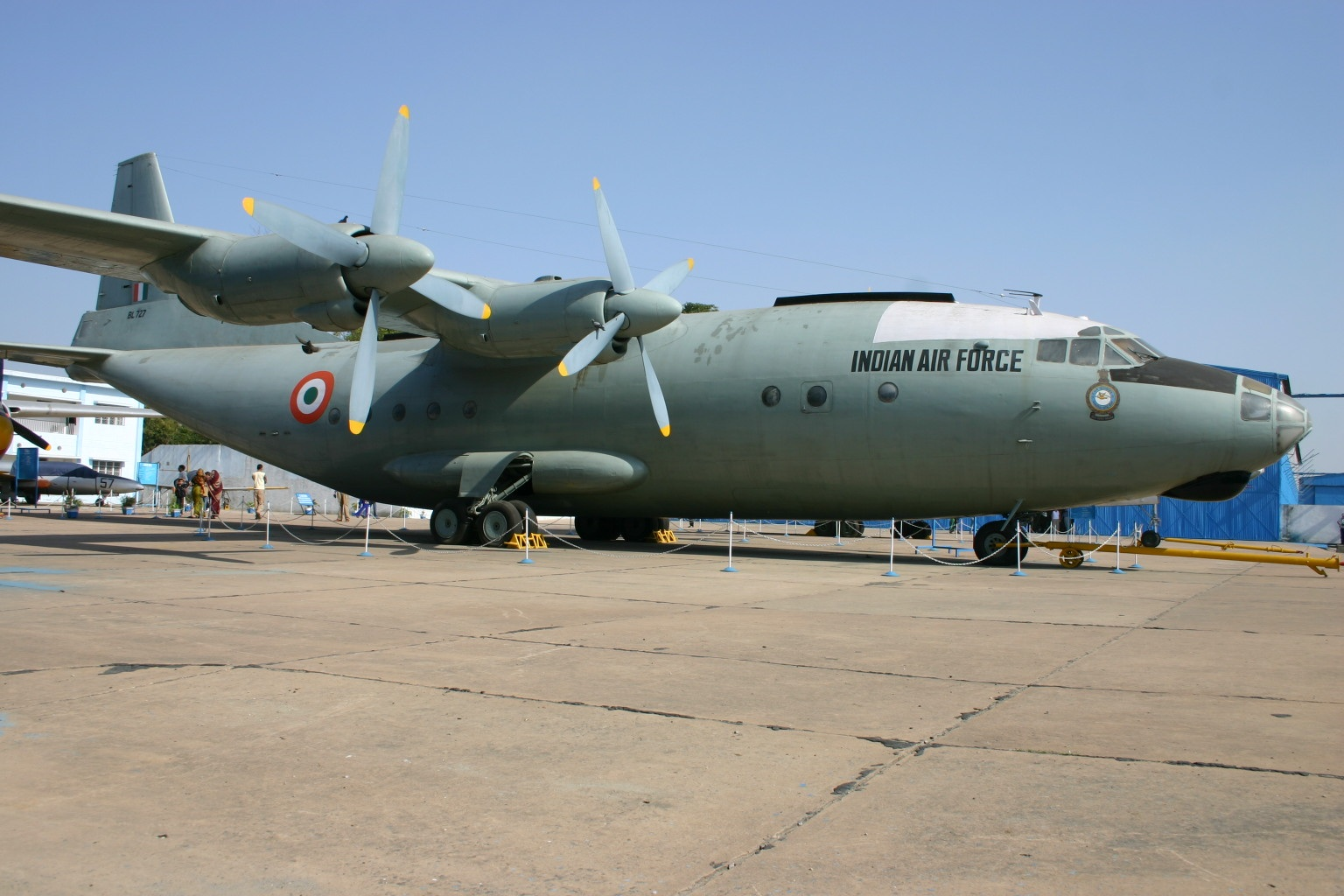
- An Indian Air Force Antonov An-12, similar to the crashed aircraft.

Occurrence
- Date: 7 February 1968
- Summary: Missing from 1968 till discovery of mortal remains of one of the victims in 2003; Crashed
- Site: Dhaka Glacier, India

Aircraft
- Aircraft type: Antonov An-12
- Operator: Indian Air Force
- Registration: BL534
- Flight origin: Chandigarh International Airport, Chandigarh
- Destination: Leh Airport, Leh
- Passengers: 98
- Crew: 4
- Fatalities: 102
- Missing: 93, 9 remains recovered
- Survivors: 0

On 7 February 1968, an Antonov An-12 turboprop transport aircraft of the Indian Air Force piloted by Flight Lieutenant Harkewal Singh and Squadron Leader Pran Nath Malhotra, disappeared while flying to Leh Airport from Chandigarh. Flight 203 was on approach to Leh when the pilot decided to turn back due to inclement weather, the aircraft then went missing with the last radio contact over the Rohtang Pass. It was declared missing after the failure to find the wreck.

== Recovery ==
In 2003, members of the Himalayan Mountaineering Institute who were trekking on the South Dakka Glacier came across the remains of a human body. The body was identified as Sepoy Beli Ram, a soldier of the Indian Army who was on the flight.

On 9 August 2007, an Indian Army expedition code named Operation Punaruthan-III, recovered three more bodies.

From 2003 till 2009, three search expeditions have been carried out with the recovery of four bodies. The crash location lies at a height of about 18,000 feet (5,500 m), at a gradient of 80 degrees.

On 21 July 2018, The Times of India reported that a mountaineering team at the Chandrabhaga-13 peak had found a body at the Dhaka glacier base camp. The team found wreckage of the plane along with the remains of a soldier on 11 July 2018. The team leader mentioned that the expedition was on a mission to clear up the trash left behind by climbers, and that it was organised by the Indian Mountaineering Foundation and the ONGC.

On 18 August 2019, after 13 days of search and recovery operation, a joint team of the Indian Army and the Indian Air Force recovered several parts of the aircraft like the aero engine, fuselage, electric circuits, propeller, fuel tank unit, air brake assembly and a cockpit door.

On 29 September 2024, the bodies of four more victims were found by the Dogra Scouts of the Indian Army and the Tiranga Mountain Rescue. Three out the four fatalities were identified as Malkhan Singh, Sepoy Narayan Singh and Craftsman Thomas Cheriyan.

== See also ==
- List of missing aircraft
- 1986 Indian Air Force An-32 disappearance
- 2016 Indian Air Force An-32 crash
- 2019 Indian Air Force An-32 crash
- 1963 Poonch Indian Air Force helicopter crash
