= 1986 Indian Air Force Antonov An-32 disappearance =

Airplane disappearance

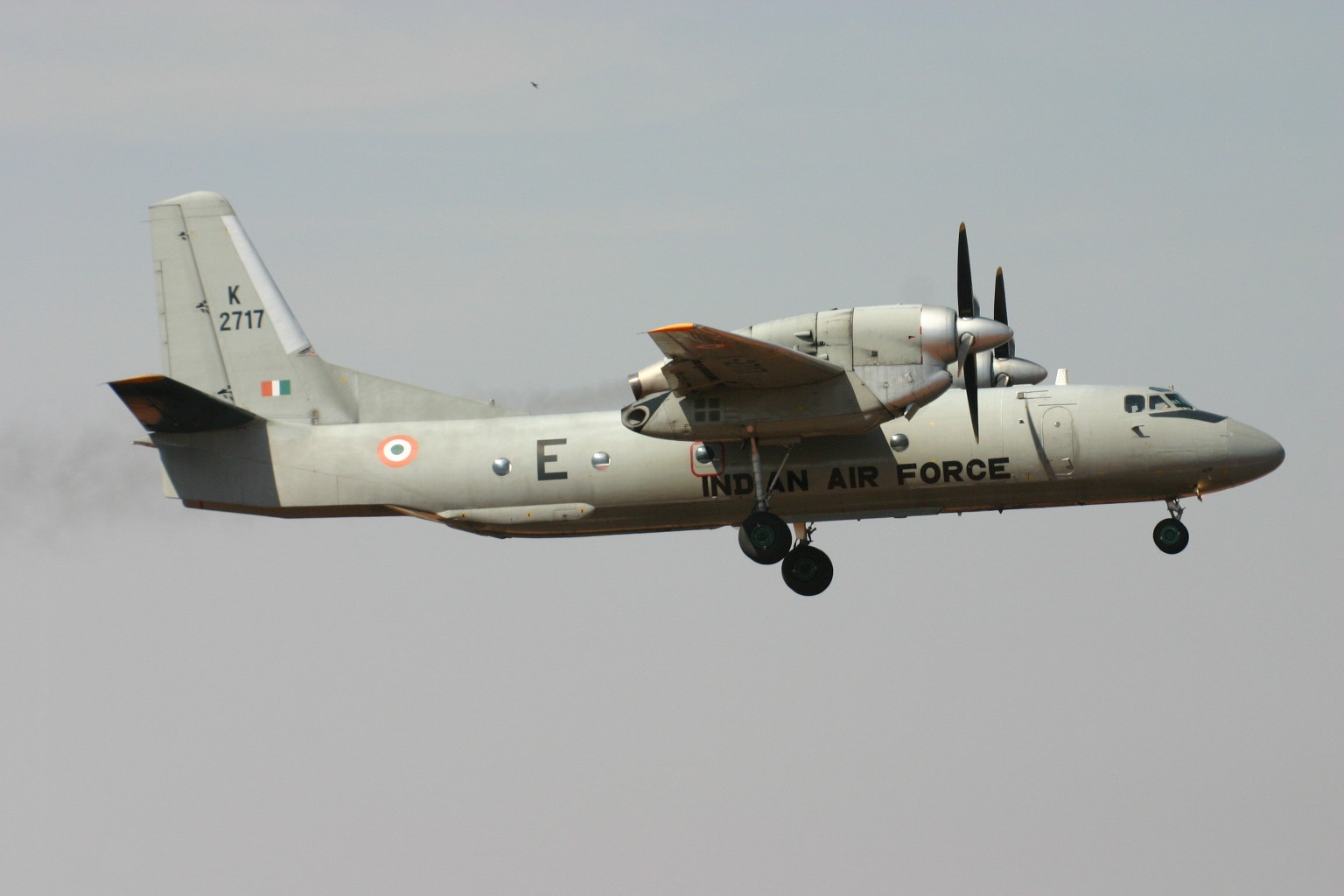
- An Indian Air Force Antonov An-32, similar to the missing aircraft.

Disappearance
- Date: 25 March 1986
- Summary: Disappeared over Arabian Sea
- Site: Arabian Sea

Aircraft
- Aircraft type: Antonov An-32
- Operator: Indian Air Force
- Registration: K2729
- Flight origin: Muscat-Seeb Airport, Oman
- Destination: Jamnagar Airport, Gujarat, India
- Occupants: 7
- Passengers: 3
- Crew: 4
- Fatalities: 7 (presumed)
- Missing: 7
- Survivors: 0 (presumed)

On 25 March 1986, an Antonov An-32 twin engine turboprop transport aircraft of the Indian Air Force disappeared while flying over the Arabian Sea. The aircraft was on a three-aircraft ferry flight from the Soviet Union en route to India from Muscat-Seeb Airport, Oman, to Jamnagar, Gujarat, in India. There were 7 people on board. The last contact with the aircraft was 1 hour and 18 minutes after takeoff.

The Indian Air Force has suffered other similar incidents, mainly involving Antonov An-32 aircraft in 2016 and 2019 (both later found).

== See also ==
- List of missing aircraft
