= 2019 Indian Air Force An-32 crash =

2019 aviation accident

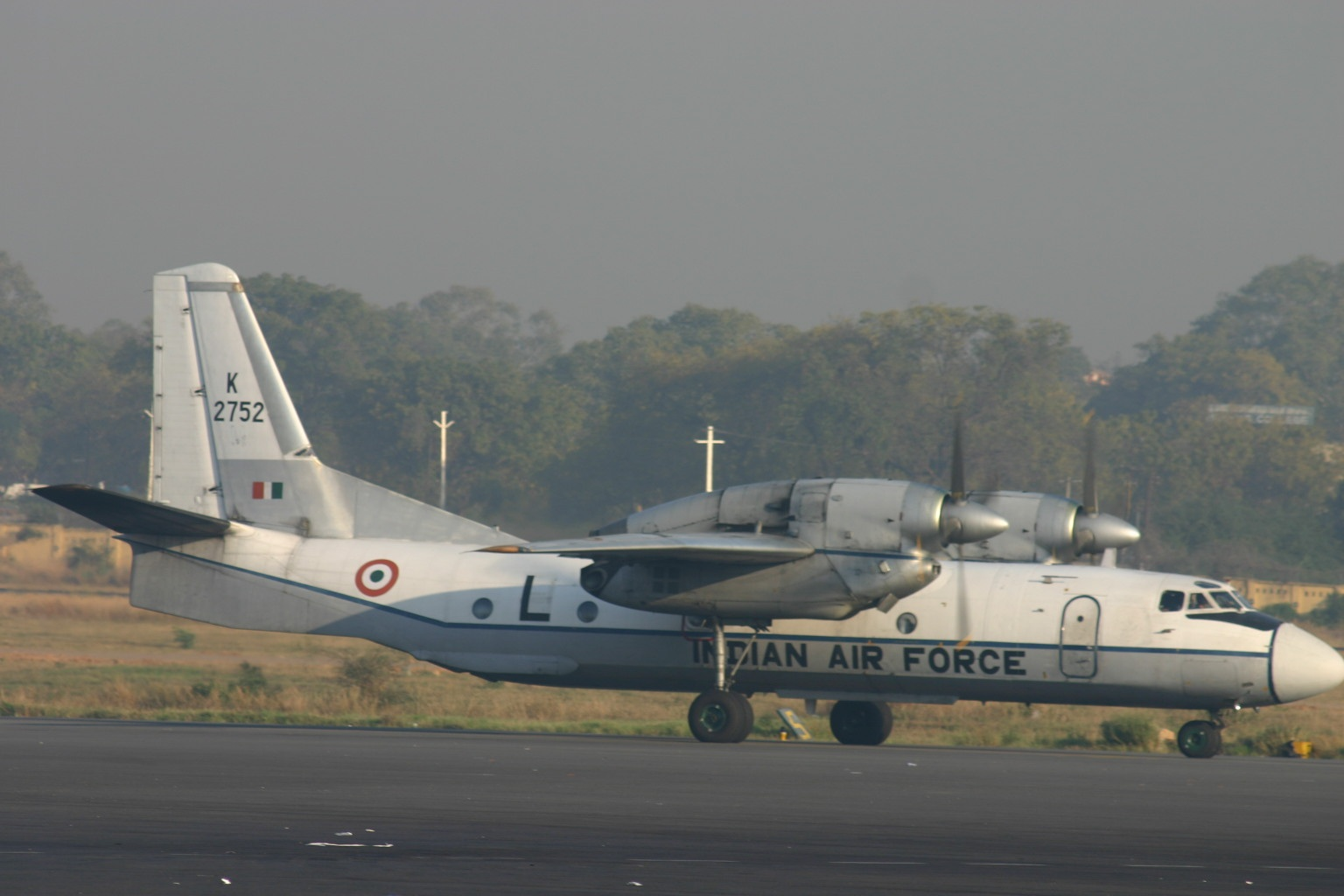
- K2752, the aircraft involved in the accident in 2005

Accident
- Date: 3 June 2019
- Summary: Crashed in hilly terrain
- Site: Near Pari hills close to Gatte village, Arunachal Pradesh, India

Aircraft
- Aircraft type: Antonov An-32
- Operator: Indian Air Force
- Registration: K2752
- Flight origin: Jorhat Airport Air Force Station, Assam, India
- Destination: Mechuka Advanced Landing Ground, Arunachal Pradesh, India
- Occupants: 13
- Fatalities: 13
- Survivors: 0

On 3 June 2019, an Antonov An-32 twin engine turboprop transport aircraft of the Indian Air Force en route from Jorhat Airport in Assam to Mechuka in Arunachal Pradesh lost contact with ground control about 33 minutes after takeoff. There were 13 people on board. After a week-long search operation, the wreckage with no survivors was found near Pari hills close to Gatte village in Arunachal Pradesh at the elevation of 12,000 feet (3,700 m).

The Indian Air Force has suffered other similar incidents, mainly involving Antonov An-32 aircraft in 1986 and 2016.

== Passengers ==
There were 13 Indian Air Force personnel, eight crew members and five passengers on board the aircraft. There were no survivors.

== Search operation ==
The Antonov An-32 twin engine turboprop transport aircraft was en route from Jorhat Airport in Assam to Mechuka Advanced Landing Ground in Arunachal Pradesh on 3 June 2019. The aircraft took off from Jorhat at 12:27 pm IST and lost contact with ground control at 1 pm IST, about 33 minutes after takeoff.

After eight days of search operation that had been hindered by poor weather, on 11 June 2019, the wreckage of the aircraft was found near Pari hills close to Gatte village, 16 kilometres (9.9 mi; 8.6 nmi) north of Lipo in Arunachal Pradesh, at 12,000 feet (3,700 m) elevation. The Indian Air Force had previously offered a cash reward of ₹5 lakh (US$5,200) for anyone who could share information on the aircraft. A fleet of Sukhoi-30, C-130J and An-32 aircraft and Mi-17 and ALH helicopters as well as the Indian Army, the Indo-Tibetan Border Police and the state police forces were deployed for the search operation. The Indian Navy's P-8I Neptune aircraft was also deployed on 4 June 2019. ISRO's Cartosat and RISAT satellites were also used.

On 12 June 2019, a team of 15 rescuers were airdropped near the crash site, but were unable to reach the location due to rough terrain and bad weather. The next day the rescue team reached the site and reported that there were no survivors, and that they had recovered the aircraft's flight recorders.

== See also ==
- 1963 Poonch Indian Air Force helicopter crash
- 2019 in India
