= 2016 Indian Air Force An-32 crash =

2016 Aviation accident

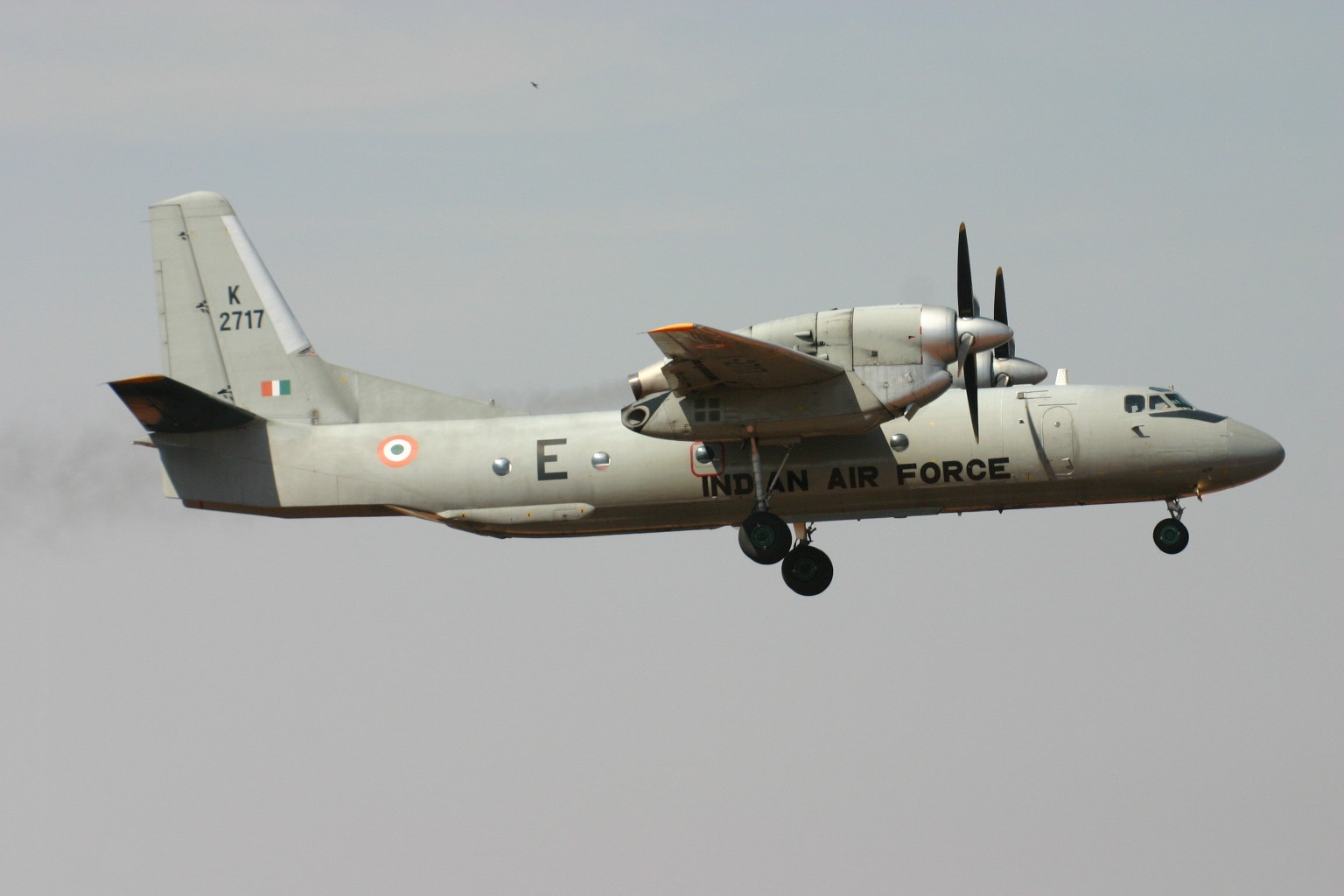
- An Indian Air Force Antonov An-32 similar to the ill-fated aircraft

Accident
- Date: 22 July 2016
- Summary: Sea ditching, cause undetermined
- Site: Bay of Bengal, India

Aircraft
- Aircraft type: Antonov An-32
- Operator: Indian Air Force
- Registration: K-2743
- Flight origin: Tambaram Air Force Station, Chennai, India
- Destination: Port Blair, Andaman Islands, India
- Occupants: 29
- Passengers: 23
- Crew: 6
- Fatalities: 29
- Survivors: 0

On 22 July 2016, an Antonov An-32 twin engine turboprop transport aircraft of the Indian Air Force crashed while flying over the Bay of Bengal. The aircraft was en route from Tambaram Air Force Station in the city of Chennai on the western coastline of the Bay of Bengal to Port Blair in the Andaman and Nicobar Islands. There were 29 people on board. Radar contact with the aircraft was lost at 9:12 am, 280 kilometres (170 mi) east of Chennai. No trace of the aircraft was found in the immediate aftermath. The search and rescue operation became India's largest search operation ever for a missing plane on the sea. In January 2024, wreckage discovered off the coast of Chennai was confirmed as belonging to the ill-fated aircraft, indicating it crashed into the sea with no survivors.

The Indian Air Force has suffered other similar incidents, mainly involving Antonov An-32 aircraft in 1986 and 2019.

== Passengers ==
There were 29 people on board the aircraft: six crew members; 11 Indian Air Force personnel; two Indian Army soldiers; one each from the Indian Navy and Indian Coast Guard; and eight defence civilians working with Naval Armament Depot (NAD). The civilians were from Visakhapatnam in Andhra Pradesh.

== Accident and aftermath ==
Origin and destination airports

The Antonov An-32 took off from Tambaram Air Force Station, Chennai at 08:30 local time on 22 July 2016. It was expected to land in Port Blair around 11:45 local time. The Indian Navy and the Indian Coast Guard launched a large search and rescue operation, using a submarine, 12 surface vessels and five aircraft.

On the third day after the disappearance, 16 ships, a submarine and six aircraft were deployed to search for the missing An-32 in the Bay of Bengal, about 150 nautical miles east of Chennai. On 1 August, it was confirmed that the aircraft had no underwater locator beacon (ULB). It did have two emergency locator transmitters (ELTs).

On 15 September 2016, the search and rescue mission was called off; all 29 people on board were presumed dead and their families were notified.

== Wreckage discovery ==
On 12 January 2024, the Indian government announced that an autonomous underwater vehicle found debris of the missing aircraft approximately 140 nautical miles from the Chennai coast. The statement further said there was no history of other missing aircraft in the area which pointed to the likelihood of it belonging to the An-32 which crashed. India's defence ministry said the aircraft was last visible on radar 280 km (170 mi) east of Chennai. It made a left bank and experienced a rapid decrease in altitude from 23,000 ft (7,000 m).

The wreckage was discovered by an unmanned autonomous submarine that was imported from Norway by the National Institute of Oceanic Studies for research purposes. The wreckage was found at a depth of 3,400 metres using multiple payloads, including a multi-beam sonar, synthetic aperture sonar and high-resolution photography.

== See also ==
- List of missing aircraft
