= List of accidents and incidents involving airliners in the United States =

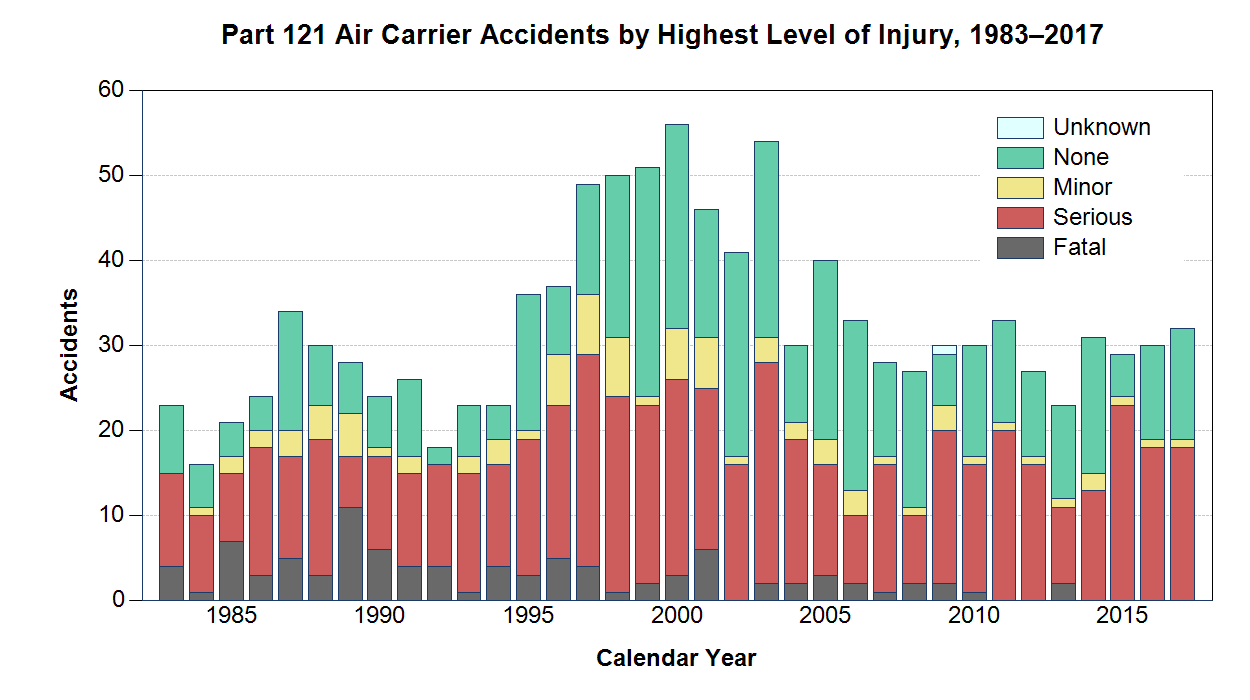
US air carrier accidents by severity of injury, 1983–2017

This list of accidents and incidents on airliners in the United States summarizes airline accidents that occurred within the territories claimed by the United States, with information on airline company with flight number, date, and cause.

This list is a subset of the list of accidents and incidents involving airliners by location.

It is also available grouped:

- by year as List of accidents and incidents involving commercial aircraft
- by airline as List of accidents and incidents involving airliners by airline
- by fatalities as List of fatal accidents and incidents involving commercial aircraft in the United States

Click a link below to jump straight to a particular U.S. State or Territory:

- Alabama
- Alaska
- American Samoa
- Arizona
- Arkansas
- California
- Colorado
- Connecticut
- Delaware
- D.C.
- Florida
- Georgia
- Guam
- Hawaii
- Idaho
- Illinois
- Indiana
- Iowa
- Kansas
- Kentucky
- Louisiana
- Maine
- Maryland
- Massachusetts
- Michigan
- Minnesota
- Mississippi
- Missouri
- Montana
- Nebraska
- Nevada
- New Hampshire
- New Jersey
- New Mexico
- New York
- North Carolina
- North Dakota
- Ohio
- Oklahoma
- Oregon
- Pennsylvania
- Puerto Rico
- Rhode Island
- South Carolina
- South Dakota
- Tennessee
- Texas
- U.S. Virgin Islands
- Utah
- Vermont
- Virginia
- Washington
- West Virginia
- Wisconsin
- Wyoming

== Alabama ==
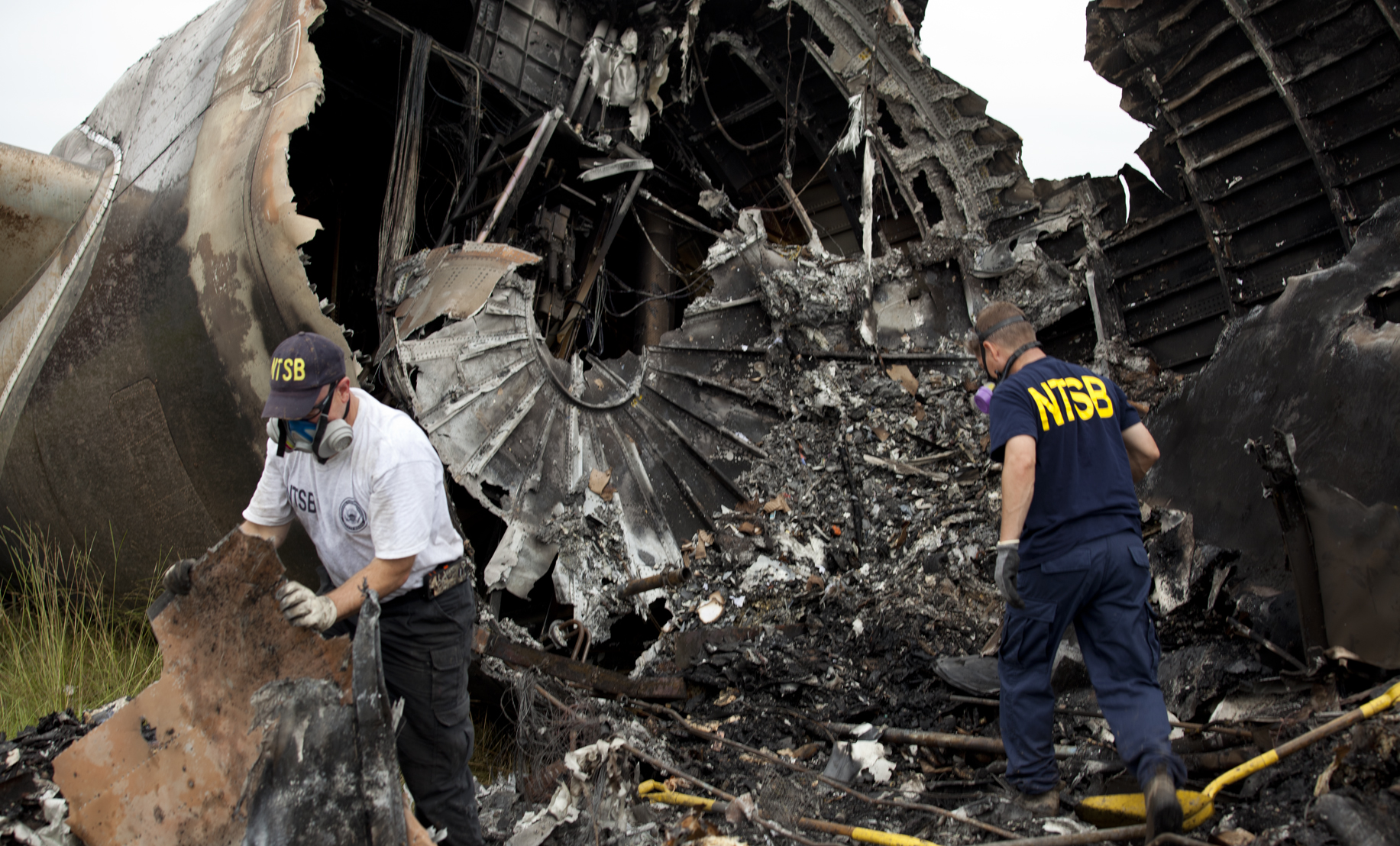
Investigators at the crash site of UPS Flight 1354

- January 6, 1946 – Pennsylvania Central Airlines Flight 105, a Douglas DC-3, crashed while attempting to land at Birmingham Municipal Airport. The three pilots were killed.
- April 9, 1990 – Atlantic Southeast Airlines Flight 2254, an Embraer EMB 120 operating for Delta Connection, collided with a Civil Air Patrol Cessna 172 over Gadsden. Both individuals on board the Cessna were killed, while Flight 2254 was able to land safely at Northeast Alabama Regional Airport.
- June 8, 1992 – GP Express Flight 861, a Beech 99, crashed in Anniston after the crew lost spatial and situational awareness while attempting to land. Two passengers and the captain were killed.
- July 10, 1991 – L'Express Airlines Flight 508, a Beech 99, crashed in Birmingham while attempting to land at Birmingham Municipal Airport during a severe thunderstorm, killing 13 people. It remains the deadliest commercial aviation accident in Alabama history.
- August 14, 2013 – UPS Airlines Flight 1354, an Airbus A300, crashed short of Birmingham–Shuttlesworth International Airport due to pilot error and pilot fatigue. Both crew members were killed.

== Alaska ==
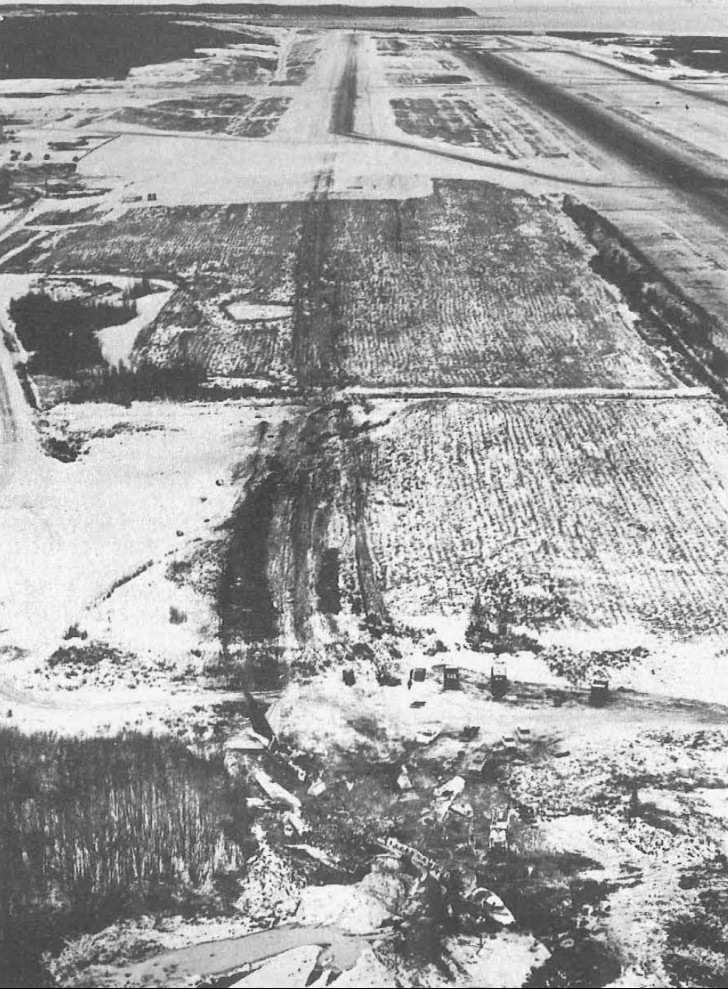
Crash site and wreckage of Capitol Airways Flight C2C3/26

- October 26, 1947 – Pan Am Flight 923, a Douglas DC-4, crashed into the side of Tamgas Mountain near Annette Island, killing all 18 on board.
- March 12, 1948 – Northwest Orient Airlines Flight 4422, a Douglas C-54, crashed into Mount Sanford, killing all 30 on board. The wreckage was lost for nearly fifty years until being located in 1997. The exact cause of the accident was never determined.
- July 21, 1961 – Alaska Airlines Flight 779, a Douglas DC-6, crashed short of the runway at Shemya Air Force Base, killing all 6 crew members.
- June 3, 1963 – Northwest Orient Airlines Flight 293, a Douglas DC-7, was a Military Air Transport Service charter flight carrying 101 servicemen and their families that crashed into the sea off the Alaska. The cause of the accident was never determined, and no bodies were ever recovered.
- December 2, 1968 – Wien Consolidated Airlines Flight 55, a Fairchild F-27, crashed into Pedro Bay after encountering extreme air turbulence and suffering structural failure. All 39 on board were killed.
- December 26, 1968 – Pan Am Flight 799, a Boeing 707, stalled after take-off from Elmendorf Air Force Base and crashed due to an incorrect flap setting. All three crew members died.
- November 27, 1970 – Capitol International Airways Flight C2C3/26, a Douglas DC-8, overran the runway at Anchorage International Airport, killing 47 of the 229 people on board.
- September 4, 1971 – Alaska Airlines Flight 1866, a Boeing 727, crashed into a mountain in the Chilkat Range near Juneau, killing all 111 on board. It was the first fatal jet airliner crash for Alaska Airlines.
- August 30, 1975 – Wien Air Alaska Flight 99, a Fairchild F-27, crashed into Sevuokuk Mountain while on approach to Gambell, through heavy fog. All 10 people on board were killed on impact and in the subsequent fire.
- April 5, 1976 – Alaska Airlines Flight 60, a Boeing 727, overran the runway at Ketchikan Airport, resulting in the death of one passenger.
- June 8, 1983 – Reeve Aleutian Airways Flight 8, a Lockheed L-188, suffered a propeller detachment, striking the fuselage and damaging flight controls. The plane landed safely at Anchorage International Airport.
- December 23, 1983 – the Anchorage runway collision occurred when Korean Air Lines Flight 084, a DC-10 freighter, collided with a SouthCentral Air Piper PA-31 on the runway at Anchorage International Airport. The Korean Air Lines pilots had become disoriented and attempted to take off from the wrong runway. Both aircraft were destroyed, but all 12 occupants of both aircraft survived.
- December 15, 1989 – KLM Flight 867, a Boeing 747-400, lost all four engines after flying through volcanic ash from Mount Redoubt, but managed to land safely and without loss of life at Anchorage International Airport.
- March 31, 1993 – Japan Air Lines Cargo Flight 46E, a Boeing 747 operated by Evergreen International, experienced a number-two engine detachment on while climbing over Alaska. The pilots did lose some control, but soon made a successful emergency landing at Anchorage International Airport, with all three pilots surviving.
- October 9, 2002 – Northwest Airlines Flight 85, a Boeing 747-400, experienced a severe rudder hardover event that forced it to divert to Anchorage. As a result of the incident, an airworthiness directive was issued to prevent further such events.
- October 17, 2019 – PenAir Flight 3296, a Saab 2000, ran off the end of the runway at Unalaska Airport. One passenger was killed by a propeller blade.
- March 8, 2013 – Alaska Central Express Flight 51, a Beech 1900, crashed into Muklung Hills, killing both crew members.
- May 13, 2019 – the 2019 Alaska mid-air collision occurred when a Mountain Air Service DHC-3 and a Taquan Air DHC-2 collided over George Inlet. All 5 on board the Mountain Air Service were killed; the Taquan Air flight made a forced landing on the inlet, killing 1 person.
- April 23, 2024 – An Alaska Air Fuel Douglas C-54D crashed shortly after takeoff from Fairbanks International Airport, killing both crew members.
- February 6, 2025 – Bering Air Flight 445, a Cessna 208, crashed into ice in the Norton Sound, killing all 10 on board.
- August 20, 2026 – Security Aviation Flight 45, a Cessna 441 Conquest II, crashed on approach to Cape Newenham LRRS Airport, killing all eight people on board.

== Arizona ==
- June 30, 1956 – the 1956 Grand Canyon mid-air collision occurred when United Airlines Flight 718, a Douglas DC-7, and TWA Flight 2, a Lockheed Super Constellation, collided over the Grand Canyon, killing all 128 aboard both aircraft. A Civil Aeronautics Board investigation determined that the aircraft had been flying in each other's blind spots and did not see each other prior to impact.
- June 18, 1986 – the 1986 Grand Canyon mid-air collision occurred when Grand Canyon Airlines Flight 6, a Twin Otter, collided with a Bell 206 helicopter over Grand Canyon National Park. All 25 passengers and crew on board the two aircraft were killed.
- April 1, 2011 – Southwest Airlines Flight 812, a Boeing 737-300, suffered rapid depressurization after a hole opened in the aircraft skin in-flight. The aircraft made an emergency landing at Yuma International Airport. A manufacturing flaw in the Boeing 737 was found to contribute to the accident.

== Arkansas ==
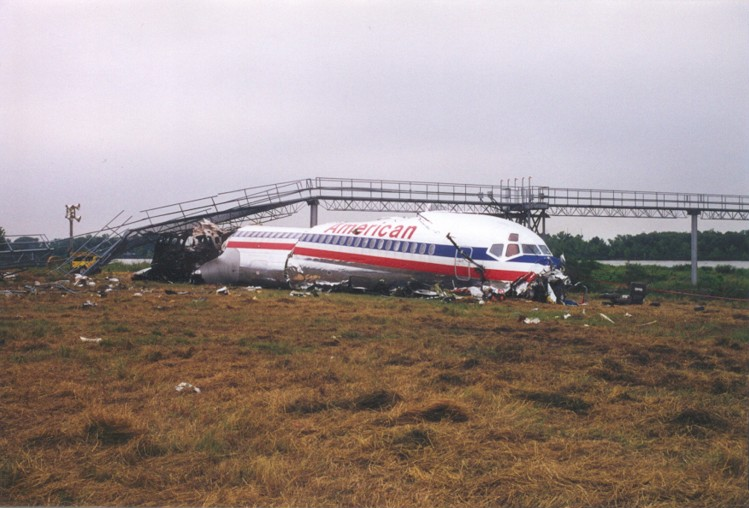
American Airlines Flight 1420

- January 14, 1936 – American Airlines Flight 1, a Douglas DC-2 crashed into a swamp near Goodwin, killing all 17 people on board. At the time, it was the worst civil plane crash on U.S. soil. As of 2025, it remains the deadliest crash in Arkansas state history.
- September 27, 1973 – Texas International Airlines Flight 655, a Convair 660, crashed into Black Fork Mountain, killing all 8 passengers and 3 crew. The pilots had descended below the minimum altitude for the area while attempting to circumnavigate a thunderstorm.
- April 7, 1994 – Federal Express Flight 705, a DC-10, experienced an attempted hijacking in the air over Arkansas by an off-duty pilot. A brawl broke out, and despite serious injuries, the crew was able to make an emergency landing at Memphis International Airport in Tennessee.
- June 1, 1999 – American Airlines Flight 1420, an MD-82, overran the runway while attempting to land at Little Rock National Airport. The pilots attempted to land though heavy winds and wind shear that exceeded the safety limits for the aircraft. The captain and 10 passengers were killed on impact.

== California ==
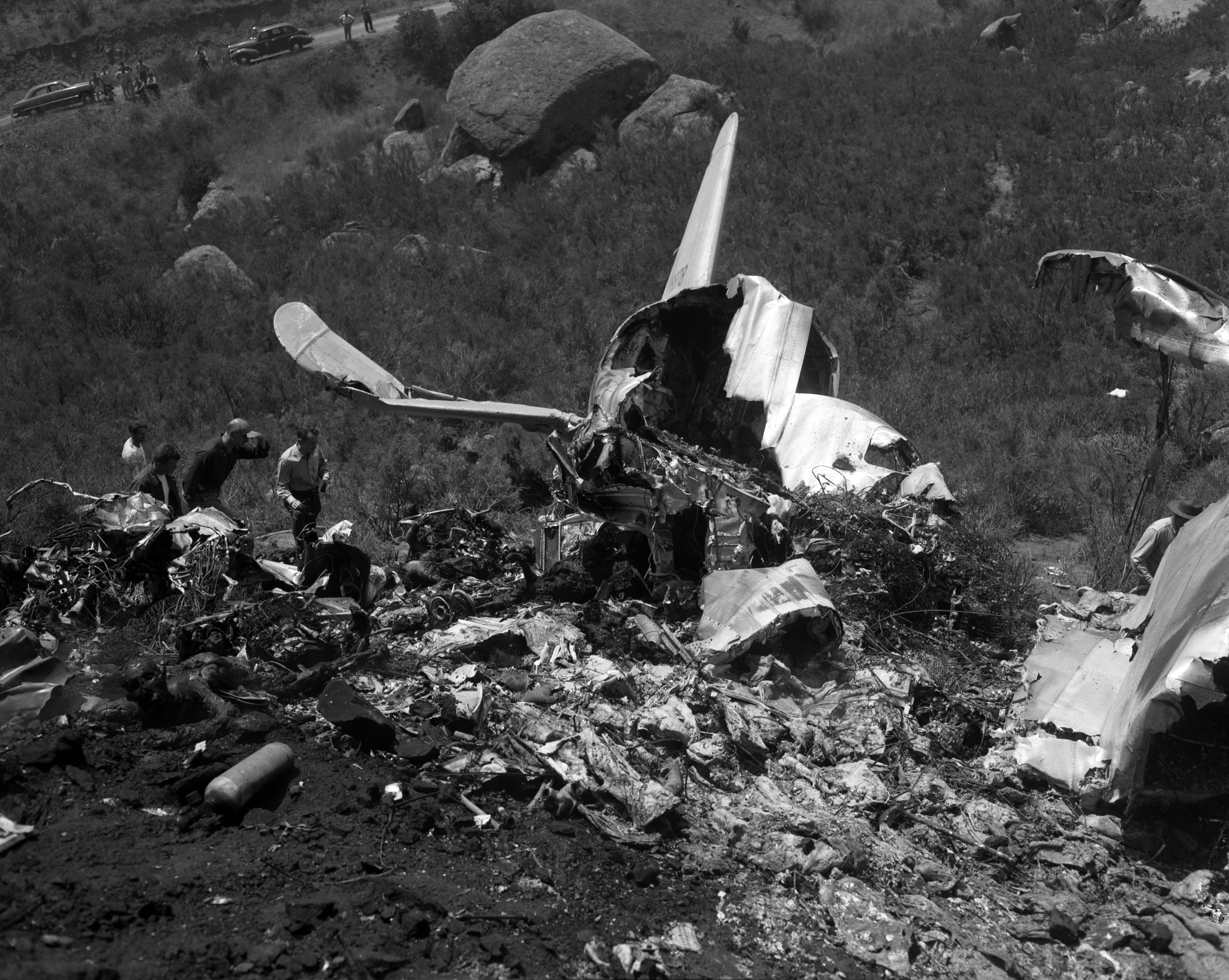
Standard Air Lines Flight 897R

- December 27, 1936 – United Air Lines Flight 34, a Boeing 247, crashed into Rice Canyon, killing all 12 passengers and crew.
- January 12, 1937 – Western Air Express Flight 7, a Boeing 247, crashed into Pinetos Peak northeast of San Fernando, killing 5, including adventurer and documentary filmmaker Martin Johnson.
- March 1, 1938 – TWA Flight 8, a Douglas DC-2, crashed into Yosemite National Park while attempting to divert to Fresno during severe weather, killing all 9 on board.
- October 23, 1942 – American Airlines Flight 28, a Douglas DC-3, collided with a US Army Air Corps B-34 over Chino Canyon, after the army pilot's reckless flying severed the airliner's tail. All 12 on board Flight 28 were killed; both army pilots survived.
- January 21, 1943 – Pan Am Flight 1104, a Martin M-130, crashed into a mountain near Boonville, California, killing all 19 on board, including Rear Admiral Robert Henry English.
- January 10, 1945 – American Airlines Flight 6001, a DC-3, crashed during a go-around from Burbank Airport, killing all 24 on board.
- January 28, 1948 – an Airline Transport Carriers DC-3 crashed into the Diablo Mountains, killing all 32 on board.
- July 12, 1949 – Standard Air Lines Flight 897R, a Curtiss C-46, crashed on approach to Burbank Airport, killing 35.
- December 7, 1949 – an Arrow Air DC-3 crashed into terrain on approach to Sacramento, killing all 9 on board.
- August 24, 1951 – United Air Lines Flight 615, a Douglas DC-6, crashed into mountainous terrain 15 miles (24 km) southeast of Oakland, killing all 50 on board.
- March 20, 1953 – Transocean Air Lines Flight 942, a Douglas DC-4, lost control and crashed in Oakland, killing all 35 on board.
- April 20, 1953 – Western Air Lines Flight 636, a Douglas DC-6, crashed into the San Francisco Bay, killing 8 of the 10 people on board.
- October 29, 1953 – BCPA Flight 304, a Douglas DC-6, crashed during its initial approach towards San Francisco International Airport, killing all 19 people on board, including American pianist William Kapell.
- May 7, 1964 – Pacific Air Lines Flight 773, a Fairchild F-27, crashed near San Ramon, California, after a passenger shot the flight crew and killed himself, causing the plane to crash. All 44 on board were killed.
- December 24, 1964 – Flying Tiger Line Flight 282, a Lockheed L-1049, crashed near the top of Sweeney Ridge in San Bruno, killing all 3 crew members.
- June 28, 1965 – Pan Am Flight 843, a Boeing 707, suffered an uncontained engine failure after takeoff from San Francisco International Airport, but was able to make an emergency landing at nearby Travis Air Force Base.
- December 25, 1965 – Japan Air Lines Flight 813, a DC-8, suffered an uncontained engine failure after departing from San Francisco. The aircraft made an emergency landing at Oakland San Francisco Bay Airport without injury.
- May 22, 1968 – Los Angeles Airways Flight 841, a Sikorsky S-61, crashed in Paramount after a mechanical failure of the rotorblade. All 23 on board were killed.
- August 14, 1968 – Los Angeles Airways Flight 417, a Sikorsky S-61, crashed in Compton when a rotor blade detached from the helicopter. All 21 on board were killed.
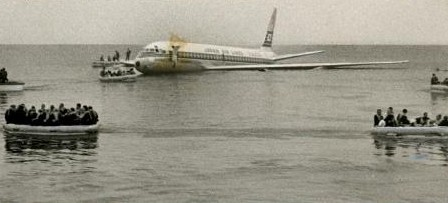
- Japan Air Lines Flight 2
  November 22, 1968 – Japan Air Lines Flight 2, a Douglas DC-8, crashed into the San Francisco Bay while attempting to land at San Francisco International Airport. No one was injured.
- January 13, 1969 – Scandinavian Airlines System Flight 933, a DC-8, crashed in Santa Monica Bay, about 6 nautical miles (11 km) west of Los Angeles International Airport. 15 of the 45 on board were killed.
- January 18, 1969 – United Air Lines Flight 266, a Boeing 727, crashed into Santa Monica Bay four minutes after take-off, killing all 38 on board.
- February 18, 1969 – Hawthorne Nevada Airlines Flight 708, a Douglas DC-3 crashed into the tallest mountain in the contiguous United States, Mount Whitney, near Lone Pine, killing all 35 passengers and crew on board.
- June 6, 1971 – Hughes Airwest Flight 706, a McDonnell Douglas DC-9, collided with a F-4 Phantom and crashed into the San Gabriel Mountains near Duarte, California, killing all 49 people aboard. The Phantom's radar intercept officer ejected from the aircraft and survived, but the pilot was unable and was killed.
- July 30, 1971 – Pan Am Flight 845, a Boeing 747 (N747PA), struck the approach light structure navigational aids at the end of the runway on takeoff from San Francisco International Airport. The aircraft made a safe return to San Francisco; 27 people were injured during the evacuation.
- March 13, 1974 – Sierra Pacific Airlines Flight 802, a Convair 440, crashed after takeoff from Eastern Sierra Regional Airport, killing all 36 people on board.
- January 9, 1975 – Golden West Airlines Flight 261, a Twin Otter, collided in midair with a Cessna 150 near Whittier, California, killing all 14 on both aircraft.
- April 12, 1977 – Delta Air Lines Flight 1080, a Lockheed L-1011, suffered a mechanical failure of the elevator system, causing it to jam in the fully upwards position, causing the nose to pitch up heavily and nearly stall. The pitch was managed by reducing power to the under-wing engines but not the tail engine, and by moving all passengers to the front of the aircraft. The aircraft landed safely at Los Angeles International Airport.
- September 25, 1978 – PSA Flight 182, a Boeing 727, collided with a Cessna 172 on approach to San Diego Airport, killing all 144 people on both aircraft. It is the deadliest aircraft disaster in California history, and at the time, the deadliest aircraft incident in the United States.
- August 24, 1984 – the San Luis Obispo mid-air collision occurred when Wings West Airlines Flight 628, a Beech 99, collided with a Rockwell Commander 112 near San Luis Obispo, killing all 17 on board both aircraft.
- February 19, 1985 – China Airlines Flight 006, a Boeing 747SP, suffered an in-flight upset above the Pacific Ocean and dove 30,000 feet before recovering. It landed safely at San Francisco International Airport.
- August 31, 1986 – Aeroméxico Flight 498, a McDonnell Douglas DC-9, collided with a Piper Archer on approach to LAX. All 64 people on both aircraft were killed. The stricken aircraft plummeted into Cerritos, California, killing an additional 15 on the ground.
- December 7, 1987 – PSA Flight 1771, a BAE 146, crashed near Cayucos, California, after being hijacked and deliberately crashed by a disgruntled former airline employee, killing all 43 on board.
- February 1, 1991 – the Los Angeles runway collision occurred when USAir Flight 1493, a Boeing 737-300, while attempting to land at Los Angeles International Airport collided with SkyWest Flight 5569, a Fairchild Metroliner, which was awaiting take off on the same runway. All 12 people aboard the SkyWest flight were killed, as were 23 of the 89 passengers on the USAir flight.
- February 14, 1992 – Some 75 passengers on board Aerolíneas Argentinas Flight 386 fell ill with cholera after eating contaminated shrimp served on the flight between Lima, Peru, and Los Angeles. One person died.
- June 28, 1998 – United Airlines Flight 863, a Boeing 747-400, nearly flew into San Bruno Mountain while recovering from an engine failure after take-off from San Francisco International Airport. The plane landed safely.
- January 31, 2000 – Alaska Airlines Flight 261, a McDonnell Douglas MD-83, crashed into the Pacific Ocean about 2.7 miles (4.3 km) north of Anacapa Island, California. A jackscrew of the horizontal stabilizer failed, causing a loss of control. All 88 occupants were killed.
- February 16, 2000 – Emery Worldwide Flight 17, a DC-8 freighter, lost control after take-off and crashed into an automobile salvage yard due to faulty maintenance. All three crew members died.
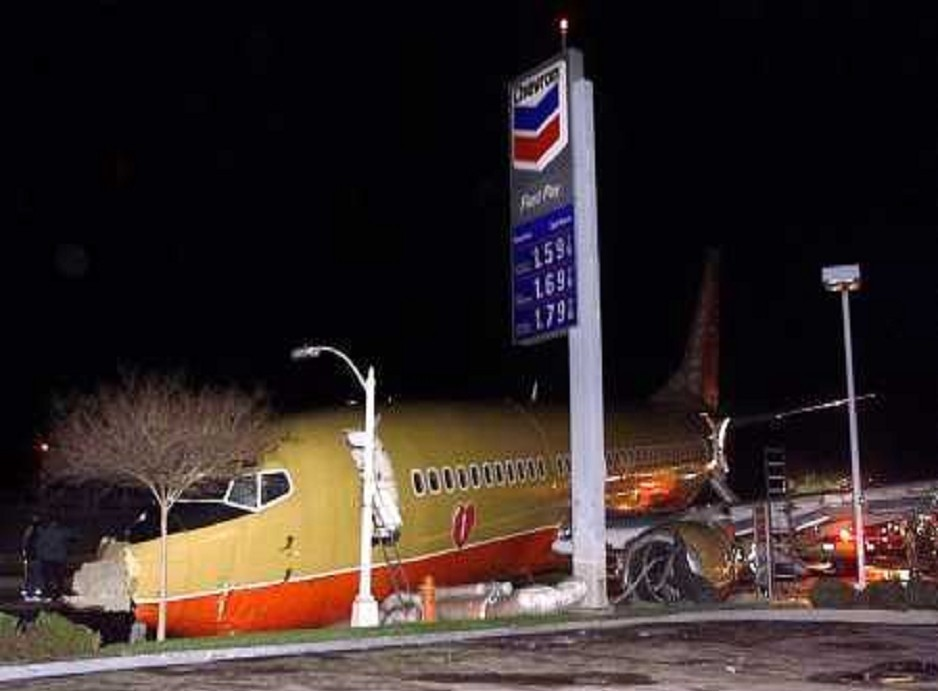
- Southwest Airlines Flight 1455
  March 5, 2000 – Southwest Airlines Flight 1455, a Boeing 737-300, overran the runway upon landing at Burbank-Glendale-Pasadena Airport. 44 people were injured.
- June 29, 2004 – Northwest Airlines Flight 327, a Boeing 757, was the subject of a suspected hijacking en route to Los Angeles. Journalist Annie Jacobsen, among other passengers, believed a group of Syrian passengers were acting suspiciously. She wrote a series of articles, in which she stated she believed the incident was a terror attempt or a dry run, however the men were investigated by the FBI and FAMS, and no evidence of terrorist activity was found.
- February 20, 2005 – British Airways Flight 268, a Boeing 747-400, suffered an engine failure on takeoff from Los Angeles. The flight continued across the Atlantic before making an emergency landing at Manchester Airport, sparking a disagreement between the Federal Aviation Administration and the Civil Aviation Authority on whether the flight should have continued.
- September 21, 2005 – JetBlue Flight 292, an Airbus A320, executed an emergency landing at Los Angeles International Airport after the nose wheel gear jammed in an abnormal position. No one was injured.
- July 6, 2013 – Asiana Airlines Flight 214, a Boeing 777, crashed upon landing at San Francisco International Airport. Of the 307 people aboard, three were killed and 181 injured.
- July 7, 2017 – Air Canada Flight 759 mistakenly lined up with a taxiway on final approach and narrowly avoided collision with four aircraft awaiting departure at San Francisco International Airport. The plane initiated a go-around, and passed within 14 feet of the tail of one aircraft.
- January 14, 2020 – Delta Air Lines Flight 89, a Boeing 777, suffered a compressor stall shortly after takoeff from Los Angeles International Airport. The pilots proceeded to dump fuel over populated areas of Los Angeles, including 6 schools. 56 people on the ground suffered skin and lung irritation.

== Colorado ==
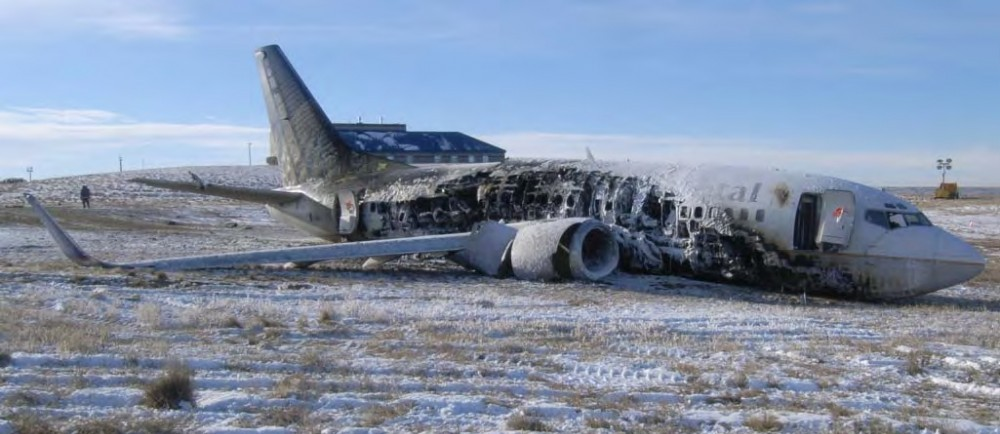
Continental Airlines Flight 1404

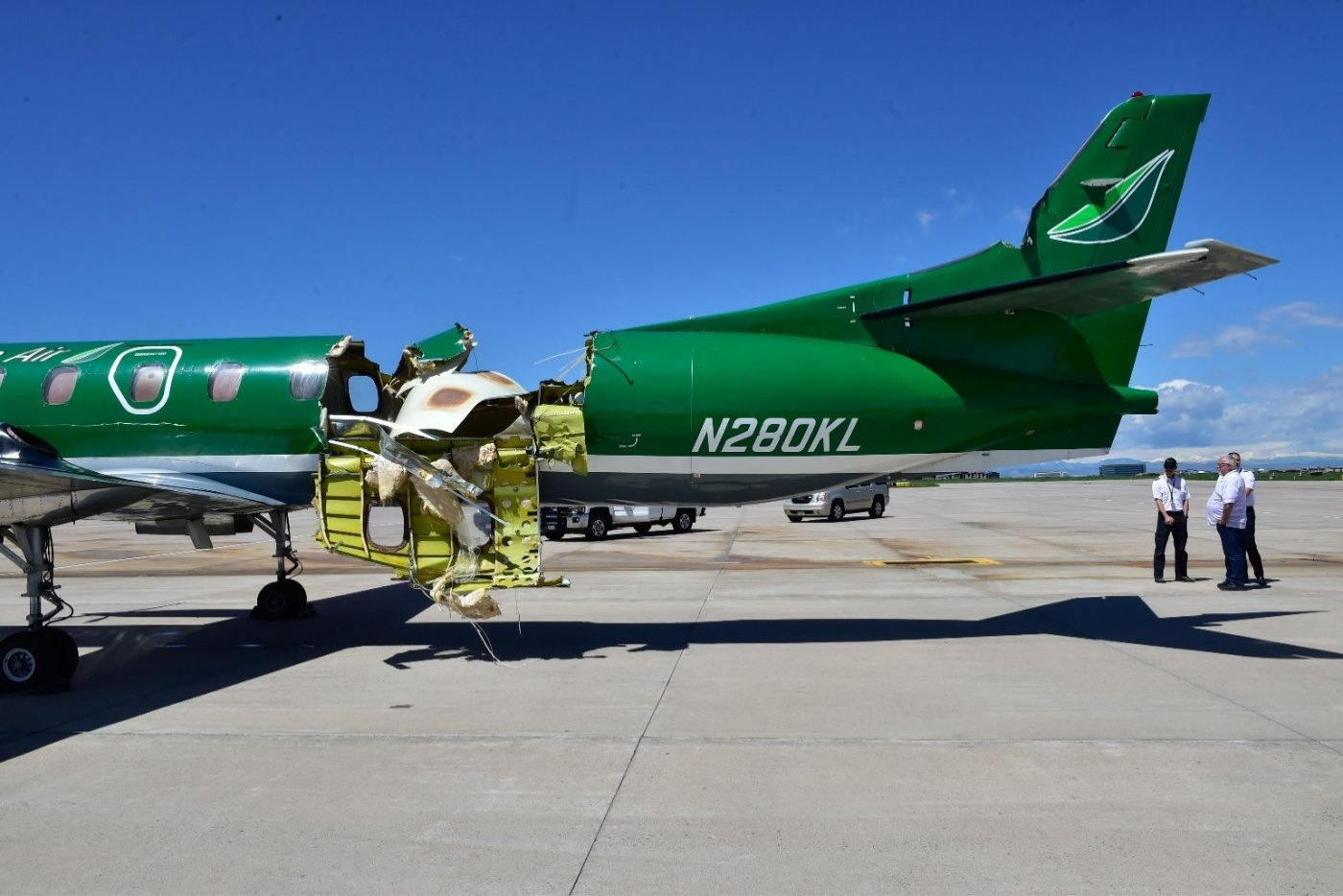
Damage to Key Lime Air Flight 970

- November 1, 1955 – United Air Lines Flight 629, a Douglas DC-6, exploded over Longmont, Colorado, due to a bomb placed on the aircraft by John Gilbert Graham as part of an attempt to collect insurance money. All 44 on board were killed.
- January 11, 1961 – United Air Lines Flight 859, a Douglas DC-8, veered off the runway during landing at Stapleton International Airport, Denver. The aircraft slammed into several airport vehicles, including construction equipment, and caught fire, killing 18 (including one on the ground) and injuring 104 of the 122 people on board.
- October 2, 1970 – a Martin 4-0-4 operated by Golden Eagle Aviation, carrying the Wichita State University football team, crashed in Clear Creek County, killing 31 of the 40 people on board.
- March 13, 1978 – United Airlines Flight 696, a Boeing 727 was hijacked and was flown to Oakland where the passengers and cabin crew were released. The hijacker demanded to fly to Cuba, but agreed to fly to Denver to refuel. Thomas surrendered 95 minutes after landing, after the flight crew had escaped through the cockpit windows.
- November 1, 1987 – Continental Airlines Flight 1713, a Douglas DC-9, crashed on take-off in a snowstorm from the Denver Stapleton International Airport . The crash resulted in the deaths of 28 of the aircraft's occupants, while 54 survived.
- March 3, 1991 – United Airlines Flight 585, a Boeing 737, lost control crashed while attempting to land at Colorado Springs Airport, killing all 25 on board. The aircraft suffered a rudder hardover, causing it to roll over and dive into the ground.
- December 20, 2008 – Continental Airlines Flight 1404, a Boeing 737-500, veered off the runway while taking off from Denver, resulting in two critical injuries and 36 noncritical injuries. The aircraft was written off.
- April 7, 2010 – United Airlines Flight 663 was the location of a "minor international incident", involving a Qatari diplomat on the leg of the flight from Ronald Reagan Washington National Airport to Denver International Airport. The diplomat prompted a midair terrorism alert after smoking in the airplane lavatory, which led the Qatari government to recall him two days later.
- May 12, 2021 – Key Lime Air Flight 970, a Fairchild Metro, collided with a Cirrus SR22 while on approach to Centennial Airport. The Metroliner landed safely with a large portion of fuselage missing, and the Cirrus deployed its parachute system safely.
- February 20, 2021 – United Airlines Flight 328, a Boeing 777, suffered an uncontained engine failure and landed safely at Denver International Airport.

== Connecticut ==
- June 7, 1971 – Allegheny Airlines Flight 485, a Convair 580, crashed on approach to Tweed New Haven Airport; 28 passengers and two crew members were killed.
- November 12, 1995 – American Airlines Flight 1572, a McDonnell Douglas MD-83, struck trees and an ILS antenna while attempting to land at Bradley International Airport due to an incorrect altimeter setting. 1 passenger suffered minor injuries.

== District of Columbia ==
- January 13, 1982 – Air Florida Flight 90, a Boeing 737, crashed in the Potomac River in 1982 after hitting the 14th Street Bridge shortly after takeoff from Washington National Airport in Arlington County, Virginia, during icy conditions. The captain declined to deice the aircraft after waiting on the runway for nearly an hour and did not turn on the engine deicers, causing a fatal buildup of ice on the wings and insufficient engine thrust. 74 people were killed; 4 passengers and a flight attendant survived.
- January 29, 2025 – the Potomac River mid-air collision occurred when American Eagle Flight 5342, a Bombardier CRJ-701ER operated by PSA Airlines, collided with a U.S. Military Sikorsky UH-60 while on approach to runway 33 into Washington National Airport in Arlington County, Virginia. There were 64 passengers and crew aboard Flight 5342, and 2 pilots on the helicopter. There were no survivors on both aircraft.

== Florida ==
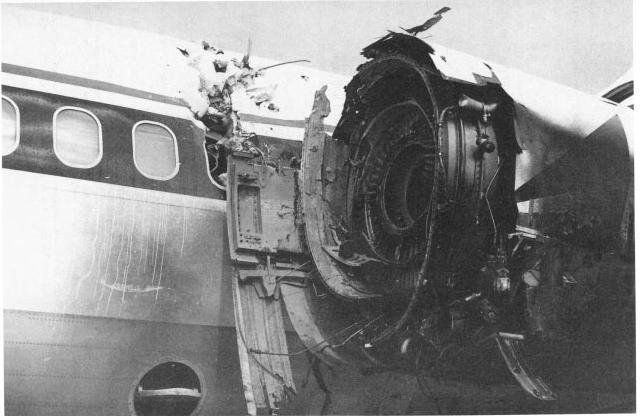
The engine of Delta Air Lines Flight 1288 after it experienced catastrophic turbine failure on July 6, 1996

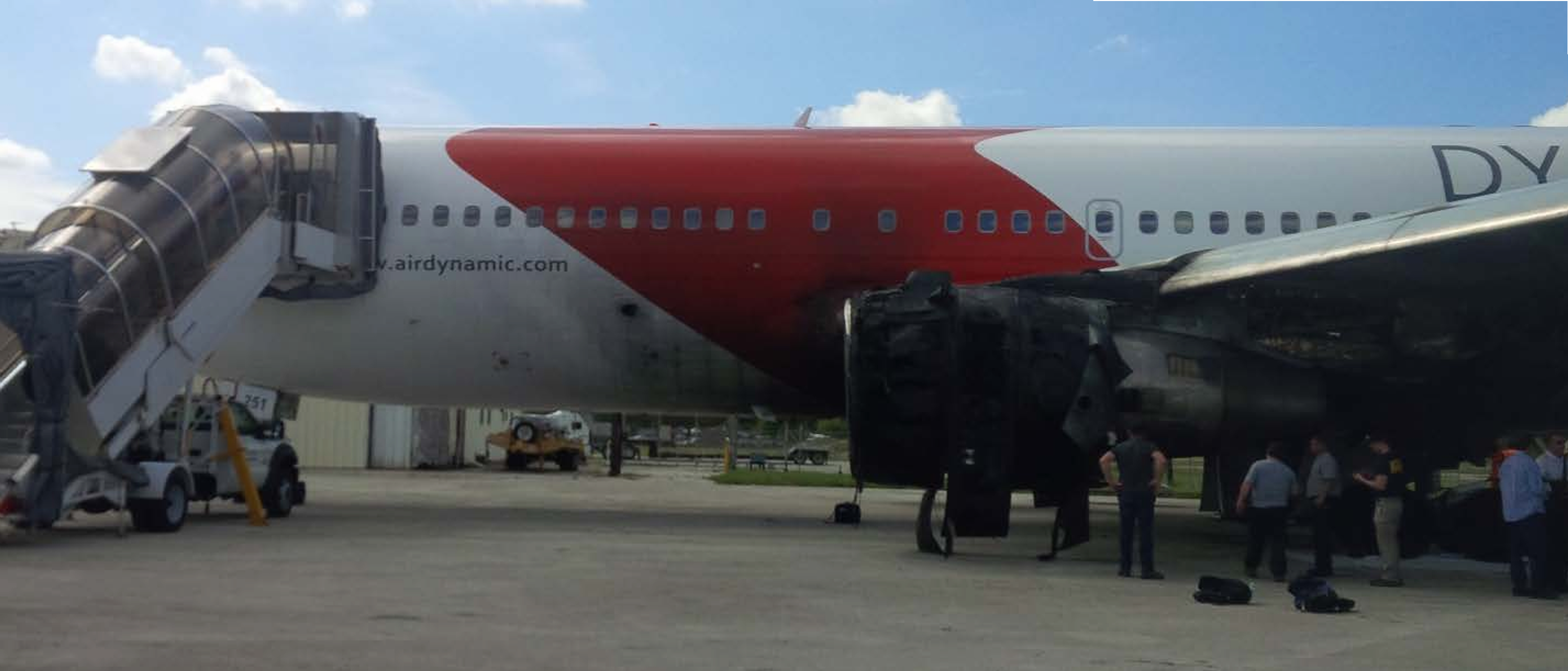
Dynamic International Airways Flight 405 after the fire

- January 13, 1923 – an Aeromarine West Indies Airways Aeromarine 75 ditched into the Straits of Florida after suffering engine troubles, killing 4 of the 9 occupants.
- October 5, 1945 – National Airlines Flight 16, a Lockheed Lodestar, crashed into the water after overshooting the runway in Lakeland, Florida. Two passengers drowned.
- December 28, 1948 – a Douglas DC-3 operated by Airborne Transport disappeared near the end of a scheduled flight from San Juan, Puerto Rico, to Miami, Florida. The aircraft and its 32 occupants were never found, and the case remains unsolved.
- April 25, 1951 – Cubana de Aviación Flight 493, a Douglas DC-4 collided with a US Navy Beechcraft SNB-1 Kansan over Key West, killing all 43 on both aircraft.
- February 12, 1963 – Northwest Orient Airlines Flight 705, a Boeing 720, lost control, broke up in midair, and crashed into the Everglades shortly after taking off from Miami in a severe thunderstorm. All 43 people on board were killed.
- June 23, 1969 – Dominicana de Aviación Flight 401, an Aviation Traders Carvair, crashed in Miami after suffering multiple engine failures. All 4 crew members and 6 on the ground were killed.
- December 29, 1972 – Eastern Air Lines Flight 401, a Lockheed L-1011, crashed into the Everglades while attempting to land in Miami. 101 of the 176 people on board were killed.
- May 8, 1978 – National Airlines Flight 193, a Boeing 727, crashed into Escambia Bay while on approach to Pensacola, sinking in 12 feet (3.7 m) of water. Three passengers drowned while attempting to exit the aircraft.
- May 5, 1983 – Eastern Air Lines Flight 855, a Lockheed L-1011, lost all three engines in-flight above Miami. The pilots managed to land safely at Miami International Airport after successfully restarting one engine.
- December 6, 1984 – Provincetown-Boston Airlines Flight 1039, an Embraer EMB 110, crashed upon takeoff from Jacksonville International Airport, killing all 13 passengers and crew.
- May 11, 1996 – ValuJet Flight 592, a DC-9, crashed in the Florida Everglades after a fire started in a cargo hold during takeoff. All 110 on board were killed.
- July 6, 1996 – Delta Air Lines Flight 1288, an MD-88, experienced an uncontained engine failure during takeoff roll at Pensacola Airport. Debris from the front compressor hub of the engine penetrated the fuselage, killing two passengers.
- August 7, 1997 – Fine Air Flight 101, a Douglas DC-8, stalled and crashed on takeoff from Miami International Airport due to uneven weight distribution. All 4 crew members and one person on the ground were killed.
- December 19, 2005 – Chalk's Ocean Airways Flight 101, a Grumman Mallard, crashed off Miami Beach, Florida, due to structural failure of both wings, killing all 20 on board.
- October 29, 2015 – Dynamic International Airways Flight 405, a Boeing 767, suffered a fire while taxiing at Fort Lauderdale–Hollywood International Airport due to a fuel leak. The 101 occupants were evacuated safely.
- October 28, 2016 – FedEx Express Flight 910, an MD-10, suffered a landing gear collapse on landing at Fort Lauderdale–Hollywood International Airport. Neither pilot was killed.
- May 3, 2019 – Miami Air International Flight 293, a Boeing 737-800, overran the runway at Naval Air Station Jacksonville, coming to rest in the St. Johns River. 21 people were injured.
- June 21, 2022 – RED Air Flight 203, an MD-82, suffered a landing gear collapse and runway excursion at Miami International Airport. Three minor injuries occurred among the 140 passengers and crew on board.
- September 6, 2026 – 21 Air Flight 7598, a Boeing 767-300F operated for Amazon Air, overran the runway at Miami International Airport, collided with vehicles and caught fire. The two pilots escaped with injuries, but 5 people on the ground were killed.
- November 2, 2026 - Austin–Bergstrom International Airport, a privately owned Learjet 60 business jet crashed in Palm Beach County, it crashed after a high-speed descent, killing all nine people on board and injuring a person on the ground.

== Georgia ==
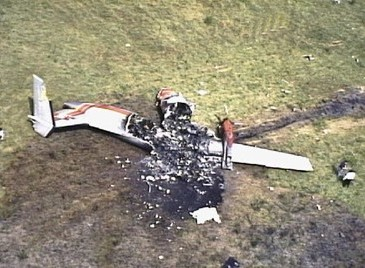
Atlantic Southeast Airlines Flight 529

- February 26, 1941 – Eastern Air Lines Flight 21, a DC-3, crashed while preparing to land at Candler Field. 8 of the 16 on board were killed. Among the injured was Eastern Air Lines president and World War I hero Eddie Rickenbacker.
- April 22, 1947 – the Columbus mid-air collision occurred when a Delta Air Lines DC-3 collided in mid-air with a Vultee BT-13 above Muscogee County Airport, killing all 9 people on board both aircraft.
- April 4, 1977 – Southern Airways Flight 242, a Douglas DC-9, executed a forced landing on a highway in New Hope, Paulding County, Georgia, after suffering hail damage and losing thrust on both engines in a severe thunderstorm. 63 of 85 passengers and crew on board were killed, as were 9 more on the ground.
- April 5, 1991 – Atlantic Southeast Airlines Flight 2311, an Embraer 120, lost control and crashed near Brunswick, Georgia, killing all 23 passengers and crew, including former U.S. Senator John Tower and astronaut Sonny Carter.
- August 21, 1995 – Atlantic Southeast Airlines Flight 529, an Embraer 120, crashed near Carrollton, Georgia, on August 21, 1995, due to mechanical failure, and the wreckage subsequently ignited before an evacuation could be completed. Nine of the 29 passengers and crew on board eventually died due to injuries suffered in the accident.

== Hawaii ==
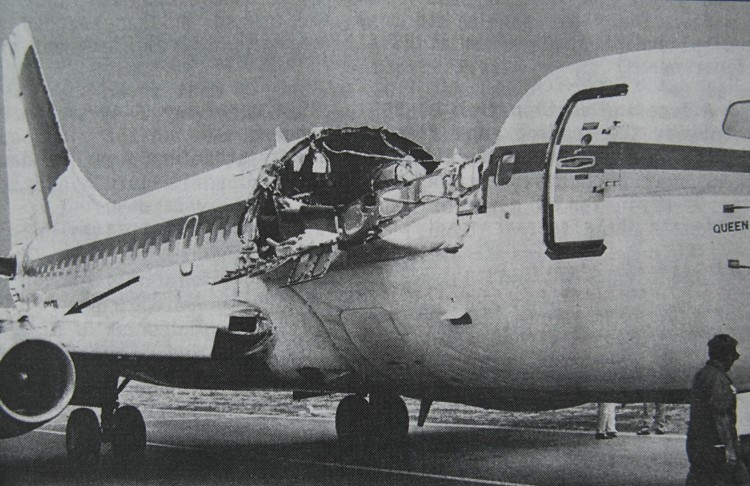
The damage to Aloha Airlines Flight 243

- October 16, 1956 – Pan Am Flight 6, a Boeing 377, was forced to make an emergency water landing in the Pacific Ocean northeast of Hawaii after two of its four engines failed. Only a few minor injuries and no fatalities were reported.
- July 22, 1962 – Canadian Pacific Air Lines Flight 301, a Bristol Britannia, crashed at Honolulu International Airport during an attempted go-around, killing 27 of the 40 on board.
- August 11, 1982 – Pan Am Flight 830, a Boeing 747, made an emergency landing in Honolulu after a terrorist bomb exploded, killing a single passenger.
- April 28, 1988 – Aloha Airlines Flight 243, a Boeing 737, suffered explosive decompression when a large section of the fuselage blew off. A flight attendant was ejected from the aircraft and killed, and the plane made an emergency landing at Kahului Airport.
- February 24, 1989 – United Airlines Flight 811, a Boeing 747, experienced a cargo door failure in flight above the Pacific Ocean on February 24, 1989, after its stopover at Honolulu International Airport, Hawaii. The resulting explosive decompression blew out several rows of seats, killing 9 passengers. The aircraft made an emergency landing at Honolulu.
- October 28, 1989 – Aloha IslandAir Flight 1712, a Twin Otter, crashed on Molokaʻi, killing all 20 on board.
- February 13, 2018 – United Airlines Flight 1175, a Boeing 777, made an emergency landing at Honolulu International Airport after suffering an uncontained engine failure.
- July 2, 2021 – Transair Flight 810, a Boeing 737, ditched off the coast of Oahu after a double engine failure. Both crew survive with injuries.

== Illinois ==
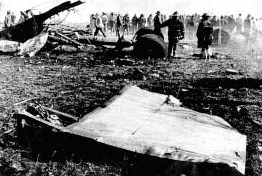
Crash site of American Airlines Flight 191

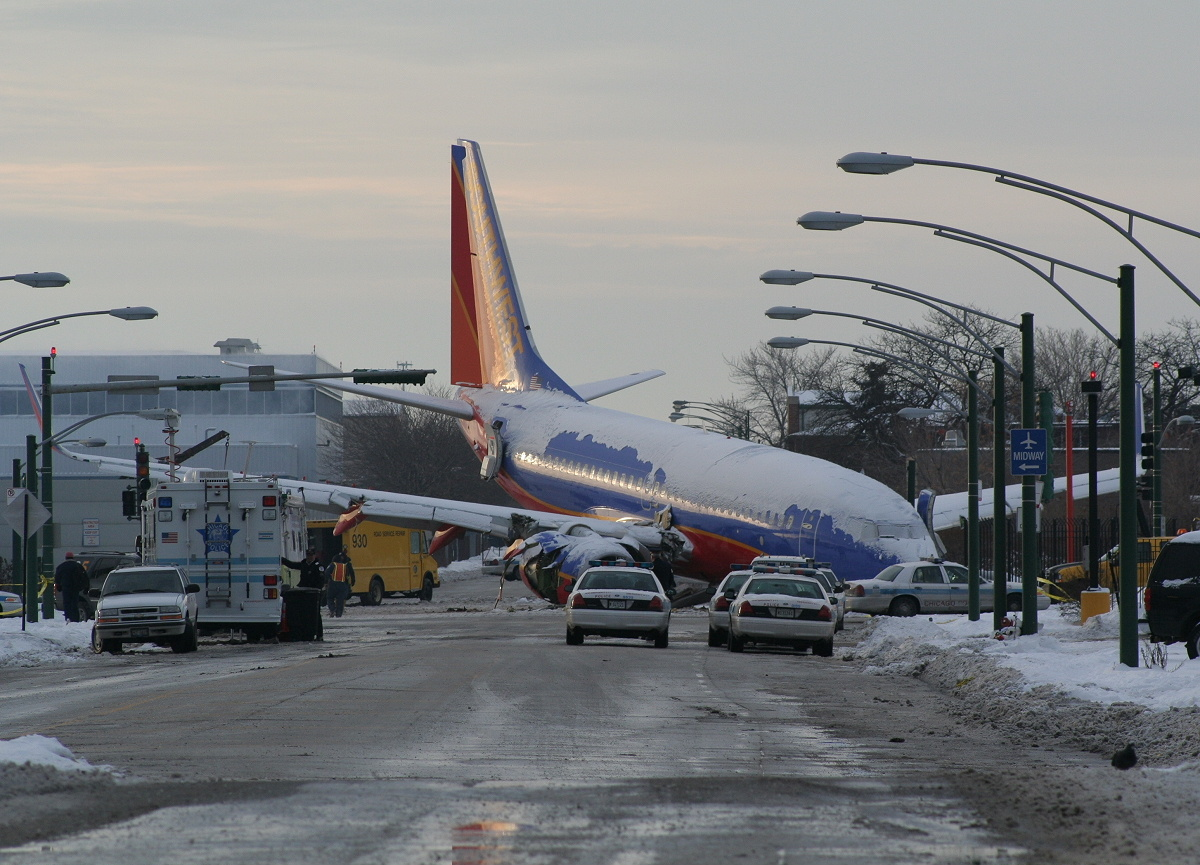
Southwest Airlines Flight 1248

- March 10, 1948 – Delta Air Lines Flight 705, a DC-4, stalled and crashed on takeoff from Chicago Municipal Airport after losing pitch control. 12 people were killed, leaving 1 survivor.
- July 27, 1960 – Chicago Helicopter Airways Flight 698, a Sikorsky S-58, crashed into Forest Home Cemetery after suffering a rotor failure, killing all 13 on board.
- September 1, 1961 – TWA Flight 529, a Lockheed L-049, crashed on takeoff from Chicago Midway International Airport, killing all 78 people on board. A bolt had fallen out of the elevator system, resulting in an abrupt pitch up and stall.
- September 17, 1961 – Northwest Orient Airlines Flight 706, a Lockheed L-188 Electra, crashed during take-off from O'Hare International Airport, killing all 37 on board. The co-pilot's control of the aileron boost unit had been disconnected during maintenance.
- August 16, 1965 – United Airlines Flight 389 crashed into Lake Michigan near Lake Forest, Illinois, killing all 30 on board. The NTSB could not determine a definitive cause for the pilot's actions, though it was most likely the result of the pilots misreading their three-pointer altimeters by 10,000 feet (3,000 m).
- December 27, 1968 – North Central Airlines Flight 458, a Convair CV-580, crashed into a hangar at O'Hare International Airport while attempting to land at night, killing 27 people on board and 1 on the ground.
- June 11, 1971 – TWA Flight 358, a Boeing 727, was hijacked on the ground at O'Hare International Airport, with the hijacker demanding the aircraft be flown to North Vietnam. Passengers were allowed to leave the aircraft, during which one was murdered. The pilots flew the aircraft to JFK Airport, where the hijacker was arrested.
- December 8, 1972 – United Airlines Flight 553, a Boeing 737, struck trees and houses in Chicago before crashing into a house after an aborted landing at Chicago Midway Airport. Illinois Congressman George W. Collins and the wife of Watergate conspirator E. Howard Hunt, Dorothy Hunt, were killed in the crash.
- December 20, 1972 – the Chicago–O'Hare runway collision occurred when North Central Airlines Flight 575, a DC-9, collided with Delta Air Lines Flight 954, a Convair 880, at O'Hare Airport. The Delta flight had attempted to cross the runway that the North Central aircraft was departing from. The DC-9 struck the Convair after briefly becoming airborne, and crash-landed back on the runway. 10 people were killed on board the DC-9, and all occupants of the Convair were evacuated safely.
- December 21, 1978 – TWA Flight 541, a DC-9, was hijacked and flown to Williamson County Regional Airport, with no casualties.
- May 25, 1979 – American Airlines Flight 191, a Douglas DC-10, lost control and crashed immediately after take-off at O'Hare International Airport, Chicago, killing all 271 occupants and two people on the ground. Its number-one engine had been severed on the runway. It is the deadliest aviation accident to occur in the United States.
- October 11, 1983 – Air Illinois Flight 710, a Hawker Siddeley HS 748, crashed near Pinckneyville after the pilots mismanaged an electrical failure. All 10 passengers and crew on board were killed.
- December 8, 2005 – Southwest Airlines Flight 1248, a Boeing 737-700, overran the runway while landing in a snowstorm at Chicago Midway Airport. The aircraft crashed into automobile traffic, killing a 6-year-old boy in a car.
- October 28, 2016 – American Airlines Flight 383, a Boeing 767, suffered an uncontained engine failure resulting in a fire on takeoff roll at O'Hare International Airport. The takeoff was aborted and the aircraft was evacuated without fatalities.

== Indiana ==
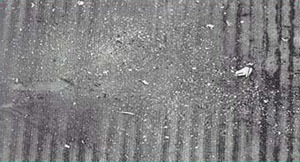
The crash site of American Eagle Flight 4184

- October 10, 1933 – United Air Lines Flight 23, a Boeing 247, was destroyed by a bomb near Chesterton, Indiana, in what is thought to be the first proven act of air sabotage in the history of commercial aviation. All 7 on board were killed.
- December 28, 1946 – American Airlines Flight 2207, a Douglas C-50, crashed near Michigan City after suffering fuel exhaustion. 2 of the 21 people on board were killed.
- March 17, 1960 – Northwest Orient Airlines Flight 710, a Lockheed L-188 Electra, broke up in mid-air and crashed near Cannelton, Indiana, killing all 57 passengers and 6 crew members.
- September 9, 1969 – Allegheny Airlines Flight 853, a DC-9, collided in mid-air with a Piper Cherokee southeast of Indianapolis, killing all 83 people aboard both aircraft.
- December 13, 1977 – Air Indiana Flight 216, a DC-3, crashed at Evansville Regional Airport killing all 29 on board. The flight was carrying the University of Evansville men's basketball team.
- October 31, 1994 – American Eagle Flight 4184, an ATR 72 operated by Simmons Airlines, crashed near Roselawn due to icing, killing all 68 on board.

== Iowa ==
- July 19, 1989 – United Airlines Flight 232, a McDonnell Douglas DC-10, at Sioux Gateway Airport in Sioux City after explosion of the number-two engine destroyed all three hydraulic systems. The pilots attempted to land the aircraft with only the throttle control. 112 of the 296 people on board were killed.

== Kansas ==
- March 31, 1931 – a Transcontinental and Western Air Fokker F-10 suffered a structural failure and crashed near Bazaar, Kansas, killing all eight aboard, including University of Notre Dame football coach Knute Rockne.

== Kentucky ==
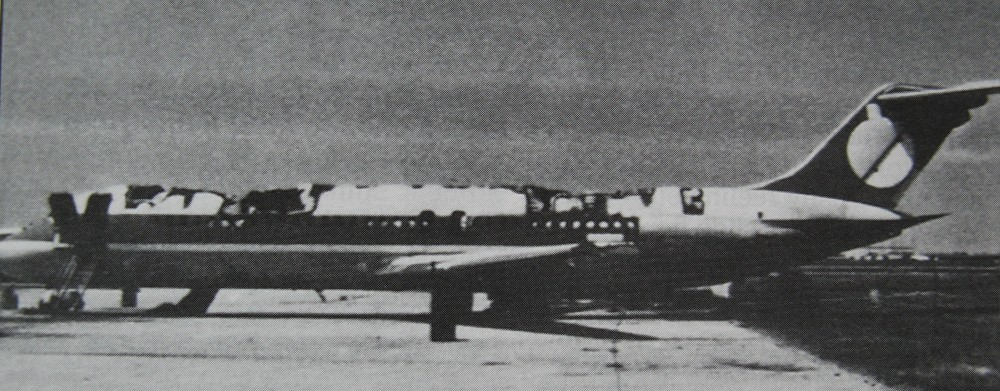
Air Canada Flight 797 after the fire

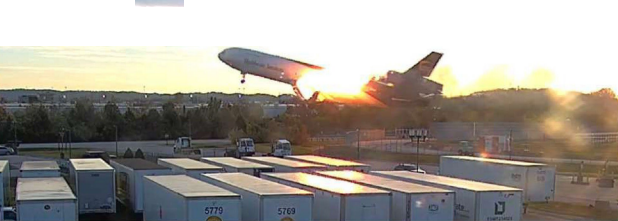
UPS Airlines Flight 2976 mid-crash

- July 28, 1943 – American Airlines Flight 63, a DC-3, lost control due to severe turbulence and violent downdrafts and crashed near Trammel, Kentucky, killing 20 of the 22 people on board.
- September 28, 1953 – Resort Airlines Flight 1081, a Curtiss C-46, crashed on landing at Louisville-Standiford Field after suffering a structural failure, killing 25.
- January 12, 1955 – The Cincinnati mid-air collision occurred between TWA Flight 694, a Martin 2-0-2, and a Douglas DC-3, killing all 15 people on board across both aircraft.
- November 8, 1965 – American Airlines Flight 383, a Boeing 727, crashed on approach to Cincinnati/Northern Kentucky International Airport, killing 58 of the 62 people on board.
- November 6, 1967 – TWA Flight 159, a Boeing 707, veered off the runway after the captain aborted a takeoff at Cincinnati/Northern Kentucky International Airport. The aircraft crashed and caught fire. One passenger later died of injuries sustained during the crash.
- November 20, 1967 – TWA Flight 128, a Convair 880, struck trees on final approach and crashed 9,357 feet (2,852 m) short of the runway at Cincinnati/Northern Kentucky International Airport, killing 70 of the 82 people on board.
- October 8, 1979 – Comair Flight 444, a Piper PA-31, crashed shortly after takeoff from Cincinnati/Northern Kentucky International Airport, killing all 8 people on board.
- June 2, 1983 – Air Canada Flight 797, a DC-9, made an emergency landing at Cincinnati/Northern Kentucky International Airport, after a fire started in the aft washroom. By the time the plane landed, the fire had already consumed much of the aircraft. While the evacuation was in progress, the fire erupted in a flashover, which killed 23 of the 46 people on board.
- August 13, 2004 – Air Tahoma Flight 185, a Convair 580, ran out of fuel and crashed as it approached the runway at Cincinnati/Northern Kentucky International Airport. One person, the first officer, was killed.
- August 27, 2006 – Comair Flight 5191, a Bombardier CRJ100 operating for Delta Connection, overran the runway and crashed while attempting to take off from the wrong runway at Blue Grass Airport, killing all 47 passengers and 2 of the 3 crew members. The first officer was the only survivor.
- November 4, 2025 – UPS Airlines Flight 2976, a McDonnell Douglas MD-11, suffered an engine fire and separation of the #1 engine shortly after takeoff from the Louisville Muhammad Ali International Airport. The aircraft lost control and crashed into an industrial area, killing all 3 crew members on board and 12 people on the ground.

== Louisiana ==
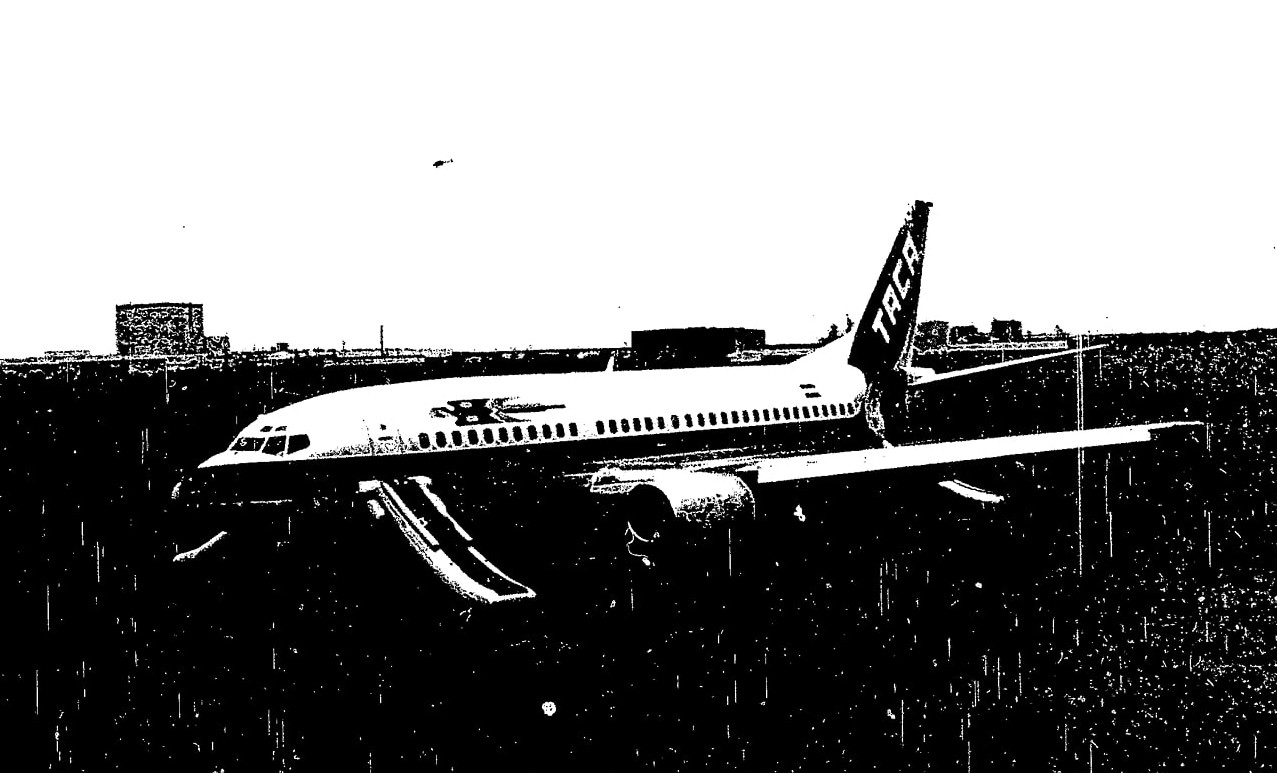
TACA Flight 110 after landing

- November 16, 1959 – National Airlines Flight 967, a Douglas DC-7, disappeared over the Gulf of Mexico near New Orleans with 42 passengers and crew on board. Several bodies and some scattered debris were recovered, though the main section of wreckage was never found. The cause was presumed to be a bombing, though investigators were unable to prove it.
- February 25, 1964 – Eastern Air Lines Flight 304, a Douglas DC-8, crashed into Lake Pontchartrain, killing all 58 on board.
- March 30, 1967 – Delta Air Lines Flight 9877, a Douglas DC-8, crashed in New Orleans during a training flight, killing all six crew on board and 13 people on the ground.
- July 9, 1982 – Pan Am Flight 759, a Boeing 727, crashed shortly after takeoff from Louis Armstrong New Orleans International Airport after encountering a microburst. All 145 people on board were killed, as well as 8 on the ground.
- May 24, 1988 – TACA Flight 110, a Boeing 737-300, made a successful deadstick landing on a grass levee at NASA's Michoud Assembly Facility in eastern New Orleans after losing thrust in both engines. No casualties or serious injuries occurred.

== Maine ==
- June 20, 1944 – TWA Flight 277, a Douglas C-54, crashed into Fort Mountain in Baxter State Park. Heavy wind with rain had blown the aircraft off course, and the pilot suffered spatial disorientation and did not realize his position in relation to the mountain. The pilot and all six passengers were killed.
- May 30, 1979 – Downeast Airlines Flight 46, a Twin Otter, crashed during approach to Knox County Regional Airport, killing both crew and 15 of the 16 passengers on board.
- August 25, 1985 – Bar Harbor Airlines Flight 1808, a Beech 99, crashed short of the runway at Lewiston Airport killing all 8 on board, including 13-year-old Samantha Smith, the "Goodwill Ambassador" to the Soviet Union.
- March 4, 2019 – CommutAir Flight 4933, an Embraer ERJ-145 operating for United Express, crash-landed on the grass to the right of the runway at Presque Isle International Airport. No fatalities occurred.

== Maryland ==
- May 30, 1947 – Eastern Air Lines Flight 605, a Douglas C-54, lost control and crashed east of Bainbridge, killing all 53 on board.
- May 12, 1959 – Capital Airlines Flight 75, a Vickers Viscount, crashed in Chase, Maryland due to a weather-induced loss of control. All 31 on board were killed.
- November 23, 1962 – United Airlines Flight 297, a Vickers Viscount, crashed near Columbia, Maryland after a bird strike, killing all 17 on board.
- December 8, 1963 – Pan Am Flight 214, a Boeing 707, crashed near Elkton, Maryland, after a lightning strike caused flammable fumes in an empty fuel tank to explode. All 81 people on board were killed.

== Massachusetts ==
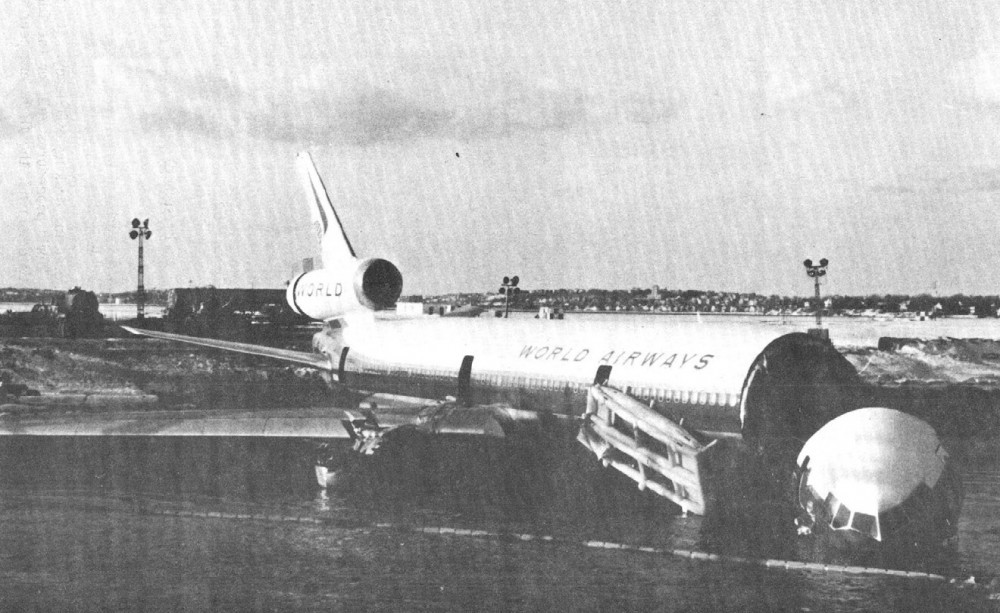
World Airways Flight 30

- September 15, 1957 – Northeast Airlines Flight 285, a DC-3, crashed on approach to New Bedford Regional Airport, killing 12 of the 24 people on board.
- August 15, 1958 – Northeast Airlines Flight 258, a Convair CV-240, crashed near Nantucket Memorial Airport, killing 25 of the 34 people on board.
- October 4, 1960 – Eastern Air Lines Flight 375, a Lockheed L-188, crashed into the bay after takeoff from Logan International Airport. Only 10 of the 72 people on board survived.
- March 17, 1970 – Eastern Air Lines Shuttle Flight 1320, a DC-9, was hijacked en route to Boston. The first officer was shot and killed, but despite injuries, the captain landed the aircraft at Logan International Airport.
- July 31, 1973 – Delta Air Lines Flight 723, a Douglas DC-9, crashed while landing at Boston Logan International Airport, killing all 89 on board.
- December 17, 1973 – Iberia Flight 933, a Douglas DC-10, crashed short of the runway at Boston Logan International Airport. 13 people were injured.
- June 17, 1979 – Air New England Flight 248, a Twin Otter, crashed on approach to Barnstable Municipal Airport, killing one crew member.
- January 23, 1982 – World Airways Flight 30, a Douglas DC-10, overshot the runway at Logan International Airport in icy conditions, killing two passengers.
- August 26, 2003 – Colgan Air Flight 9446, a Beech 1900 on a repositioning flight for US Airways Express, crashed into the water off of Yarmouth, Massachusetts, shortly after takeoff. Improper maintenance and pilot error led to a loss of control in-flight. Both pilots died.

== Michigan ==
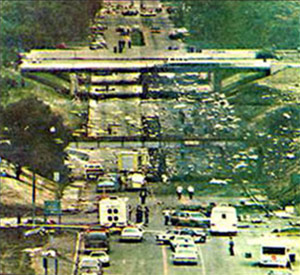
Debris from Northwest Airlines Flight 255 scattered across Middlebelt Road after crashing on August 16, 1987.

- June 23, 1950 – Northwest Orient Airlines Flight 2501, a Douglas DC-4, disappeared in the night over Benton Harbor on Lake Michigan. The plane and its 58 occupants was never found.
- July 9, 1956 – Trans-Canada Air Lines Flight 304, a Vickers Viscount, diverted to Windsor, Ontario, after the blade of the propeller broke off and sliced through a section of the cabin, killing one passenger and injuring 5 others while flying over Flat Rock, Michigan.
- April 6, 1958 – Capital Airlines Flight 67, a Vickers Viscount, crashed on final approach to MBS Airport during a severe snowstorm, killing all 47 people on board.
- April 4, 1979 – TWA Flight 841, a Boeing 727, made an emergency landing at Detroit after losing control and barrel-rolling at supersonic speeds. No fatalities occurred among the 82 passengers and seven crew members, though eight passengers reported minor injuries relating to high G forces. The exact cause of the accident is disputed.
- January 11, 1983 – United Airlines Flight 2885, a Douglas DC-8, crashed on takeoff from Detroit Metropolitan Airport, killing all 3 crew members on board.
- March 4, 1987 – Northwest Airlink Flight 2268, a CASA C-212 Aviocar operated by Fischer Brothers Aviation, crashed while attempting to land at Detroit Metropolitan Airport, killing 10 of the 20 people on board.
- August 16, 1987 – Northwest Airlines Flight 255, an MD-82, crashed after takeoff from Detroit Metropolitan Airport, because the pilots had failed to set the flaps to takeoff position. 154 people on board, plus two on the ground, were killed. The only surviving passenger was a four-year-old girl.
- December 3, 1990 – the 1990 Wayne County Airport runway collision occurred when Northwest Airlines Flight 299, a Boeing 727, collided with Northwest Airlines Flight 1482, a DC-9, on an active runway at Detroit Metropolitan Wayne County Airport in heavy fog. Seven passengers and one crew member from Flight 1482 were killed. Flight 299 successfully aborted takeoff with no injuries.
- January 9, 1997 – Comair Flight 3272, an Embraer 120 operating for Delta Connection, lost control crashed on approach to Detroit Metropolitan Wayne County Airport in icing conditions, killing all 29 people on board.
- December 25, 2009 – Northwest Airlines Flight 253, an Airbus A330, was the target of the attempted al-Qaida "Christmas Day bombing". Umar Farouk Abdulmutallab attempted to detonate plastic explosives concealed in his underwear, but was stopped by other passengers.
- March 8, 2017 – Ameristar Charters Flight 9363, a McDonnell Douglas MD-83, overran the runway at Willow Run Airport, Ypsilanti, due to a jammed elevator. The occupants were evacuated safely.

== Minnesota ==
- March 7, 1950 – Northwest Orient Airlines Flight 307, a Martin 2-0-2, hit a flagpole on approach to Minneapolis-Saint Paul International Airport and crashed into a house. All 13 on board and 2 on the ground were killed.
- December 1, 1993 – Northwest Airlink Flight 5719, a BAe Jetstream 31 operated by Express Airlines II, crashed on approach to Hibbing following a controlled excessive descent into the airport on its night approach during ILS conditions. All 18 people on board were killed.
- October 21, 2009 – Northwest Airlines Flight 188, an Airbus A320, overflew its destination by over 150 miles and was unreachable by air traffic control for approximately 75 minutes. The pilots admitted that they had been using their personal laptops but denied suggestions of falling asleep. No one was harmed.

== Mississippi ==
- October 20, 1977 – a Convair CV-240 that was carrying members of the rock band Lynyrd Skynyrd crashed in Gillsburg, Mississippi, after running out of fuel. The crash claimed the lives of six of the 20 people on board the aircraft, including four passengers and both crew members.

== Missouri ==
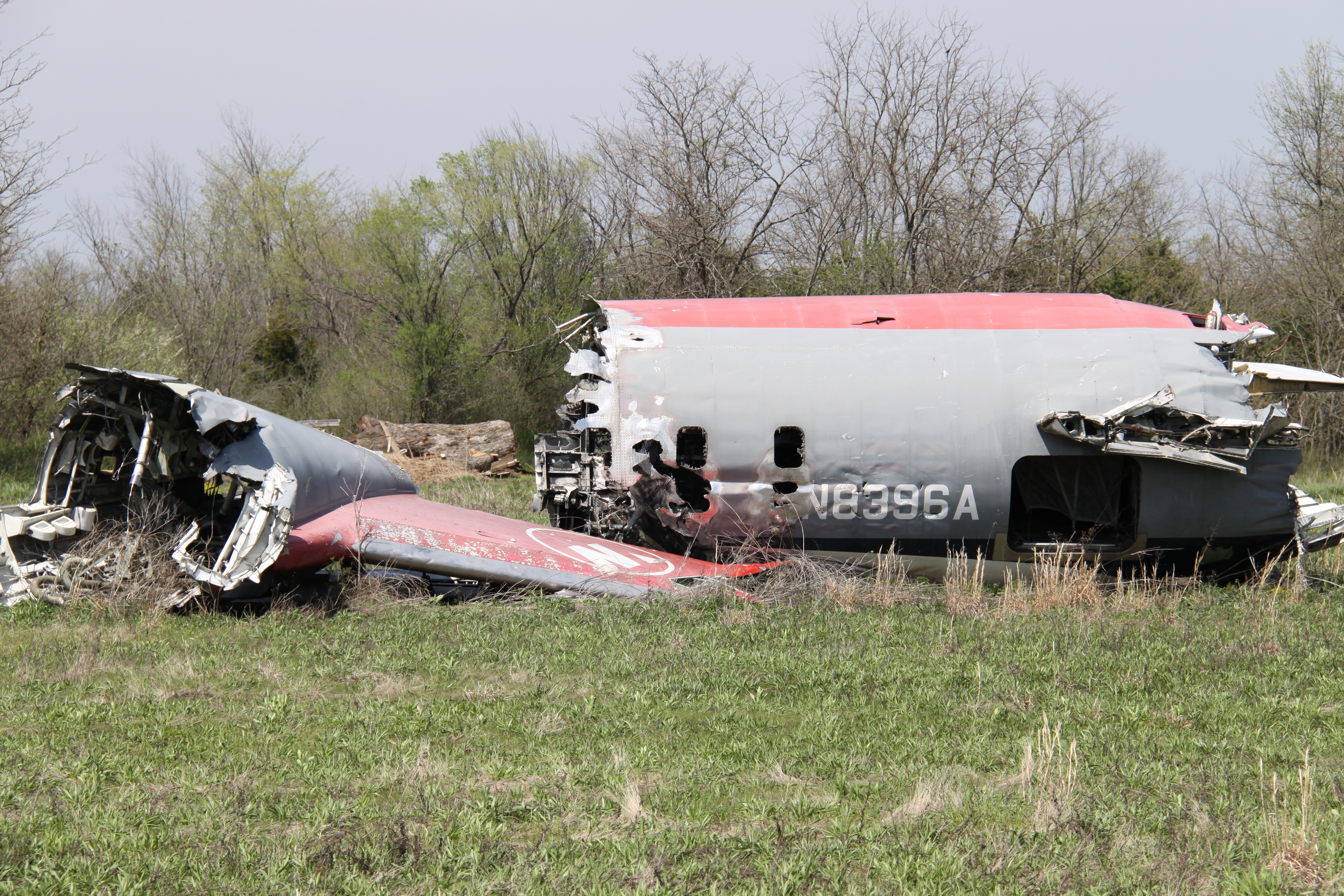
Pinnacle Airlines Flight 3701

- May 6, 1935 – TWA Flight 6, a DC-2, crashed near Atlanta, killing 8 of the 16 people on board.
- August 5, 1936 – Chicago and Southern Air Lines Flight 4, a Lockheed Model 10, crashed in St. Louis, killing all 8 on board.
- March 20, 1955 – American Airlines Flight 711, a Convair CV-240, crashed on approach to Springfield Municipal Airport, killing 13.
- August 4, 1955 – American Airlines Flight 476, a Convair CV-240, suffered an in-flight fire and crashed attempting an emergency landing at Fort Leonard Wood. All 30 people on board were killed.
- May 22, 1962 – Continental Airlines Flight 11, a Boeing 707, crashed near Unionville, Missouri, after a bomb was detonated by a passenger. All 45 on board were killed.
- July 1, 1965 – Continental Airlines Flight 12, a Boeing 707, overran the runway at Kansas City Downtown Airport. 5 people were injured.
- March 27, 1968 – Ozark Air Lines Flight 965, a DC-9, suffered a mid-air collision with a Cessna 150 as both aircraft were approaching the same runway at Lambert Field. The Cessna was destroyed, killing both occupants, but the DC-9 landed safely.
- July 23, 1973 – Ozark Air Lines Flight 809, a Fairchild F-27, crashed on approach to Lambert-St. Louis International Airport after flying through a microburst generated by a severe thunderstorm. 38 of the 44 people on board were killed.
- November 22, 1994 – TWA Flight 427, a McDonnell Douglas MD-82, struck a Cessna 441 while on a takeoff roll at Lambert-St. Louis International Airport. The two people on board the Cessna were killed; no fatalities occurred on the TWA flight.
- February 16, 1995 – Air Transport International Flight 782, a DC-8 operating a ferry flight with one engine inoperative, overran the runway and crashed on takeoff from Kansas City International Airport, killing all 3 crew members.
- October 14, 2004 – Pinnacle Airlines Flight 3701, a Bombardier CRJ200 on a repositioning flight for Northwest Airlink, crashed near Jefferson City, Missouri, after dual engine flameout and subsequent pilot error, after the pilots had intentionally pushed the limits of the aircraft.
- October 19, 2004 – Corporate Airlines Flight 5966, a BAe Jetstream 32, crashed on approach to Kirksville Airport, killing 13.

== Montana ==
- January 10, 1938 – Northwest Airlines Flight 2, a Lockheed 14 Super Electra, crashed into the Bridger Mountains about 12 miles (19 km) northeast of Bozeman. All 10 people on board were killed.
- January 13, 1939 – Northwest Airlines Flight 1, a Lockheed 14, crashed 0.5 miles (0.80 km) southwest of Miles City after a fire broke out in the cockpit. The 4 people on board were killed.

== Nebraska ==
- August 6, 1966 – Braniff International Airways Flight 250, a BAC One-Eleven broke up midair and crashed near Falls City, Nebraska after flying into an active squall line. All 42 on board were killed.

== Nevada ==
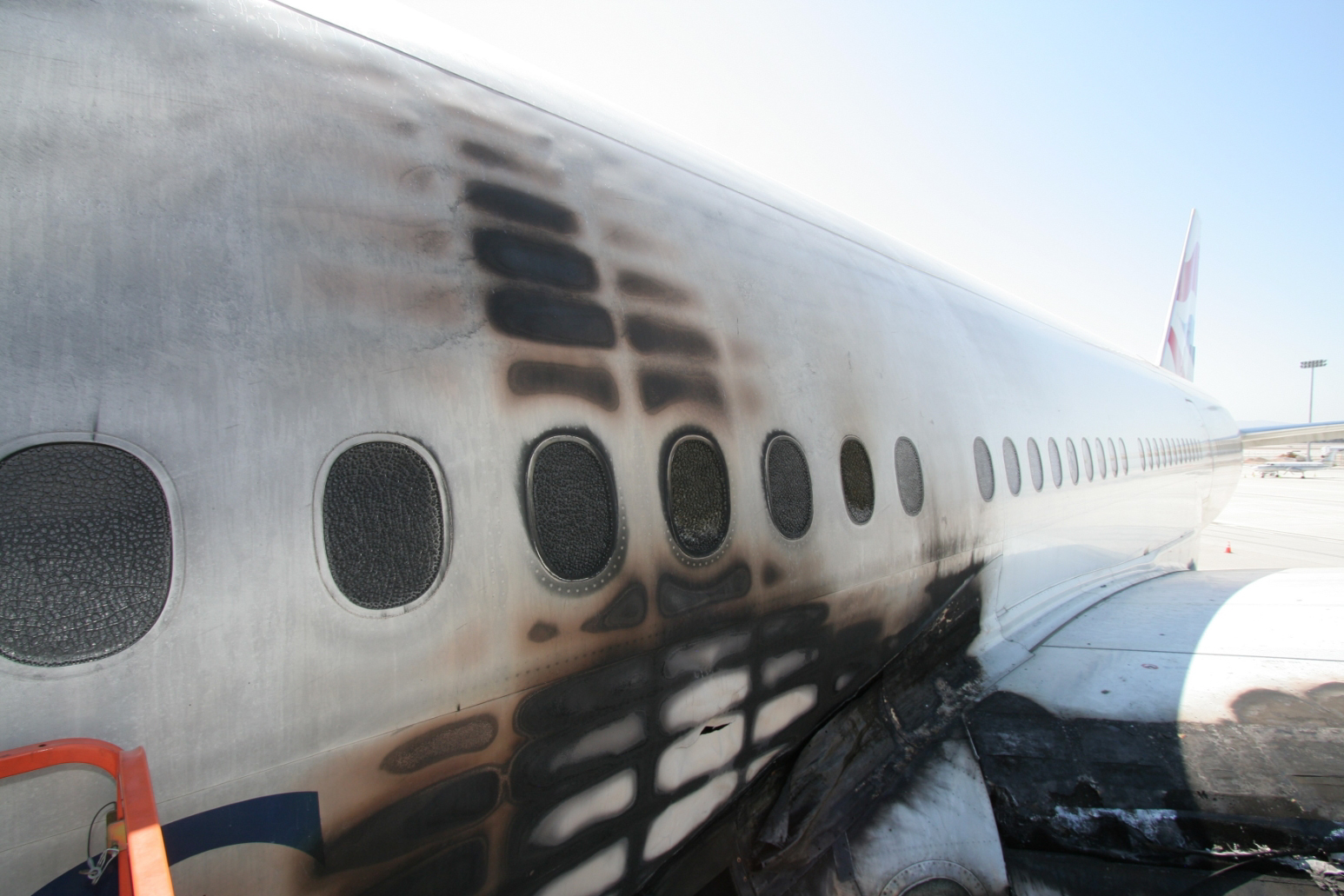
Damage to British Airways Flight 2276

- January 16, 1942 – TWA Flight 3, a Douglas DC-3, crashed into Mount Potosi 23 minutes after takeoff from Las Vegas. All 22 on board were killed, including movie star Carole Lombard.
- April 21, 1958 – United Air Lines Flight 736, a Douglas DC-7, collided with a US Air Force F-100 Super Sabre fighter on a training mission near Las Vegas. All 47 aboard the airliner and both F-100 crew members were killed.
- March 1, 1964 – Paradise Airlines Flight 901A, a Lockheed L-049 Constellation, crashed east of Lake Tahoe in a snowstorm, killing all 85 people on board.
- November 15, 1964 – Bonanza Air Lines Flight 114, a Fairchild F-27, crashed into a mountain about 8 miles (13 km) south of McCarran International Airport, killing all 29 on board.
- January 21, 1985 – Galaxy Airlines Flight 203, a Lockheed L-188 Electra, crashed near Reno-Cannon International Airport about 1.5 miles (2.4 km) from the end of the runway and burst into flames. Of the 71 passengers and crew, the only survivor was a 17-year-old passenger who was thrown clear of the plane.
- September 8, 2015 – British Airways Flight 2276, a Boeing 777, suffered an uncontained engine failure and fire on takeoff from Las Vegas McCarran Airport. The pilots aborted takeoff and all passengers were evacuated.

== New Hampshire ==
- November 30, 1954 – Northeast Airlines Flight 792, a DC-3, crashed into Mount Success, killing 2 of the 7 people on board.
- October 25, 1968 – Northeast Airlines Flight 946, a Fairchild F-27, crashed near Etna, New Hampshire, killing 32 passengers and crew. The NTSB determined that the plane was flying 600 feet (180 m) below its required altitude, though the reason for this is unknown. The NTSB report suggests that the pilots misjudged their altitude position during approach due to a lack of navigational aids on the aircraft and near the airport.

== New Jersey ==
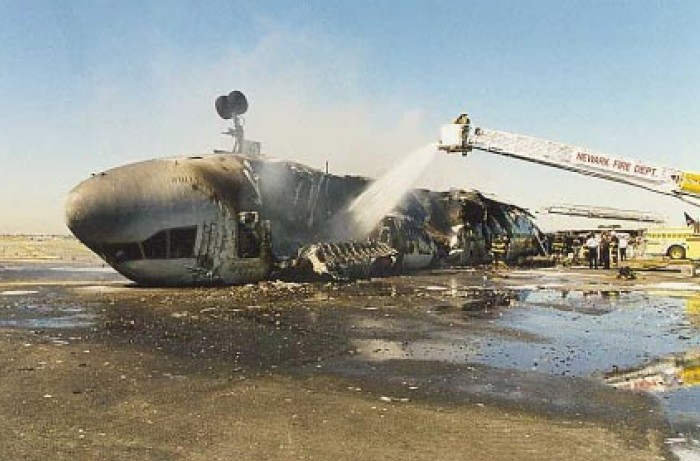
FedEx Flight 14

- December 16, 1951 – a Miami Airlines Curtiss C-46 crashed shortly after take-off from Newark Liberty International Airport, hitting a house next to the Elizabeth River. All 58 people on board were killed.
- January 22, 1952 – American Airlines Flight 6780, a Convair 240, crashed into a house in Elizabeth, New Jersey, 3.4 miles (5.5 km) southeast of the airport. All 23 on board and 7 on the ground were killed. The cause of the crash was never determined. This was the first fatal crash of a Convair 240.
- February 11, 1952 – National Airlines Flight 101, a Douglas DC-6, crashed shortly after take-off from Newark Airport. The aircraft impacted a residential building in Elizabeth, New Jersey, killing 29 people on board, as well as four on the ground.
- July 31, 1997 – FedEx Express Flight 14, a McDonnell Douglas MD-11, crashed during landing at Newark International Airport. The pilot was unable to slow down the descent of the aircraft, and it bounced and rolled on the runway, eventually coming to rest on its back and catching fire. All 5 occupants escaped the aircraft.
- October 28, 2006 – Continental Airlines Flight 1883, a Boeing 757, inadvertently landed on a taxiway instead of a runway at Newark Liberty International Airport. No one was harmed.

== New Mexico ==
- February 19, 1955 – TWA Flight 260, a Martin 4-0-4, deviated from its prescribed flight path and crashed into the Sandia Mountains, killing all 16 on board.
- November 27, 1971 – TWA Flight 106, a Boeing 727, was hijacked at Albuquerque International Sunport and flown to Havana, Cuba. No one was killed.
- November 3, 1973 – National Airlines Flight 27, a Douglas DC-10, suffered an uncontained engine failure above New Mexico, resulting in an explosive decompression. One passenger was ejected from the aircraft; the aircraft made an emergency landing at Albuquerque International Sunport.

== New York ==
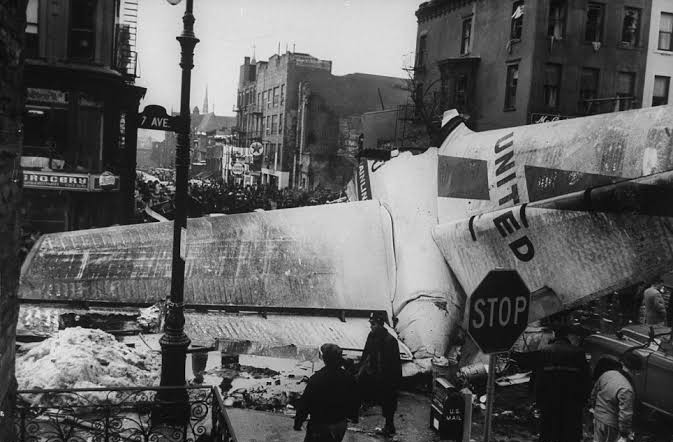
Tail section of United Airlines Flight 826 after the 1960 New York mid-air collision

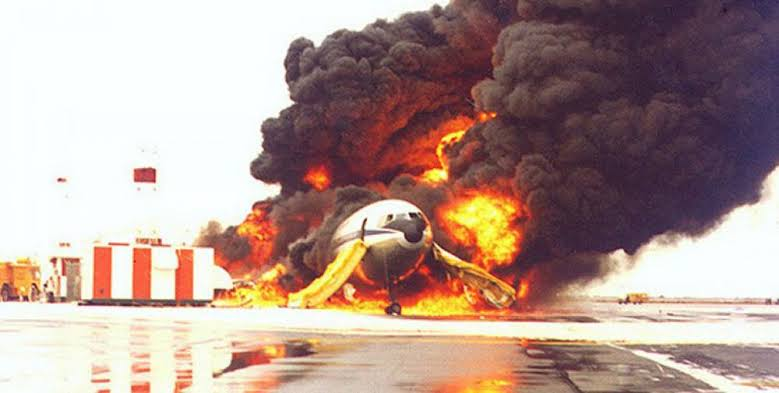
Overseas National Airways Flight 032 on fire at JFK

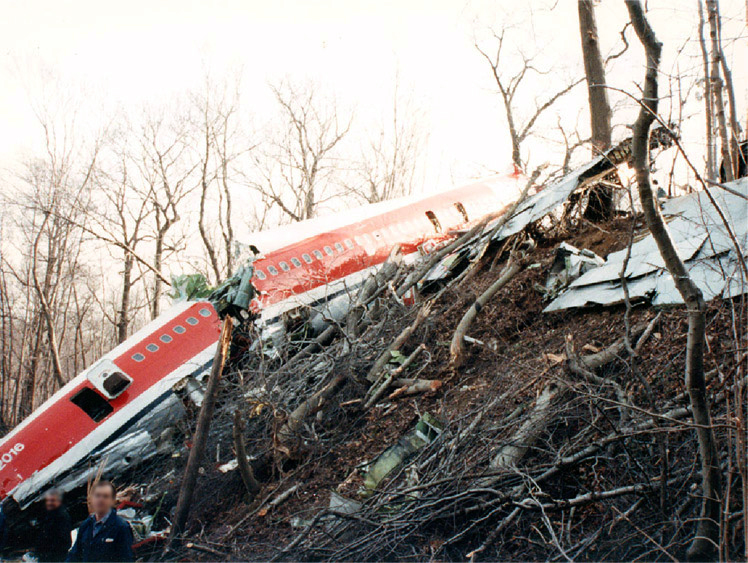
Wreckage of Avianca Flight 52

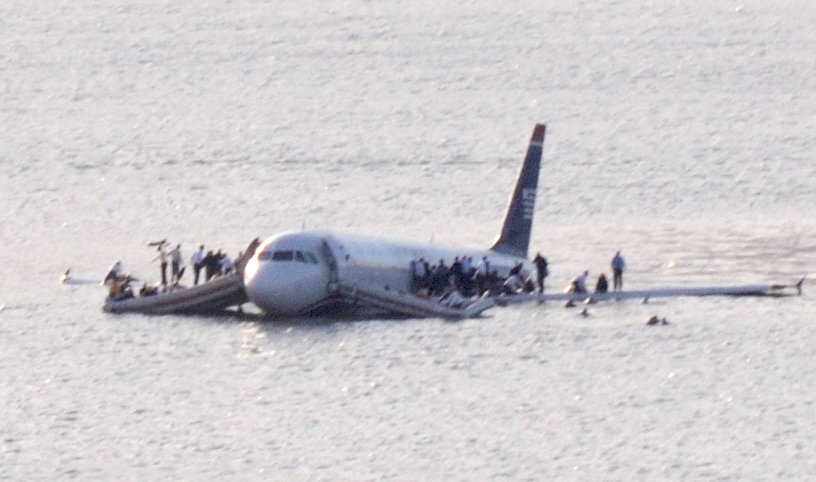
US Airways Flight 1549 after ditching into the Hudson River on January 15, 2009

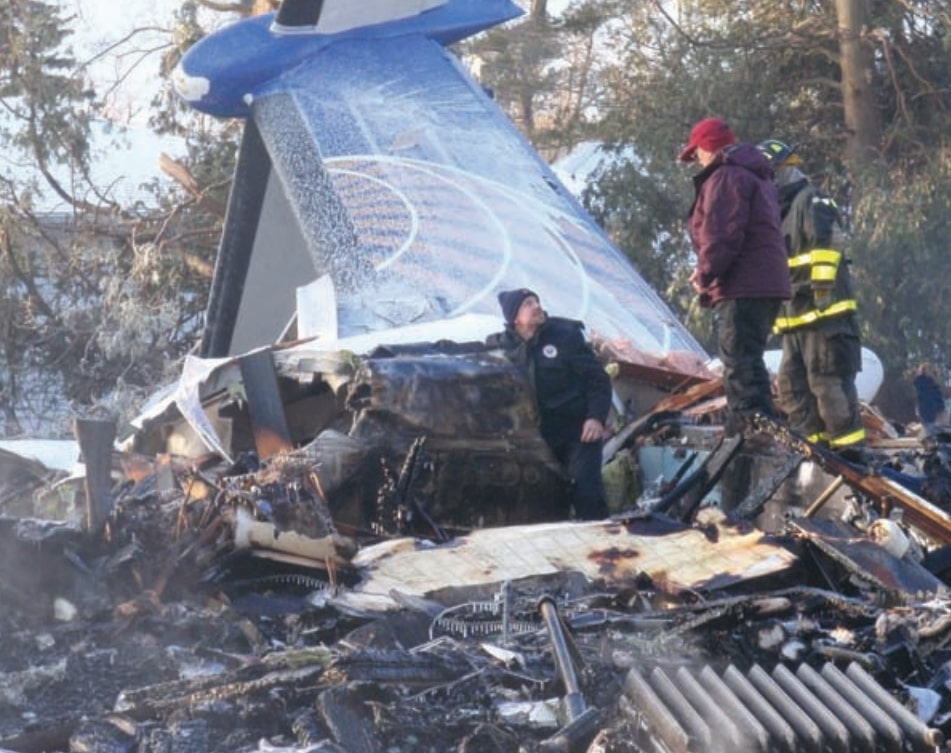
Tail section of Colgan Air Flight 3407

- May 29, 1947 – United Air Lines Flight 521, a Douglas DC-4, overran the runway on takeoff from LaGuardia Airport. The aircraft crossed the Grand Central Parkway, crashed into an embankment and plunged into a pond. 43 people were killed, leaving 5 survivors.
- January 30, 1949 – the Port Washington mid-air collision occurred when Pan Am Flight 100, a Lockheed L-749, collided with a Cessna 140 over Port Washington. Both occupants of the Cessna were killed; the Pan Am flight made an emergency landing at Mitchel Air Force Base.
- December 29, 1951 – Continental Charters Flight 44-2, a Curtiss C-46, crashed into a ridge near Napoli, New York, while en route to Buffalo. 26 people were killed.
- September 16, 1953 – American Airlines Flight 723, a Convair CV-240, crashed in Colonie, New York, while attempting to land at Albany Airport. All 28 people on board were killed.
- December 8, 1954 – Linee Aeree Italiane Flight 451, a DC-6, crashed on approach to Idlewild Airport, killing 26.
- April 4, 1955 – a United Air Lines DC-6 crashed shortly after takeoff from Long Island MacArthur Airport on a training flight, killing all 3 crew members.
- February 1, 1957 – Northeast Airlines Flight 823, a Douglas DC-6, crashed on Rikers Island after takeoff from LaGuardia Airport, killing 20 of the 101 people on board.
- February 3, 1959 – American Airlines Flight 320, a Lockheed L-188 Electra, crashed in the East River on approach to LaGuardia Airport, New York City. 65 of the 73 people on board were killed.
- August 15, 1959 – American Airlines Flight 514, a Boeing 707, lost control and crashed on a training flight in Calverton, killing all 5 crew members.
- December 16, 1960 – the New York mid-air collision occurred when TWA Flight 266, a Lockheed Super Constellation inbound to Idlewild Airport, and United Air Lines Flight 826, a DC-8 inbound to LaGuardia Airport, collided over Miller Field, Staten Island. The TWA aircraft crashed at the site, while the United aircraft continued flying for 8 miles until it crashed in the Park Slope section of Brooklyn. 134 fatalities occurred, including all on board both aircraft and 6 on the ground.
- January 28, 1961 – American Airlines Flight 1502, a Boeing 707, crashed at Montauk, after an unexplained loss of control while on a training flight. All 6 crew were killed.
- March 1, 1962 – American Airlines Flight 1, a Boeing 707, crashed immediately after takeoff from Idlewild Airport (now JFK Airport), New York City, killing all 95 people on board.
- November 30, 1962 – Eastern Air Lines Flight 512, a Douglas DC-7, crashed during go-round at Idlewild Airport. 25 people out of the 51 on board were killed.
- July 2, 1963 – Mohawk Airlines Flight 112, a Martin 4-0-4, crashed on takeoff from Rochester-Monroe Airport, killing 7 people and injuring 36.
- February 8, 1965 – Eastern Air Lines Flight 663, a Douglas DC-7, crashed into the Atlantic Ocean, about 7 miles south of Jones Beach State Park on Long Island, after takeoff from JFK Airport when forced to evade an inbound Pan Am Boeing 707. All 84 people on board were killed.
- December 4, 1965 - the Carmel mid-air collision occurred between TWA Flight 42, a Boeing 707, and Eastern Air Lines Flight 853, a Lockheed Super Constellation, over Carmel, New York. The TWA flight made an emergency landing at JFK Airport, and the Eastern flight made a forced landing, in which 4 people were killed.
- November 19, 1969 – Mohawk Airlines Flight 411, a Fairchild F-27, crashed into Pilot Knob, killing all 14 passengers and crew on board.
- September 8, 1970 – Trans International Airlines Flight 863, a DC-8 on a ferry flight, crashed on takeoff from JFK Airport, killing all 11 on board.
- March 3, 1972 – Mohawk Airlines Flight 405, a Fairchild F-27, crashed into a house on final approach to Albany International Airport, killing 17 people including 1 on the ground.
- December 1, 1974 – Northwest Orient Airlines Flight 6231, a Boeing 727, crashed near Stony Point while on its way to pick up passengers for a charter flight. All three crew on board were killed.
- June 24, 1975 – Eastern Air Lines Flight 66, a Boeing 727, crashed after encountering a microburst on approach to JFK Airport on June 24, 1975. 113 of the 124 people on board were killed.
- November 12, 1975 – Overseas National Airways Flight 032, a DC-10, rejected takeoff at JFK Airport after suffering a bird strike resulting in uncontained engine failure. The aircraft skidded off the runway and caught fire. All 139 people on board were evacuated.
- February 20, 1981 – Aerolíneas Argentinas Flight 342, a Boeing 707, nearly collided with the North Tower of the World Trade Center after the pilots misinterpreted a descent instruction. The air traffic controller intervened, averting collision by approximately 90 seconds.
- September 20, 1989 – USAir Flight 5050, a Boeing 737-400, overran the runway and crashed during an aborted takeoff from LaGuardia Airport. 2 people were killed.
- January 25, 1990 – Avianca Flight 052, a Boeing 707, crashed at Cove Neck, Long Island, after running out of fuel while attempting to land at John F. Kennedy International Airport. 73 people were killed.
- January 3, 1992 – CommutAir Flight 4821, a Beech 1900 operating for USAir Express, crashed on approach to Adirondack Regional Airport, killing 2.
- March 22, 1992 – USAir Flight 405, a Fokker F28, stalled and crashed into Flushing Bay on takeoff from LaGuardia Airport in icing conditions. 27 people were killed.
- July 30, 1992 – TWA Flight 843, a Lockheed L-1011, crashed and burst into flames after an aborted takeoff from JFK Airport. All 292 people on board were safely evacuated.
- July 17, 1996 – TWA Flight 800, a Boeing 747, exploded in midair and crashed into the Atlantic Ocean near East Moriches, killing all 230 people on board. The aircraft was climbing after takeoff from JFK Airport when a short circuit ignited the 747's center fuel tank.
- September 5, 1996 – FedEx Express Flight 1406, a DC-10, made an emergency landing at Stewart International Airport after suffering an in-flight fire. The 5 occupants evacuated safely.
- September 11, 2001 – American Airlines Flight 11, a Boeing 767, was hijacked by Al-Qaeda terrorists after takeoff from Boston during the September 11 attacks. The aircraft was subsequently crashed into the north tower of the World Trade Center in Manhattan, New York City, killing all 92 people on board including the five hijackers. An estimated 1600 people were killed on the ground.
- September 11, 2001 – United Airlines Flight 175, a Boeing 767, was hijacked after takeoff from Boston during the September 11 attacks. The aircraft was subsequently crashed into the south tower of the World Trade Center in Manhattan. All 65 on board were killed, as well as an estimated 900 on the ground.
- November 12, 2001 – American Airlines Flight 587, an Airbus A300, crashed in Belle Harbor, Queens, New York City, after takeoff from John F. Kennedy International Airport on November 12, 2001. The vertical stabilizer had detached due to excessive rudder movement. All 260 on board were killed, along with five people on the ground.
- January 15, 2009 – US Airways Flight 1549, an Airbus A320, ditched into the Hudson River after a bird strike caused a dual engine failure on climb-out from LaGuardia Airport. None of the 155 people on board were killed.
- February 12, 2009 – Colgan Air Flight 3407, a Bombardier Dash 8 operating for Continental Connection, stalled and crashed six miles from the runway at Buffalo Niagara International Airport. All 49 on board were killed, as well as one person on the ground.
- July 22, 2013 – Southwest Airlines Flight 345, a Boeing 737-700, suffered a nose gear collapse after touching down nose-first at LaGuardia Airport. 9 people were injured.
- March 5, 2015 – Delta Air Lines Flight 1086, a McDonnell Douglas MD-88, skidded off the runway on landing at LaGuardia Airport. Nobody was killed.
- March 22, 2026 – Air Canada Express Flight 8646, a Bombardier CRJ900 operated by Jazz Aviation, collided with a firetruck on landing at LaGuardia Airport. Both pilots were killed; all passengers, cabin crew, and occupants of the truck survived.

== North Carolina ==
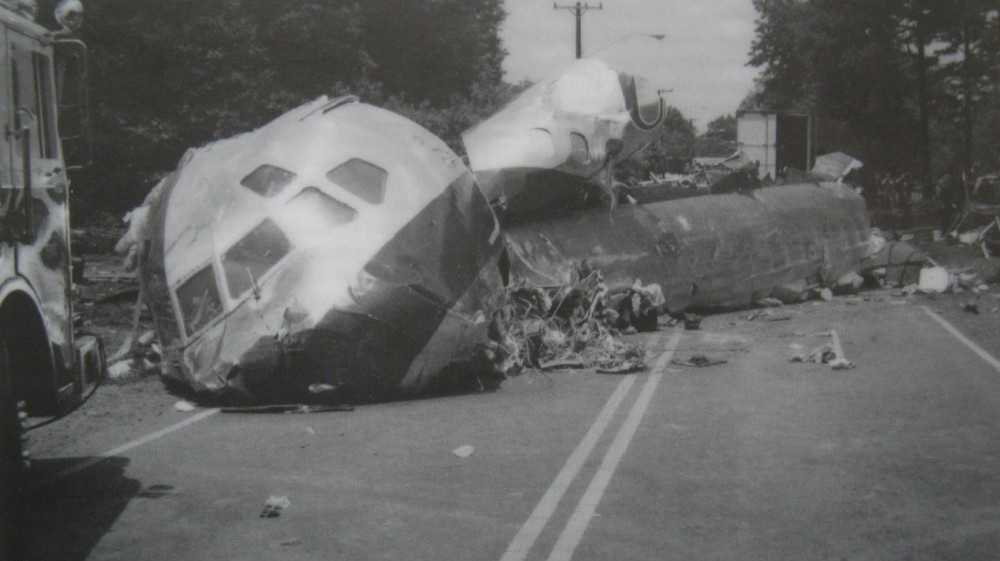
USAir Flight 1016

- January 6, 1960 – National Airlines Flight 2511, a Douglas DC-6, exploded over Bolivia, in a suspected suicide bombing. All 34 people on board were killed.
- July 19, 1967 – Piedmont Airlines Flight 22, a Boeing 727, collided with a Cessna 310 over Hendersonville, North Carolina, on July 19, 1967, killing all 82 on board both aircraft.
- September 11, 1974 – Eastern Air Lines Flight 212, a Douglas DC-9, crashed while attempting to land in thick fog at Douglas Municipal Airport, killing 71 on board.
- February 19, 1988 – AVAir Flight 3378, a Fairchild Metro, crashed into a reservoir after taking off from Raleigh–Durham International Airport, killing all 12 on board.
- July 2, 1994 – USAir Flight 1016, a McDonnell Douglas DC-9, crashed while attempting to land during a severe thunderstorm at Charlotte Douglas International Airport. Strong wind shear and a microburst caused the pilots to lose control of the aircraft; 37 people were killed and 20 survived.
- December 13, 1994 – Flagship Airlines Flight 3379, a Jetstream 32 operating for American Eagle, lost control and crashed on a go-around at Raleigh–Durham International Airport, killing 15 of the 20 on board.
- January 8, 2003 – Air Midwest Flight 5481, a Beech 1900 operating for US Airways Express, stalled and crashed into an airport hangar and burst into flames 37 seconds after departing Charlotte Douglas International Airport, killing all 21 on board.

== Ohio ==
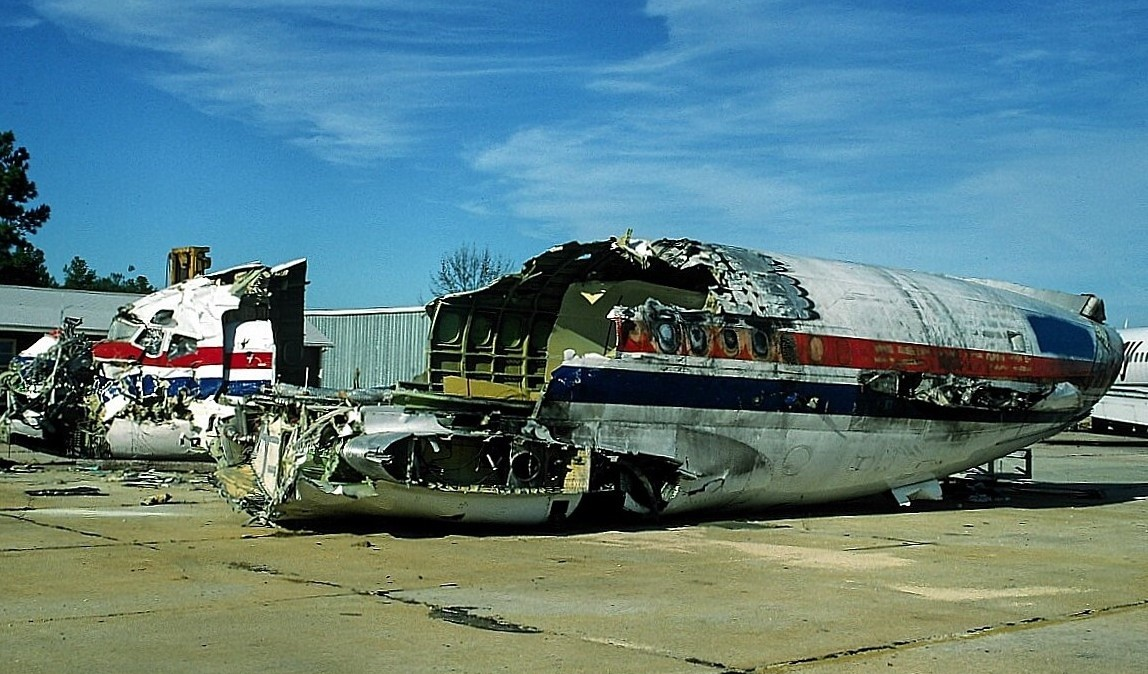
Ryan International Airlines Flight 590

- October 29, 1960 – a Curtiss C-46 operated by Arctic Pacific was carrying the Cal Poly Mustangs football team when it lost control and crashed on takeoff from Toledo Express Airport. 22 people were killed, including 16 players.
- March 5, 1967 – Lake Central Airlines Flight 527, a Convair 580, suffered a catastrophic propeller failure, leading to a loss of control and in-flight break-up near Marseilles. All 38 on board were killed.
- March 9, 1967 – TWA Flight 553, a DC-9, collided in midair with a Beechcraft Baron over Urbana, Ohio. All 26 people on both aircraft (one on the Baron) were killed.
- February 17, 1991 – Ryan International Airlines Flight 590, a DC-9, crashed on takeoff in icing conditions at Cleveland Hopkins International Airport, killing both crew members.
- February 15, 1992 – Air Transport International Flight 805, a Douglas DC-8 operating for Burlington Air Express, crashed on a go-around from Toledo Express Airport, killing all 4 crew members on board. In addition, 13 on the ground were injured.
- January 7, 1994 – United Express Flight 6291, a Jetstream 41 operated by Atlantic Coast Airlines, crashed on approach to Port Columbus International Airport, killing five of eight people on board.

== Oregon ==
- October 1, 1966 – West Coast Airlines Flight 956, a McDonnell Douglas DC-9, crashed south of Wemme, Oregon, killing all 18 on board. This was the first loss of a commercial Douglas DC-9.
- March 10, 1967 – West Coast Airlines Flight 720, a Fairchild F-27, crashed after takeoff from Klamath Falls, killing all four occupants.
- 28 December 1978 – United Airlines Flight 173, a Douglas DC-8, ran out of fuel and crashed while attempting to land near Portland, Oregon. 10 of 189 people on board were killed.
- January 5, 2024 – Alaska Airlines Flight 1282, a Boeing 737 MAX 9, suffered an uncontrolled decompression after a door plug blew out over Oregon. The aircraft made an emergency landing at Portland International Airport and there were no fatalities.

== Pennsylvania ==
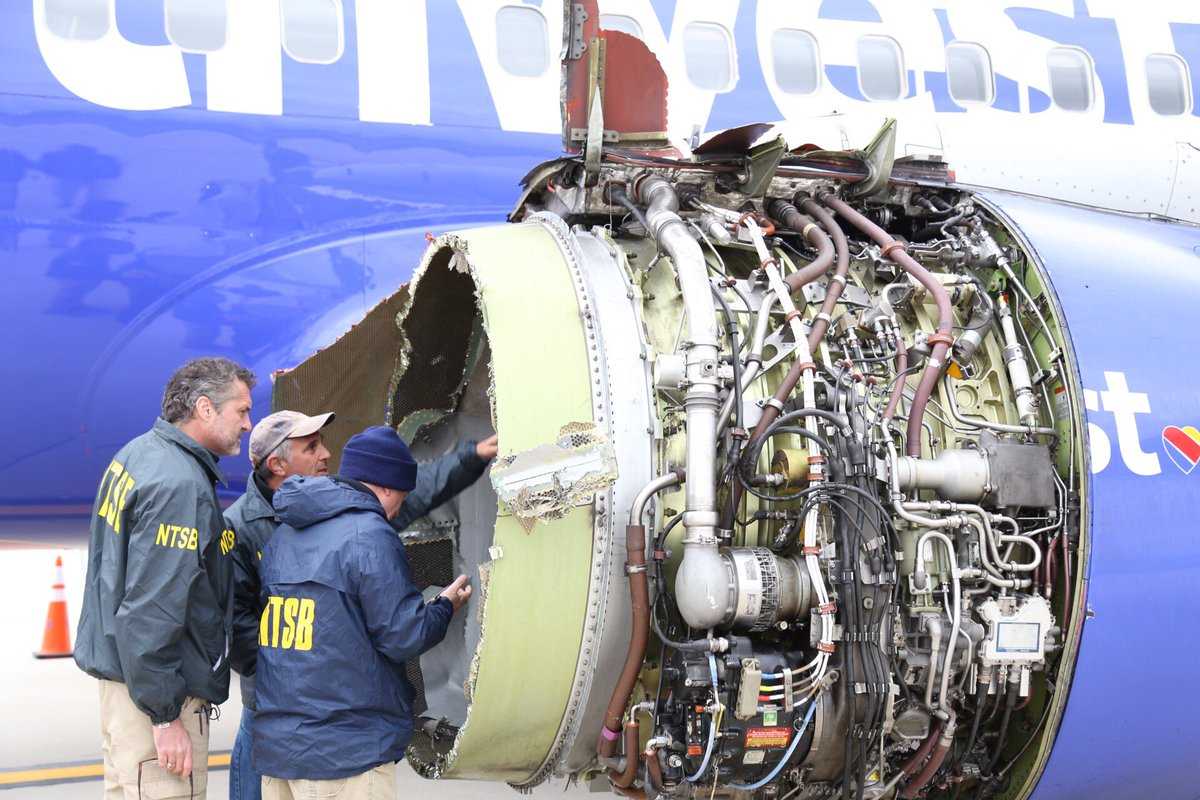
Damage to Southwest Airlines Flight 1380

- April 7, 1936 – TWA Flight 1, a Douglas DC-2, crashed into Cheat Mountain, near Uniontown, killing 12 of the 14 passengers and crew aboard.
- March 25, 1937 – TWA Flight 15A, a DC-2, crashed in Upper St. Clair Township in icing conditions, killing all 13 on board.
- July 11, 1946 – TWA Flight 513, a Lockheed L-049, crashed near Reading while on a training flight. 5 of the 6 crew on board were killed.
- June 17, 1948 – United Air Lines Flight 624, a DC-6, crashed outside of Aristes, after the crew had mishandled a false fire warning, leading to their incapacitation. All four crew and 39 passengers aboard were killed.
- January 14, 1951 – National Airlines Flight 83, a DC-4, overran the runway at Philadelphia International Airport and caught fire, killing 7 people. The accident was notable for the actions of the flight attendant Frankie Housley, who saved several people, and died after returning to the burning cabin to save more passengers.
- April 1, 1956 – TWA Flight 400, a Martin 4-0-4, crashed during takeoff from Greater Pittsburgh International Airport. 22 of the 36 people aboard were killed.
- December 1, 1959 – Allegheny Airlines Flight 371, a Martin 2-0-2, crashed on approach to Williamsport Regional Airport, killing 25 of 26 on board.
- July 23, 1965 – Allegheny Airlines Flight 604, a Convair CV-440, crashed after suffering an engine failure on takeoff from Williamsport Regional Airport. No one was killed.
- June 23, 1967 – Mohawk Airlines Flight 40, a BAC 1-11 lost control and crashed over Blossburg, Pennsylvania following an in-flight fire, killing all 34 people on board. It was the deadliest disaster in the airline's history.
- December 24, 1968 – Allegheny Airlines Flight 736, a Convair 580, crashed on approach to Bradford Regional Airport, killing 20 of the 47 people on board.
- January 6, 1969 – Allegheny Airlines Flight 737, a Convair 580, crashed on approach to Bradford Regional Airport, killing 11 of the 28 people on board.
- January 6, 1974 – Commonwealth Commuter Flight 317, a Beech 99, clipped the last tower of landing lights on final approach into the Johnstown–Cambria County Airport in Johnstown before slamming into an embankment. 12 of 17 people on board were killed.
- September 8, 1994 – USAir Flight 427, a Boeing 737-300, nosedived into the ground on its landing approach when the rudder malfunctioned near Pittsburgh. All 132 passengers and crew were killed on impact. It was the second incident of its type after United Airlines Flight 585 in Colorado.
- September 11, 2001 – United Airlines Flight 93, a Boeing 757, was hijacked after takeoff from Newark, New Jersey, as part of the September 11 attacks. Passengers fought the hijackers and the plane crashed into a field in Somerset County. All 44 on board were killed.
- April 17, 2018 – Southwest Airlines Flight 1380, a Boeing 737-700, suffered an uncontained engine failure, causing a passenger to get partially sucked out from a window and later die. The plane safely landed at Philadelphia International Airport.

== Rhode Island ==
- February 21, 1982 – Pilgrim Airlines Flight 458, a Twin Otter, made a forced landing on the frozen Scituate Reservoir after suffering an in-flight fire. 1 passenger died of smoke inhalation.

== South Carolina ==
- July 12, 1945 – Eastern Air Lines Flight 45, a Douglas DC-3, collided with a US Army Air Force A-26 Invader bomber over Lamar. The DC-3 made a forced landing in a corn field with only 1 fatality. The bomber crashed, killing 2 of the 3 crew; the survivor was able to parachute safely from the aircraft.

== South Dakota ==
- December 20, 1983 – Ozark Air Lines Flight 650, a McDonnell Douglas DC-9, struck a snow plow while landing at Sioux Falls Regional Airport during a snowstorm. The driver of the snow plow was the only casualty.

== Tennessee ==
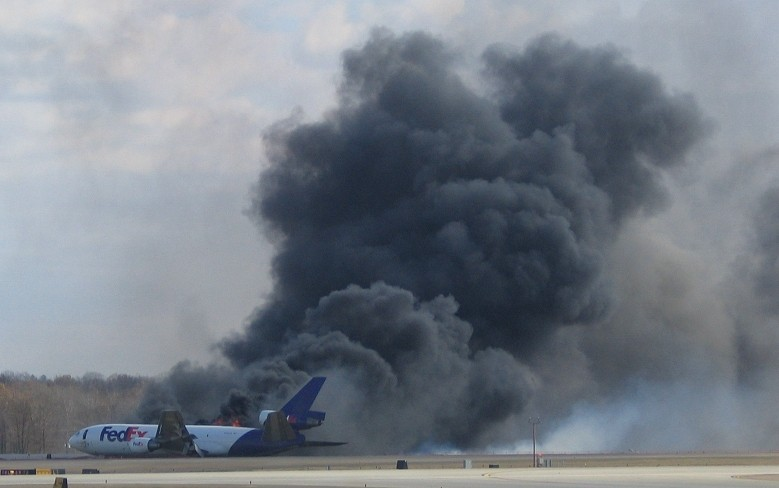
FedEx Flight 647 during the fire

- October 15, 1943 – American Airlines Flight 63, a Douglas DC-3, crashed after ice formed on the wings and propeller near Centerville. All 11 on board were killed.
- February 10, 1944 – American Airlines Flight 2, a Douglas DC-3, crashed into the Mississippi River, killing all 24 on board. The cause of the crash remains unknown.
- January 8, 1959 – Southeast Airlines Flight 308, a DC-3, crashed into Holston Mountain, killing all 10 on board.
- July 9, 1964 – United Air Lines Flight 823, a Vickers Viscount, crashed near Parrottsville after an uncontrollable fire broke out in the main cabin, killing all 39 passengers and crew.
- February 3, 1988 – American Airlines Flight 132, a McDonnell Douglas MD-83, made an emergency landing at Nashville International Airport after an in-flight fire broke out in the cargo hold. 18 people suffered injuries.
- December 18, 2003 – FedEx Express Flight 647, a McDonnell Douglas MD-10, suffered a landing gear collapse at Memphis International Airport. The aircraft veered off the runway and caught fire; all 7 people on board evacuated.
- July 28, 2006 – FedEx Express Flight 630, a McDonnell Douglas MD-10, suffered a landing gear collapse at Memphis International Airport. The aircraft veered off the runway and caught fire; the 3 people on board evacuated with injuries.

== Texas ==
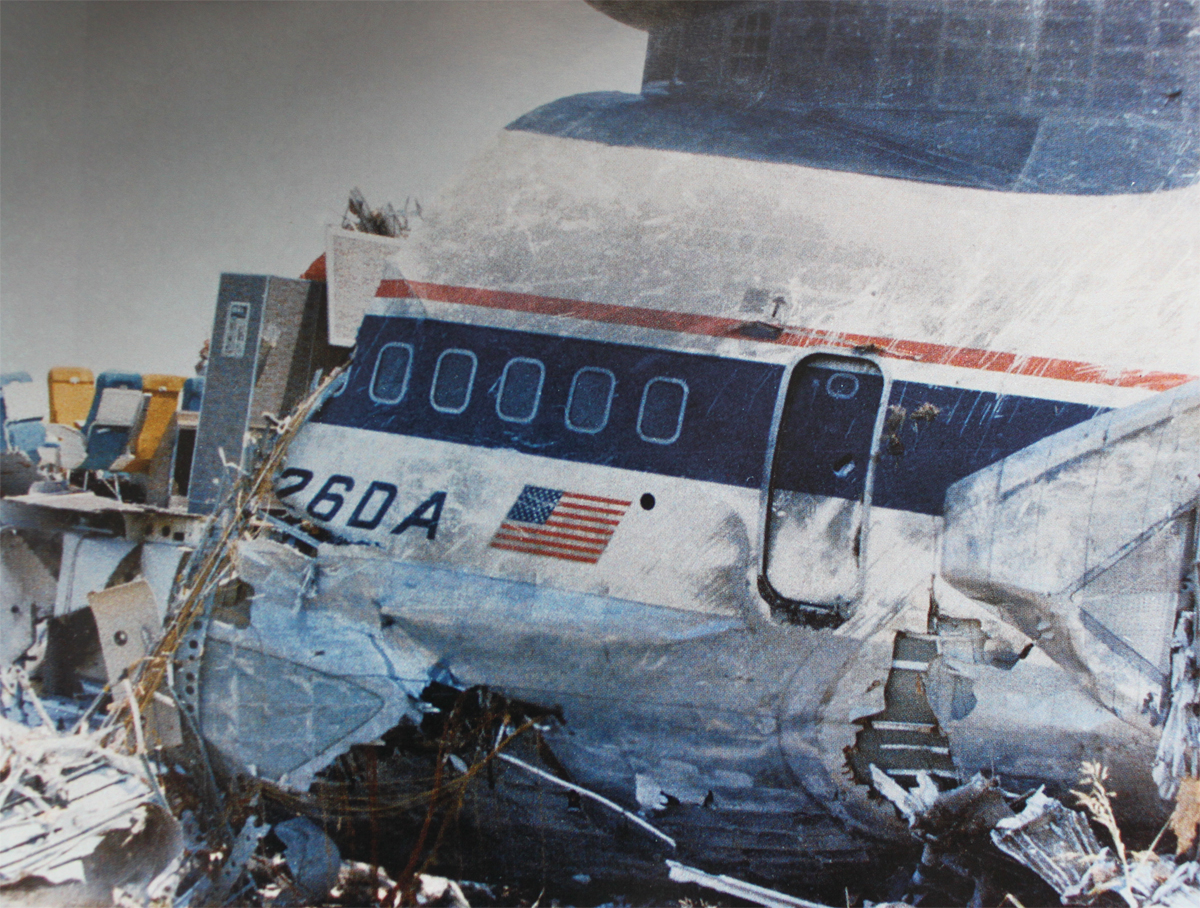
Part of the wreckage of Delta Flight 191

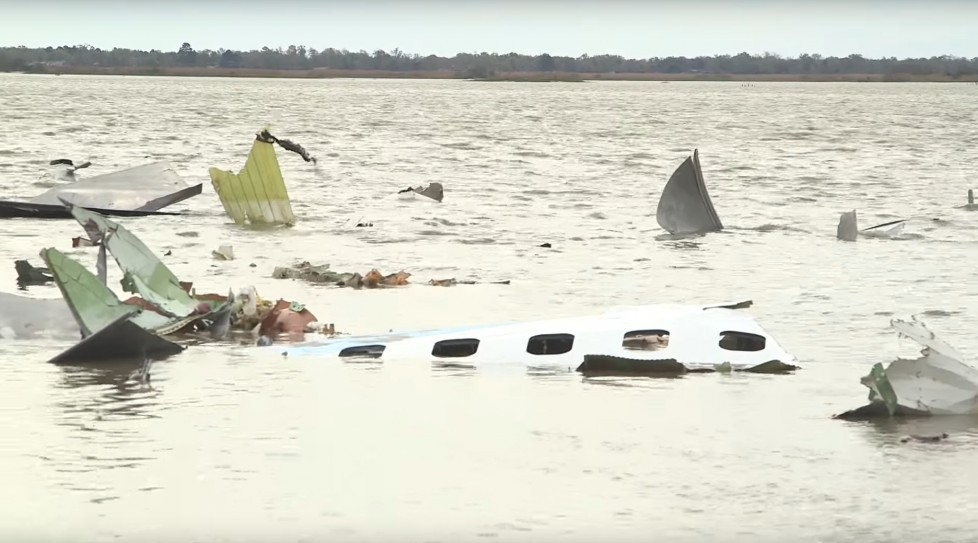
Crash site of Atlas Air Flight 3591

- November 29, 1949 – American Airlines Flight 157, a Douglas DC-6 crashed during final approach to Dallas Love Field after the pilot lost control when an engine failed. 28 people were killed.
- June 28, 1952 – American Airlines Flight 910, a Douglas DC-6, collided with a privately owned Temco Swift while on approach to Dallas Love Field. Both people on board the Swift were killed and the aircraft was destroyed; Flight 910 landed safely with no injuries or fatalities.
- May 17, 1953 – Delta Air Lines Flight 318, a Douglas DC-3, lost control and crashed east of Marshall, killing 19 of the 20 people on board.
- September 29, 1959 – Braniff Airways Flight 542, a Lockheed L-188, disintegrated in midair near Buffalo. All 34 passengers and crew were killed.
- May 3, 1968 – Braniff International Airways Flight 352, a Lockheed L-188, broke up in midair and crashed near Dawson after flying into a severe thunderstorm. All 85 on board were killed.
- May 30, 1972 – Delta Air Lines Flight 9570, a DC-9, crashed on landing during a training flight at Greater Southwest International Airport after encountering wake turbulence. All 4 crew were killed.
- August 2, 1985 – Delta Air Lines Flight 191, a Lockheed L-1011, crashed upon landing at Dallas Fort Worth International Airport after encountering a microburst. The aircraft struck a car and collided with 2 water tanks, killing 136 people on board as well as the occupant of the car.
- August 31, 1988 – Delta Air Lines Flight 1141, a Boeing 727, crashed after takeoff from Dallas Fort Worth Airport, killing 14 people. The NTSB determined that the flight crew had failed to deploy the plane's flaps prior to takeoff.
- March 18, 1989 – Evergreen International Airlines Flight 17, a DC-9, suffered a cargo door failure and lost control, killing both crew members.
- September 11, 1991 – Continental Express Flight 2574, an Embraer 120 operated by Britt Airways, suffered a structural failure on descent to Houston International Airport. The aircraft lost control and broke up near Eagle Lake, killing all 14 on board.
- April 14, 1993 – American Airlines Flight 102, a DC-10, suffered a runway excursion at Dallas Fort Worth International Airport. None of the 202 people on board were killed.
- January 27, 2009 – Empire Airlines Flight 8284, an ATR 42 operating for FedEx Feeder, crashed on final approach to Lubbock Preston Smith International Airport. Both crew members survived.
- March 27, 2012 – JetBlue Flight 191, an Airbus A320, diverted to Rick Husband Amarillo International Airport, after its captain suffered a severe mental breakdown while flying from New York to Las Vegas and had to be restrained by passengers. The co-pilot and a deadheading captain took over.
- February 23, 2019 – Atlas Air Flight 3591, a Boeing 767 operating for Amazon Air, nosedived into Trinity Bay as a result of spatial disorientation. All three crew members were killed.

== Utah ==
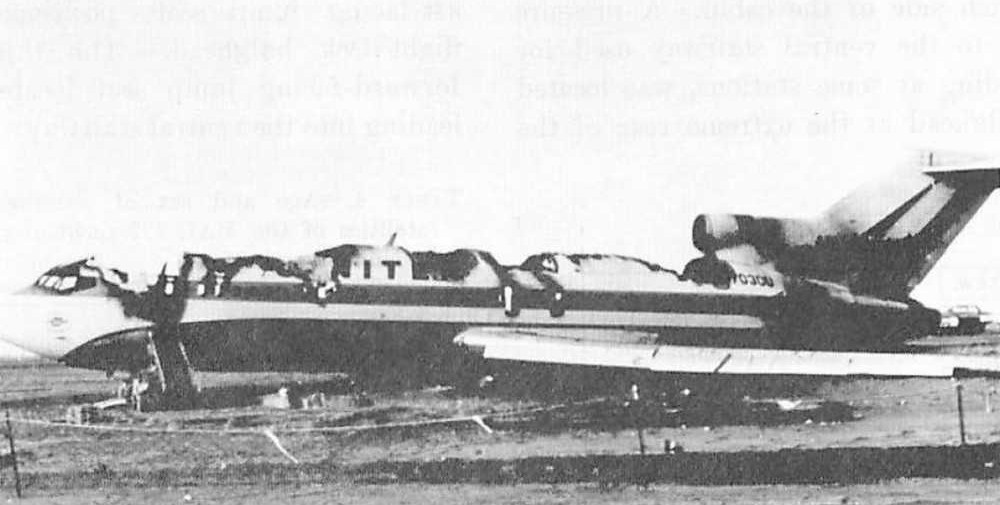
United Airlines Flight 227

- February 23, 1934 – a United Air Lines Boeing 247 crashed into Parley's canyon, Summit County, in bad weather. All 8 on board were killed.
- October 24, 1947 – United Air Lines Flight 608, a Douglas DC-6, crashed on approach to Bryce Canyon Airport, where it was making an emergency landing due to an in-flight fire. All 52 on board were killed.
- November 11, 1965 – United Air Lines Flight 227, a Boeing 727, crashed short of the runway and caught fire while attempting to land at Salt Lake City International Airport. 43 people were killed in the resulting fire.
- December 18, 1977 – United Airlines Flight 2860, a Douglas DC-8, crashed into the Wasatch Range, killing all 3 crew members on board.
- January 15, 1987 – SkyWest Airlines Flight 1834, a Fairchild Metro, collided in mid-air with a Mooney M20 near Salt Lake City. All 10 people on both aircraft were killed.
- August 11, 2000 – a passenger on board Southwest Airlines Flight 1763 attempted to storm the cockpit in an apparent case of air rage. He was subdued by other passengers and died due to asphyxiation.

== Virginia ==
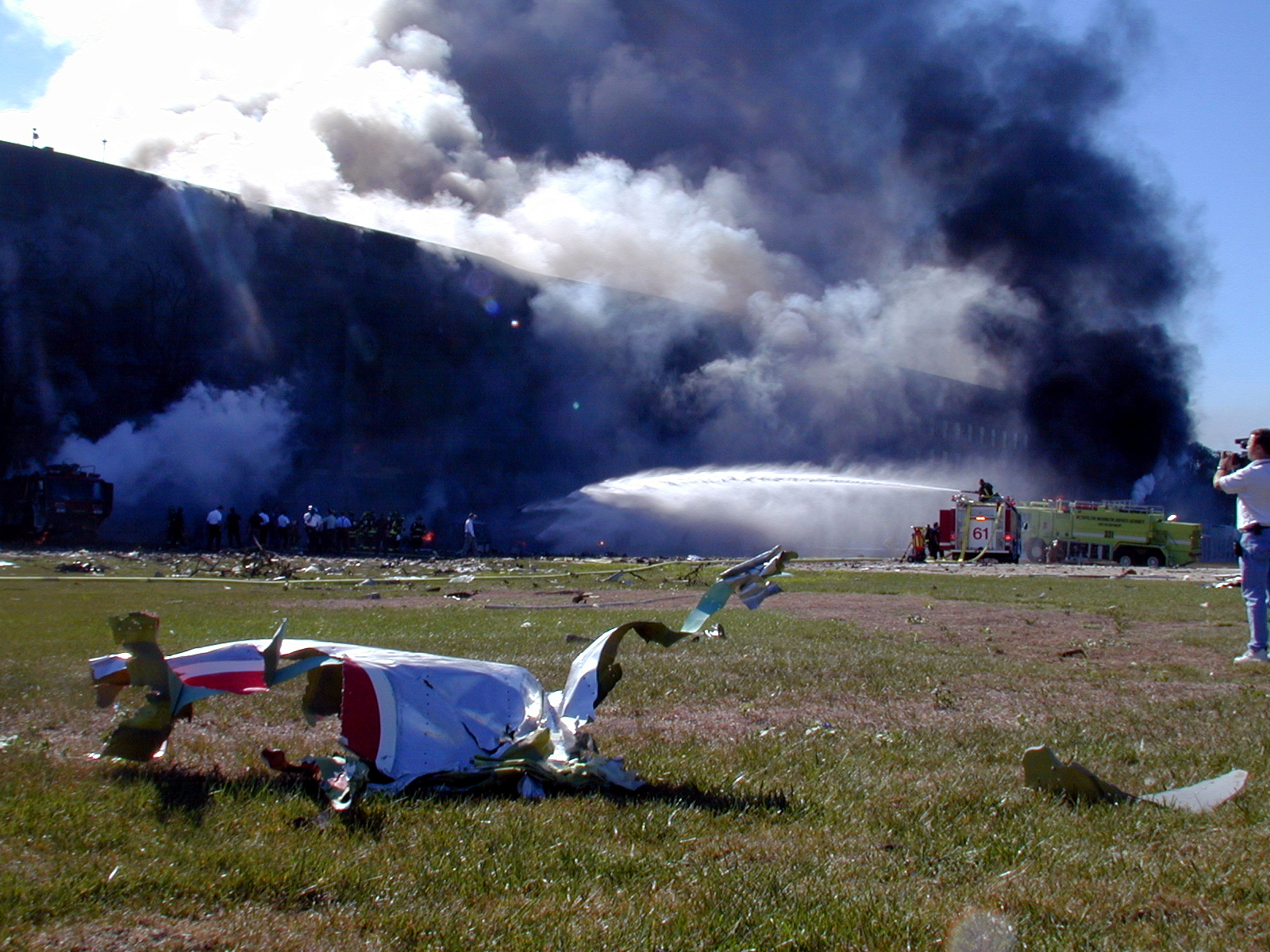
Crash site of American Airlines Flight 77

- August 31, 1940 – Pennsylvania Central Airlines Flight 19, a Douglas DC-3, crashed in a thunderstorm in Lovettsville, killing all 25 on board.
- January 12, 1947 – Eastern Air Lines Flight 665, a Douglas C-49, crashed in Fries, killing 18 of the 19 people on board.
- July 19, 1951 – Eastern Air Lines Flight 601, a Lockheed Constellation, crash-landed at Curles Neck farm, with no fatalities.
- October 30, 1959 – Piedmont Airlines Flight 349, a DC-3, crashed into Bucks Elbow Mountain near Crozet, killing all 3 crewmembers and 23 of 24 passengers.
- January 18, 1960 – Capital Airlines Flight 20, a Vickers Viscount, crashed into a farm in Charles City County, killing all 50 people on board.
- November 8, 1961 – Imperial Airlines Flight 201/8, a Lockheed L-049 chartered by the United States Army, crashed in Henrico County, killing 77 of the 79 people on board.
- December 1, 1974 – TWA Flight 514, a Boeing 727, crashed into Mount Weather during descent to Dulles International, killing all 92 on board.
- November 15, 1979 – American Airlines Flight 444, a Boeing 727, was attacked by the Unabomber. The bomb in the cargo hold failed to explode, but smoke filled the cabin, resulting in 12 passengers needing medical treatment.
- September 23, 1985 – Henson Airlines Flight 1517, a Beech 99 operating for Piedmont Commuter, crashed in Grottoes, killing all 14 on board.
- June 9, 1996 – Eastwind Airlines Flight 517, a Boeing 737, suffered an in-flight rudder malfunction on approach. The pilot was able to regain control of the plane, and the aircraft landed safely with only a single injury at Richmond International Airport. It was the third rudder malfunction of a Boeing 737 after United Airlines Flight 585 and USAir Flight 427; as this aircraft hadn't crashed, investigators were able to study the rudder system and resolve the cause of all three incidents.
- December 12, 1996 – Airborne Express Flight 827, a DC-8, crashed on a functional evaluation flight in Narrows, killing all 6 on board.
- September 11, 2001 – American Airlines Flight 77, a Boeing 757, was hijacked after takeoff from Dulles as part of the September 11 attacks. The hijackers crashed the aircraft into the Pentagon. 189 people were killed in total; all 64 on board the flight and 125 on the ground.

== Washington ==
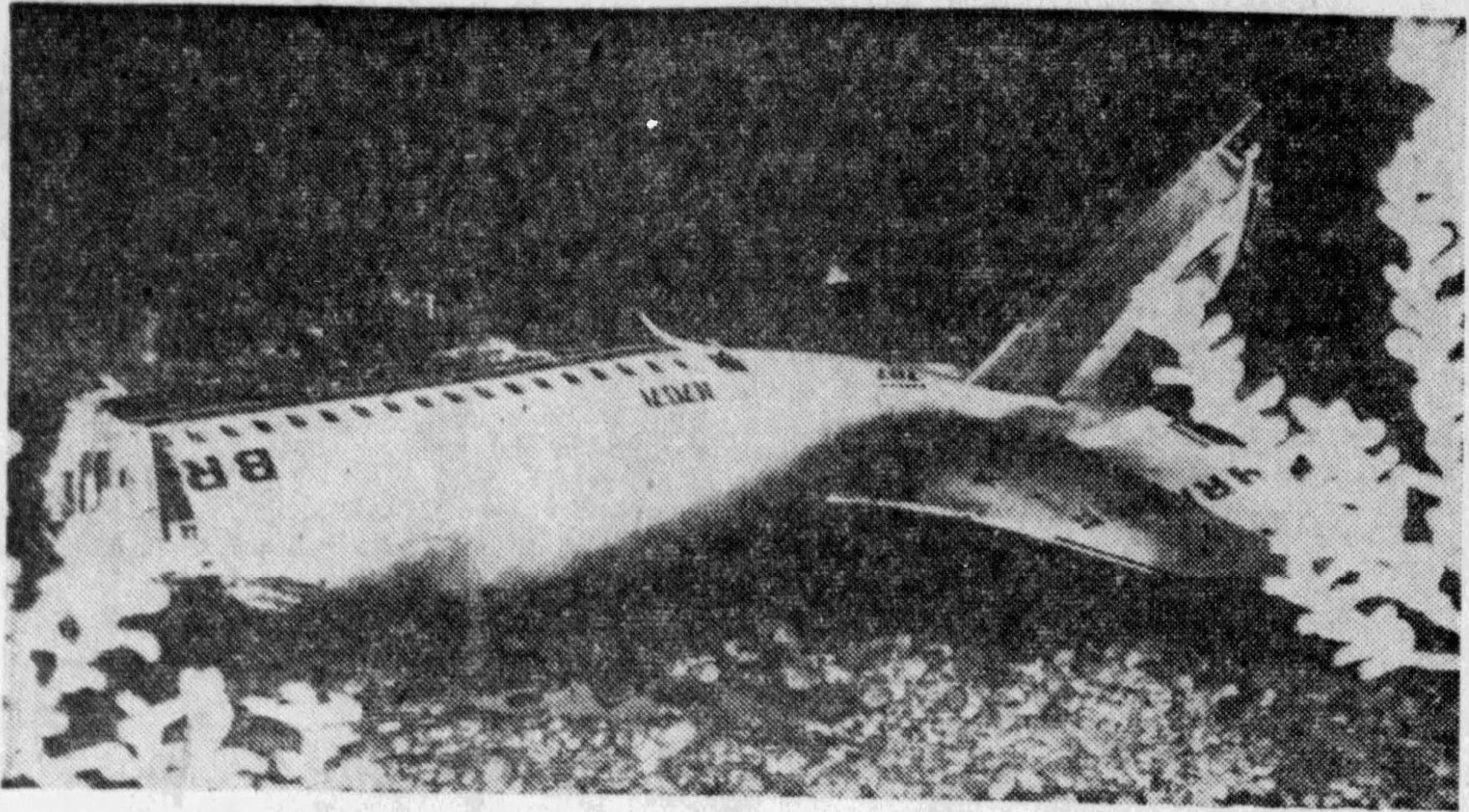
Wreckage of N7071, the Boeing 707 that crashed in 1959

- April 2, 1956 – Northwest Orient Airlines Flight 2, a Boeing 377, ditched into Puget Sound shortly after takeoff from the Seattle-Tacoma International Airport on April 2, 1956. All of those aboard survived the ditching and escaped the aircraft before it sank, but four passengers and one flight attendant subsequently died.
- October 19, 1959 – a Boeing 707 crashed on an acceptance flight, killing 4 of the 8 crew on board. 3 engines had separated from the aircraft after the pilots made excessive maneuvers to the aircraft.
- November 24, 1971 – Northwest Airlines Flight 305 was hijacked by a man using the alias "D. B. Cooper". Cooper ransomed the passengers for $200,000 and four parachutes, and then later jumped from the plane over Washington. Cooper was never seen again, and the case remains the only unsolved US aircraft hijacking.
- April 15, 1988 – Horizon Air Flight 2658, a De Havilland Canada Dash 8, suffered an engine fire while returning to Seattle–Tacoma International Airport. On landing, the aircraft skidded off the runway and collided with several baggage carts and jetways. 31 people were injured.
- December 26, 1989 – United Express Flight 2415, a Jetstream 31 operated by North Pacific Airlines, crashed on approach to Pasco Airport, killing all 6 on board.
- August 10, 2018 – a Horizon Air Q400 was stolen and intentionally crashed by an airline employee at Ketron Island. He was the only casualty.
- September 4, 2022 – a West Isle Air DHC-3 operating for Friday Harbor Seaplanes crashed into Mutiny Bay after suffering a mechanical failure of the horizontal stabilizer. All 10 on board were killed.

== West Virginia ==
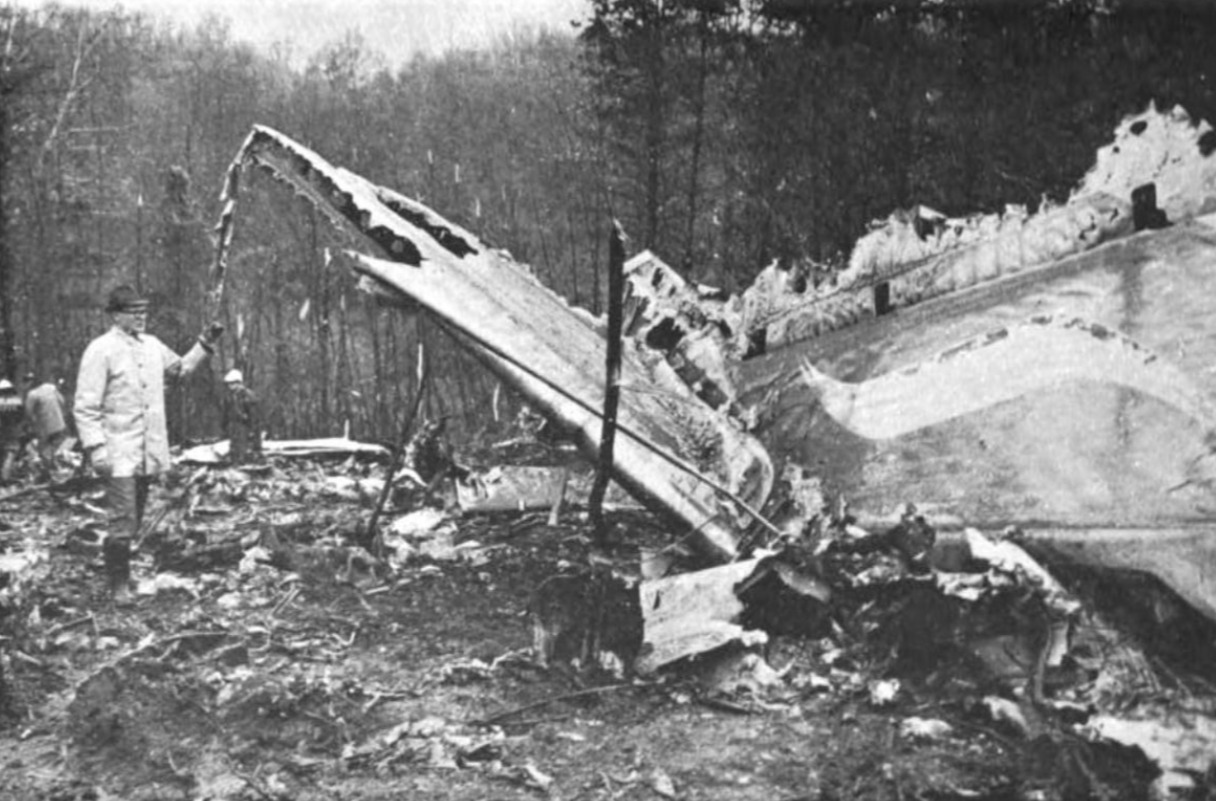
Southern Airways Flight 932

- June 13, 1947 – Pennsylvania Central Airlines Flight 410, a Douglas DC-4, crashed into the Blue Ridge Mountains due to pilot error. All 50 people on board were killed.
- August 10, 1968 – Piedmont Airlines Flight 230, a Fairchild F-27, crashed short of the runway at Charleston Yeager Airport, killing 35 of the 37 on board.
- November 14, 1970 – Southern Airways Flight 932, a DC-9 carrying the Marshall University Marshall Thundering Herd football squad, crashed near Huntington-Tri-State/Milton Airport, killing all on board.
- July 13, 2009 – Southwest Airlines Flight 2294, a Boeing 737-300, made an emergency landing at Yeager Airport in Charleston, after structural damage led to rapid depressurization of the passenger cabin. No fatalities occurred.

== Wisconsin ==
- August 29, 1948 – Northwest Orient Airlines Flight 421, a Martin 2-0-2, crashed near the Wisconsin-Minnesota border near Winona, in a severe thunderstorm. 37 people were killed.
- June 29, 1972 – the Lake Winnebago mid-air collision occurred when Air Wisconsin Flight 671, a Twin Otter, and North Central Airlines Flight 290, a Convair CV-580, collided over Lake Winnebago. All 13 people aboard both aircraft were killed. The NTSB was unable to determine why the pilots were unable to detect each other and took no evasive action.
- September 6, 1985 – Midwest Express Airlines Flight 105, a DC-9, crashed just after takeoff from General Mitchell Airport, Milwaukee, when the pilots reacted incorrectly to an uncontained engine failure. All 31 passengers and crew on board died.

== Wyoming ==
- October 7, 1935 – United Air Lines Flight 4, a Boeing 247, crashed near Silver Crown, killing all 12 on board.
- February 6, 1954 – Western Air Lines Flight 34, a Convair CV-240, crashed in bad weather near Wright, killing all 9 on board.
- October 6, 1955 – United Air Lines Flight 409, a Douglas DC-4, crashed into Medicine Bow Peak, near Centennial, killing all 66 people on board. At the time, this was the worst crash in U.S. commercial aviation history.

== U.S. territories ==
=== American Samoa ===
- January 11, 1938 – The Samoan Clipper, one of 10 Pan American Airways Sikorsky S-42 flying boats, exploded over Pago Pago, killing all 7 on board.
- January 30, 1974 – Pan Am Flight 806, a Boeing 707, crashed on approach to Pago Pago International Airport, killing 97 people on board.

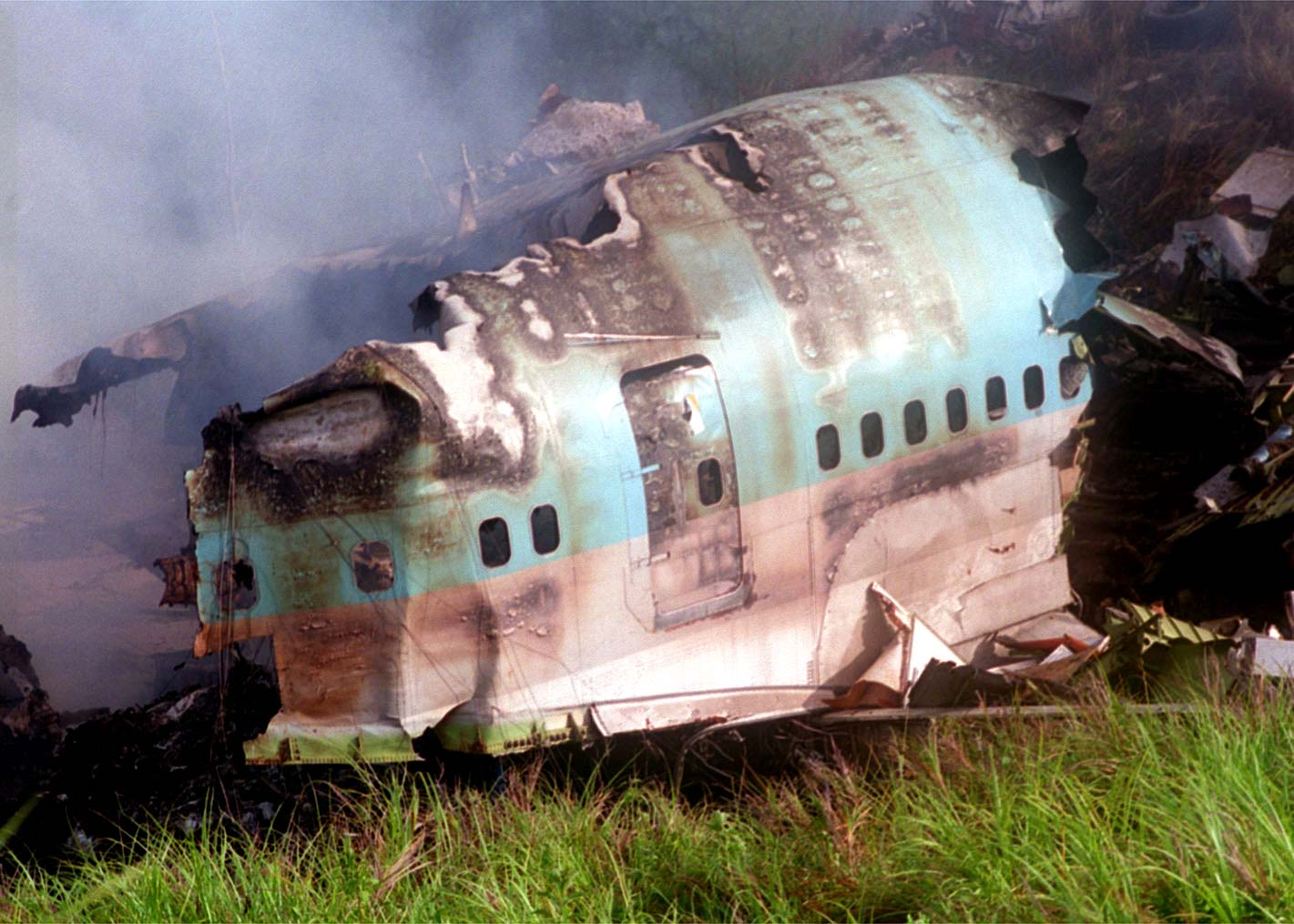
Korean Air Flight 801

=== Guam ===
- August 6, 1997 – Korean Air Flight 801, a Boeing 747 crashed on approach to Antonio B. Won Pat International Airport. Of the 254 people aboard the Boeing 747, 229 were killed in the crash.

=== Puerto Rico ===
- 7 June 1949 - a Curtiss C-46 operated by Strato-Freight crashed into the Atlantic Ocean west of Puerto Rico, killing 53.
- 5 March 1969 - Prinair Flight 277, a De Havilland Heron, cashed into a mountain in Fajardo, killing 19.
- 24 June 1972 - Prinair Flight 191, a De Havilland Heron, crashed while landing at Mercedita Airport. Ponce, killing 5.
- 19 December 1977 - a Britten-Norman Islander operated by Vieques Air Link crashed off the coast of Vieques, killing 5 of the 10 on board.
- 26 September 1978 - Air Caribbean Flight 309, a Beechcraft 18, crashed into a bar while landing at Isla Verde International Airport in San Juan, killing 6.
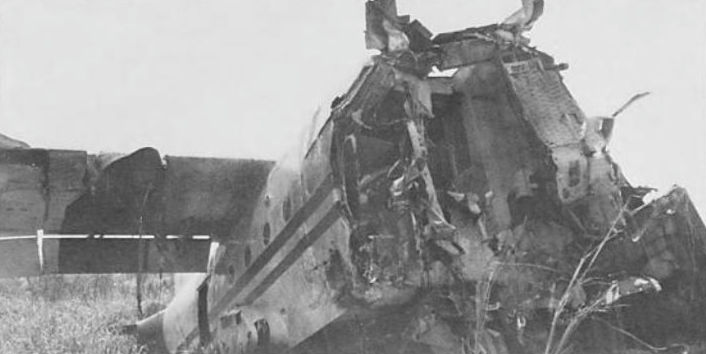
  Wreckage of American Eagle Flight 5452
- 2 August 1984 - Vieques Air Link Flight 901A, a Britten-Norman Islander, crashed after take-off from Vieques Airport, killing 8.
- 8 May 1987 - American Eagle Flight 5452, a CASA C-212 operated by Executive Air Charter, crashed on a go-around at Eugenio María de Hostos Airport, killing 2 of the 6 on board.
- 7 June 1992 - American Eagle Flight 5456, a CASA C-212 operated by Executive Air Charter, crashed on approach to Eugenio María de Hostos Airport, killing all 5 on board.
- 2 December 2013 - IBC Airways Flight 405, a Fairchild Metro III, suffered an in-flight breakup over Puerto Rico, killing both pilots.

=== U.S. Virgin Islands ===
- December 28, 1970 – Trans Caribbean Airways Flight 505, a Boeing 727, overran the runway at St. Thomas Airport, killing 2 of the 55 on board.
- April 27, 1976 – American Airlines Flight 625, a Boeing 727, overran the runway at St. Thomas Airport due to pilot error. 35 passengers and 2 crew out of the 88 on board were killed.

== Deadliest incidents ==
This is a list of all airliner accidents and incidents in the United States and its territories that have resulted in 100 or more fatalities. They are listed by death toll and include any ground fatalities and injuries, as well as any survivors on board the aircraft.

A more extensive and globally inclusive list of deadliest aircraft accidents and incidents is also available.

† Was previously the deadliest airliner accident or incident.

	Date	Fatalities	Injuries	Survivors	Article	Location	Comments
1.	September 11, 2001	c. 1,700 (including 92 on aircraft; 2,763 total combined with United Airlines Flight 175)	c. 6,000–25,000 (combined with United Airlines Flight 175) (Note: Sources vary regarding the number of injuries―some say 6,000 while others go as high as 25,000.)	0	American Airlines Flight 11	1 World Trade Center (North Tower), New York City, New York	One of four flights involved in the September 11 attacks
2.	September 11, 2001	c. 679 (including 65 on aircraft; 2,763 total combined with American Airlines Flight 11)	c. 6,000–25,000 (combined with American Airlines Flight 11) (Note: Sources vary regarding the number of injuries―some say 6,000 while others go as high as 25,000.)	0	United Airlines Flight 175	2 World Trade Center (South Tower), New York City, New York	One of four flights involved in the September 11 attacks
3.	May 25, 1979 †	273 (including 2 on the ground)	2 (ground)	0	American Airlines Flight 191	Des Plaines, Illinois	
4.	November 12, 2001	265 (including 5 on the ground)	1 (ground)	0	American Airlines Flight 587	Queens, New York	
5.	July 17, 1996	230	0	0	TWA Flight 800	Atlantic Ocean, near Moriches, New York	
6.	August 6, 1997	229	25	25	Korean Air Flight 801	Nimitz Hill, Guam	The only incident in a US territory to result over 100 fatalities.
7.	October 31, 1999	217	0	0	EgyptAir Flight 990	Atlantic Ocean, near Nantucket, Massachusetts	
8.	September 11, 2001	189 (including 125 on the ground)	106 (ground)	0	American Airlines Flight 77	The Pentagon in Arlington, Virginia	One of four flights involved in the September 11 attacks
9.	August 16, 1987	156 (including 2 on the ground)	6 (including 5 on the ground)	1	Northwest Airlines Flight 255	Romulus, Michigan, (a suburb of Detroit)	
10.	July 9, 1982	153 (including 8 on the ground)	4 (ground)	0	Pan Am Flight 759	Kenner, Louisiana	
11.	September 25, 1978 †	144 (including 7 on the ground)	9 (ground)	0	PSA Flight 182	San Diego, California	
12.	August 2, 1985	137 (including 1 on the ground)	28 (including 1 on the ground)	27	Delta Air Lines Flight 191	Dallas/Fort Worth International Airport, Texas	Two passengers who survived the initial crash died months later.
13.	December 16, 1960 †	134 (including 6 on the ground)	N/A	0	1960 New York mid-air collision	Brooklyn, New York, and Staten Island, New York	One passenger, an 11-year-old boy who was on United Airlines Flight 826, survived the initial crash but died of pneumonia the next day.
14.	September 8, 1994	132	0	0	USAir Flight 427	Pittsburgh, Pennsylvania	
15.	June 30, 1956 †	128	0	0	1956 Grand Canyon mid-air collision	Grand Canyon, Arizona	
16.	June 24, 1975	113	11	11	Eastern Air Lines Flight 66	Jamaica, New York	One passenger who survived the initial crash died nine days later due to their injuries.
17.	July 19, 1989	112	171	184	United Airlines Flight 232	Sioux City, Iowa	The official number of fatalities was 111. One passenger who survived the initial crash died 31 days later due to their injuries. (Note: The final report classified this passenger as a survivor with "serious" injuries. The regulation legally defines "fatal injury" as an injury resulting in death within 30 days after the accident.)
18.	September 4, 1971	111	0	0	Alaska Airlines Flight 1866	Pacific Ocean, near Juneau, Alaska	
19.	May 11, 1996	110	0	0	ValuJet Flight 592	Florida Everglades, Florida	
20.	June 3, 1963	101	0	0	Northwest Airlines Flight 293	Pacific Ocean, near Annette Island, Alaska	
20.	December 29, 1972	101	75	75	Eastern Air Lines Flight 401	Florida Everglades, Florida	
