= The President's Plane Is Missing =

The President's Plane Is Missing may refer to:

- The President's Plane Is Missing (novel)
- The President's Plane Is Missing (film)
