= Scandinavian Airlines System Flight 933 =

1969 aviation accident

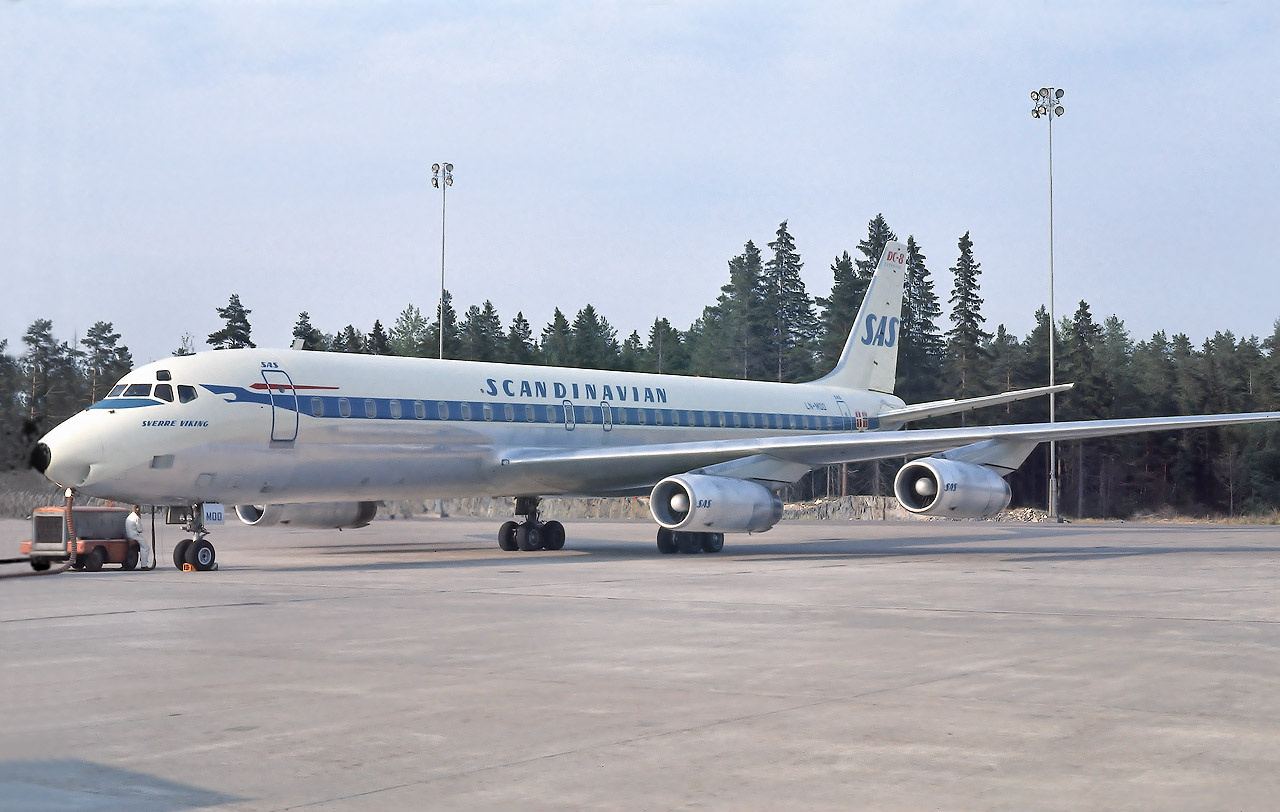
- LN-MOO, the DC-8 involved, seen in July 1967 at Stockholm Arlanda Airport

Accident
- Date: January 13, 1969
- Summary: Controlled flight into water caused by pilot error
- Site: Santa Monica Bay, Los Angeles, California, United States; 33°55′14″N 118°31′58″W

Aircraft
- Aircraft type: Douglas DC-8-62
- Aircraft name: Sverre Viking
- Operator: Scandinavian Airlines System
- IATA flight No.: SK933
- ICAO flight No.: SAS933
- Call sign: SCANDINAVIAN 933
- Registration: LN-MOO
- Flight origin: Copenhagen Airport
- Stopover: Seattle–Tacoma International Airport
- Destination: Los Angeles International Airport
- Occupants: 45
- Passengers: 36
- Crew: 9
- Fatalities: 15
- Injuries: 17
- Survivors: 30

Scandinavian Airlines System Flight 933 was a scheduled international flight from Copenhagen-Kastrup Airport (Denmark) to Los Angeles International Airport via Seattle—Tacoma International Airport. On January 13, 1969, the McDonnell Douglas DC-8 crashed into Santa Monica Bay at 19:21, approximately six nautical miles (11 km) west of Los Angeles International Airport. The crash into the sea was caused by pilot error during approach to runway 07R; the pilots were so occupied with the nose gear light not turning green that they lost awareness of the situation and failed to keep track of their altitude. The Scandinavian Airlines System (SAS) aircraft had a crew of nine and 36 passengers, of whom 15 died in the accident.

The crash was similar to Eastern Air Lines Flight 401. The crash site was in international waters, but the National Transportation Safety Board carried out an investigation, which was published on July 1, 1970. The report stated the probable cause as improper crew resource management and stated that the aircraft was fully capable of carrying out the approach and landing. The aircraft was conducting an instrument approach, but was following an unauthorized back course approach.

== Flight ==
The accident aircraft was a McDonnell Douglas DC-8-62 with serial number 45822 and line number 270. It was originally registered in the United States by McDonnell Douglas as N1501U for testing before delivery to SAS. It was then registered as LN-MOD, but as SAS already had a Douglas DC-7 with that registration, it was re-registered as LN-MOO. The aircraft was registered on June 23, 1967, and named "Sverre Viking" by SAS. Five days later, it was reregistered with Norwegian Air Lines, the Norwegian holding company of the SAS conglomerate, as owner. The DC-8-62 model had been custom-made by McDonnell Douglas for SAS to operate to Los Angeles with a full payload in all wind conditions, although the model was later sold to other airlines as well. SAS took delivery of the first of ten DC-8-62 aircraft in 1967. "Sverre Viking" had flown 6,948 hours as of January 7 and had met all maintenance requirements. The last overhaul had been carried out on April 3, 1968.

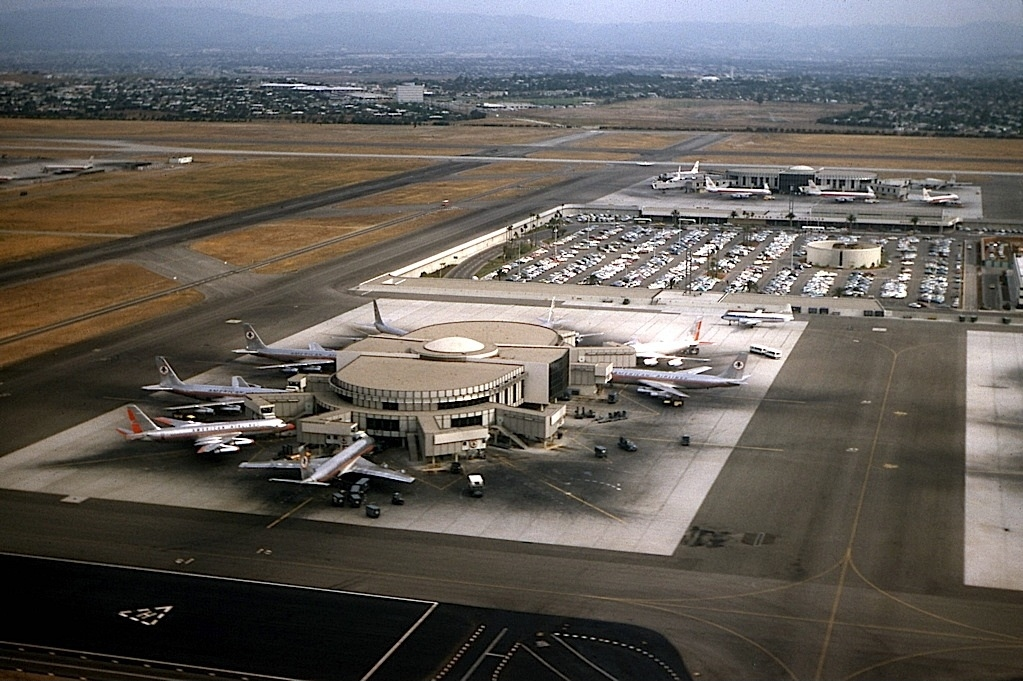
Contemporary view of Los Angeles International Airport

Flight 933 was a regular, international scheduled flight from SAS's main hub at Copenhagen Airport in Denmark to Los Angeles International Airport in Los Angeles, California, in the United States. It had a scheduled stopover at Seattle–Tacoma International Airport in the state of Washington for change of crew and refueling. There were 45 people on board the aircraft at the time of the accident consisting of 36 passengers and nine crew members.

The crew outbound from Seattle had flown a flight from Copenhagen on January 11 and had about 48 hours of rest before the flight. The crew consisted of a captain, a first officer, a flight engineer and six flight attendants. Captain Kenneth Davies, a 50-year-old Briton, had been employed by SAS since 1948 and had a past in RAF Coastal Command. He had flown 11,135 hours with SAS and 900 hours in the DC-8. First Officer Hans Ingvar Hansson was 40 and had worked for SAS since 1957. He had flown 5,814 hours for the airline, including 973 hours in the DC-8. Flight Engineer Ake Ingvar Andersson, 32, had worked for SAS since 1966. He had flown 985 hours, all on a DC-8. All three had valid certificates, training, and medical checks.

The cabin crew consisted of Renning Lenshoj, Arne Roosand, Peter Olssen, Marie Britt Larsson, Susanne Gothberg-Ingeborg, and Ann-Charlotte Jennings. A steward and two stewardesses were killed in the crash, though remains of only one of the three were found.

The flight to Seattle had gone without incident. The landing took place with an instrument landing system (ILS) approach, with the autopilot being used down to 100 to 60 meters (330 to 200 ft) before a manual completion. The aircraft had three maintenance issues at Seattle consisting of a non-functioning fast–slow airspeed function, low oil on the number one engine, and a non-functioning lavatory light. The final crew arrived at Seattle–Tacoma an hour before the flight and was given necessary documentation. Flight time was estimated at two hours, 16 minutes. All preflight checks were concluded without discrepancies. The aircraft was de-iced and the altimeters set and cross-checked. The flight departed Seattle at 15:46 Pacific Standard Time (PST), one hour and eleven minutes after schedule. The first officer was designated as pilot flying. The altimeters were recalibrated and the autopilot was used for the climb and cruise.

== Approach and landing ==
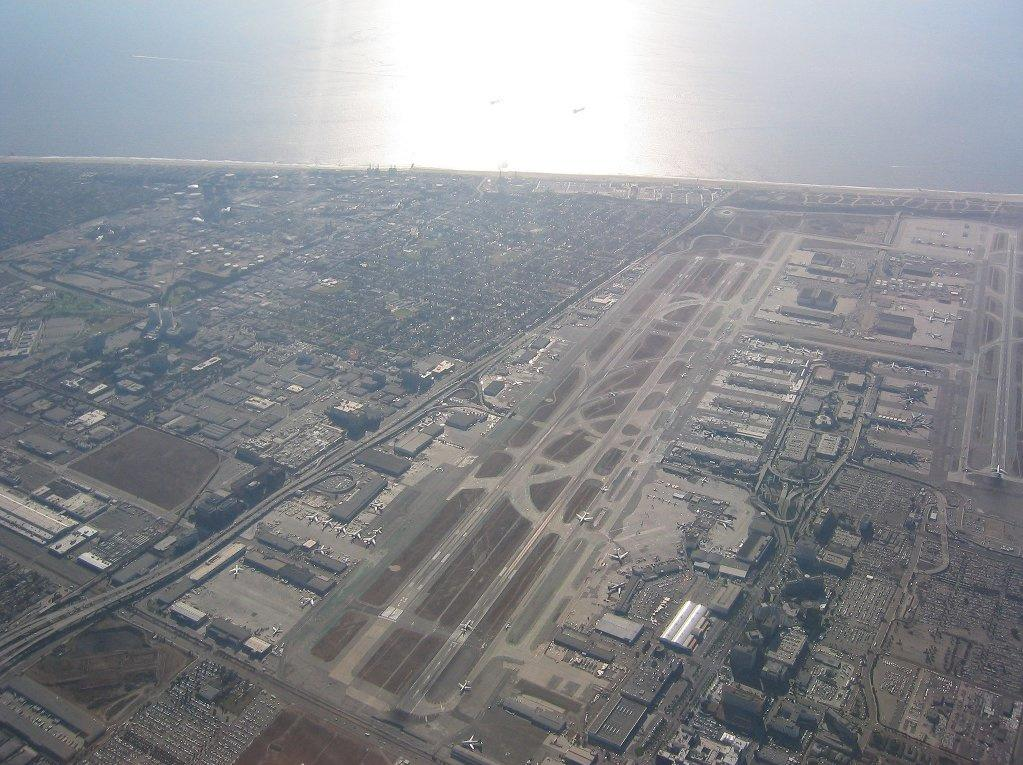
Modern aerial view of Los Angeles International Airport—runway 07R–25L is located to the left and Santa Monica Bay in the background.

Slightly after 17:20, an airline dispatcher confirmed that the weather was suitable at LAX for the landing. The aircraft made contact with Los Angeles Air Route Traffic Control Center at 17:32 and were told to hold at Bakersfield. This holding was confirmed at 17:47. At 18:39, the aircraft was cleared to descend via Fillmore and to maintain an altitude of 1,500 m (5,000 ft) via the newly designated Westlake Intersection, which was not yet on the charts. The crew was to conduct a back course ILS at LAX, although they lacked authorization and plates to conduct this. The weather at 19:00 consisted of scattered clouds at 300 m (1,000 ft), ceiling-measured 500 m (1,600 ft) overcast, visibility of 2.5 mi (4.0 km) and light rain and fog.

The sky was dark and the pilots lacked any visual ground references. Descent was controlled through the use of the vertical-speed wheel of the autopilot combined with an altitude preselect (which illuminated a light when reaching preselected altitudes) in manual mode. While retaining use of the autopilot, the pilots reduced their speed to 160 knots (300 km/h; 180 mph) at the request of air traffic control at 19:07. At this point the pilots were working through the approach checklist. The captain halted the checklist at the point regarding the radio altimeter as the aircraft was above its operational limit and he wanted to control the plane's operation during further descent. At 19:11, the aircraft received permission to bear 180 degrees and descend to and maintain 1,000 metres (3,000 ft) of altitude. Both navigational receivers were tuned to the ILS frequency.

At 19:17:55, the controller requested that SK933 reduce its speed to 153 knots (283 km/h; 176 mph) which was confirmed. At 19:19:05, the controller confirmed that the aircraft was cleared for approach for Runway 07R. At the time, the first officer thought the aircraft was 14 nautical miles (26 km; 16 mi) from the VHF omnidirectional range (VOR) transmitter, while the captain thought they were 11 to 12 nautical miles (20 to 22 km; 13 to 14 mi) away. The first officer therefore disconnected the autopilot. The captain put the landing gear down and the first officer asked for the landing checklist to be completed. This was interrupted by radio traffic and cockpit activities. The aircraft then descended to a minimum altitude of 176 m (600 ft).

The DC-8 was following a Cessna 177 Cardinal, designated 67T, also conducting a back-course approach, Airspeed 110 knots (200 km/h; 130 mph). All communication between the two aircraft and air traffic control were occurring on the same frequency. Air traffic control asked SK933 at 19:19:35 to reduce its speed further due to the Cessna ahead. The pilots reduced their speed to 126 knots (233 km/h; 145 mph). This speed requires the full extension of the flaps, but this step was not carried out. The nose gear was showing an unsafe indication; should the flaps be extended fully without the nose gear down, a horn would sound which could not be silenced without retracting the flaps. The captain recycled the gear, but the indicator light still showed an unsafe condition. Meanwhile, the first officer believed that the flaps were fully extended and started reducing speed to 126 knots (233 km/h; 145 mph). After the flight engineer confirmed that the nose gear was down and locked, the captain fully extended the flaps.

The flight engineer carried out a systems check, first from memory and then after consulting the flight manual. At this time, 19:20:42, the captain informed air traffic control that he was experiencing nose-gear problems that, if not resolved by the time the aircraft reached minimum altitude, would force him to cancel the landing and divert to the designated alternate, McCarran International Airport (now Harry Reid International Airport) in Las Vegas. This was the last transmission from Flight 933. The flight engineer conducted a manual check of the landing gear from the cockpit peephole confirming it was down and locked. At this time, the aircraft had an altitude of 300 m (1,000 ft). The lowest speed that the pilots remembered was 130 knots (240 km/h; 150 mph) with full flap extension.

Minutes before impact, the aircraft had an altitude of 930 m (3,050 ft). It descended to 670 meters (2,200 ft) in the next 26 seconds, leveled for 16 seconds, then descended to sea level in one minute and 16 seconds. The pilots did not have control over the rate of descent and the next thing remembered by the first officer was seeing the altimeter approaching zero. He attempted to pull up through back pressure and adding power, but the aircraft hit the water before he was able to execute this maneuver. The impact took place at 19:21:30 PST (03:21:30 on January 14 Coordinated Universal Time) in Santa Monica Bay, about 6 nautical miles (11 km; 6.9 mi) west of LAX, in international waters where the sea is 110 meters (360 ft) deep. The crew did not recall any unusual sink rate, buffeting, or yawing, nor were there any instrument warnings except a last-moment flashing of the heading-difference light.

The aircraft hit the water with the tail first. The impact caused the fuselage to break into three main parts. The largest was the 26-meter (85 ft) forward section of the aircraft from the nose to the trailing edge of the wings. It remained afloat after the accident for about twenty hours. The midsection was 13 meters (43 ft) long from the trailing edge of the wing to the rear pressure bulkhead. The aft section consisted of the tail cone including all of the horizontal stabilizers and the vertical stabilizers. The engines and landing gear separated from the aircraft at the time of impact.

== Rescue and salvage ==
Three cabin crew and twelve passengers were killed in the impact. Of these, four were confirmed drowned while eleven were missing and presumed dead. Eleven passengers and the remaining six crew members were injured while thirteen passengers reported no injuries. Thirty people survived the crash. The passengers were distributed throughout the aircraft, although there was a slightly higher proportion of survivors forward than aft. The surviving three cabin crew, an off duty captain and flight attendant, evacuated the passengers onto the wings and into liferafts.

When the first two life rafts were filled, they were tied together and rowed from the port wing toward the nose of the aircraft. One of the rafts scraped against a piece of metal and deflated rapidly with its passengers falling into the water. Other passengers launched a life raft from the starboard wing, but it was also punctured. A search and rescue mission was quickly initiated by the United States Coast Guard. It took between 45 and 60 minutes before the rescue team was able to pick up the survivors. The Coast Guard stayed for hours searching for survivors.

The forward part of the aircraft was towed toward Malibu Beach where it sank. It was later raised and brought to Long Beach Terminal Island Naval Shipyard for investigation. All flight instruments were recovered. The remaining other two sections, along with the engines and landing gear, were not recovered.

== Investigation ==
Because the crash took place in international waters, the investigation was carried out in accordance with the Convention on International Civil Aviation. The Government of Norway requested that the investigation be carried out by the United States' National Transportation Safety Board. The maintenance records were investigated by Norway's Aviation Accident Commission. The final report from the board was issued on July 1, 1970, after 534 days of investigation.

Flight 933 was the 20th hull loss to a DC-8; it was at the time the tenth-deadliest accident of the type and remains the twentieth-deadliest. It was SAS's third fatal crash, but the airline would not experience another until the 2001 Linate Airport runway collision.

All navigational aid systems at LAX were checked and found to be working at the time of the accident. The flight recorder was recovered using a remotely operated underwater vehicle and found to be intact. Flights and simulator tests were carried out by SAS, confirming that the recorded data could be simulated in an appropriate manner on schedule. As the aircraft was found airworthy and able to be flown, the bulk of the work of the investigation commission focused on operational procedures.

== Cause ==
The accident was caused through a series of events which, although not in themselves sufficient to cause the crash, combined to create a breakdown in crew resource management. The flight experienced two delays (de-icing at Seattle–Tacoma and holding at Bakersfield), which along with wind speeds increased the flight time by nearly three hours. This caused the captain to consider diverting to Las Vegas. The first pilot error occurred when the first officer incorrectly set his altimeter when the descent started. The difference between his and the captain's altimeter was never noticed.

Upon receiving clearance, a non-standard terminology was used by air-traffic control. As he did not have authorization to use a localizer back-course approach, the captain should have requested a different approach. Instead, the crew opted to conduct a VOR approach without informing air traffic control. Neither pilot had carried out instrument approach and landing at runway 07R making them less familiar with this than their commonly used Runway 25. Another factor was that the SAS aircraft was forced to operate at the lowest-permissible safe speeds while closing in on the Cessna.

The commission interpreted several of these actions as taking shortcuts to avoid further delays on an already severely delayed flight. They regarded the decision to descend at 5 meters per second (1,000 fpm) as reasonable given the conditions. However, as the first officer focused on the nose gear issue, the aircraft actually experienced a descent of 10.0 meters per second (1,960 fpm) for 26 seconds, zero descent for 16 seconds, and then an average descent of 8.6 meters per second (1,720 fpm) until impact. The first officer was distracted by the captain's dealings with the landing-gear issues, hindering him from primary task: flying the aircraft. The cycling of the landing gear and delay in extending the flaps made speed and altitude control more difficult. The captain also failed to inform the first officer when the flaps were fully extended.

Both the landing-gear issue and the concerns regarding speed made the captain focus on the possibility of a missed approach and the major inconvenience of diverting to Las Vegas. It was the commission's impression that the captain failed to properly monitor the approach, and crew resource management broke down. He failed to give proper instructions to the first officer and failed to carry out instructions from the first officer which moved the first officer's attention away from his task of monitoring the flight instruments. The situation was worsened by the crew attempting to fly at 126 knots (233 km/h; 145 mph) when the aircraft was not configured for that speed. These factors created a situation in which neither pilot was monitoring the altitude. There was also a shortcoming in the approach chart which did not display a minimum altitude at Del Rey Intersection. This would have given the pilots an opportunity to correct the aircraft's altitude.

The commission classified the accident as survivable because the impact forces varied along the fuselage. The tail-first impact was caused by the first officer's last-second attempt at raising the aircraft. Most of the fatalities resulted from people having been trapped in the sinking sections which was caused by the collapsing of the structure after impact. The collapse was caused by the compromise of the tubular integrity which was dependent on the keel beam that had been torn off on impact.

The nose-gear light indicators were designed to be fail safe by having two separate light bulbs. This proved to be inadequate, as it was impossible to look through the cover to check whether one of the bulbs had been compromised, meaning that a failure of one bulb would not be detected until both bulbs malfunctioned. The first bulb was thus presumed to have gone inoperative some time before the day of the flight, while the second bulb broke during Flight 933. The NTSB therefore advised the Federal Aviation Administration to articulate means to avoid similar compromised fail-safe designs in the future. Both pilots had minimum-descent altitude light warnings, which were presumed to have given a visual warning, but because of the work overload, neither pilot directed his attention to these alerts.

The investigation commission produced the following conclusion:

…the probable cause of this accident was the lack of crew coordination and the inadequate monitoring of the aircraft position in space during a critical phase of an instrument landing approach which resulted in an unplanned descent into the water. Contributing to this unplanned descent was an apparent unsafe landing gear condition induced by the design of the landing gear indicator lights and the omission of the minimum crossing altitude at an approach fix depicted on the approach chart.

Two similar accidents occurred in the following decade. Eastern Air Lines Flight 401 was a watershed incident in airline safety: on December 29, 1972, its entire flight crew became preoccupied with a burnt-out landing-gear indicator light and failed to notice that the autopilot had inadvertently been disconnected. As a result, the aircraft gradually lost altitude and eventually crashed. A similar incident occurred on December 28, 1978, when the captain of United Airlines Flight 173 was distracted by a landing-gear issue and did not heed his crewmembers' concerns about the aircraft's fuel level, resulting in an exhaustion of fuel to all engines and a subsequent crash.

== See also ==
- Ansett New Zealand Flight 703
- Eastern Air Lines Flight 401
- United Air Lines Flight 266, a crash which took place not far from where Flight 933 crashed, later the same week

== Bibliography ==
- Hagby, Kay (1998). Fra Nielsen & Winther til Boeing 747 (in Norwegian). Drammen: Hagby.
- Hall, Åke (2002). Luftens Vikingar – en bok om SAS alla flygplan (in Swedish). Nässjö: Air Historic Research. ISBN 91-973892-3-4.
- National Transportation Safety Board (July 1, 1970). "Aircraft Accident Report Scandinavian Airlines System McDonnell Douglas DC-8-62, LN-MOO (Norwegian registry) in Santa Monica Bay near Los Angeles, California January 13, 1969" (PDF). Archived from the original on June 13, 2006. - Copy at Embry-Riddle Aeronautical University
