= United Airlines Flight 2860 =

1977 aviation accident in Utah

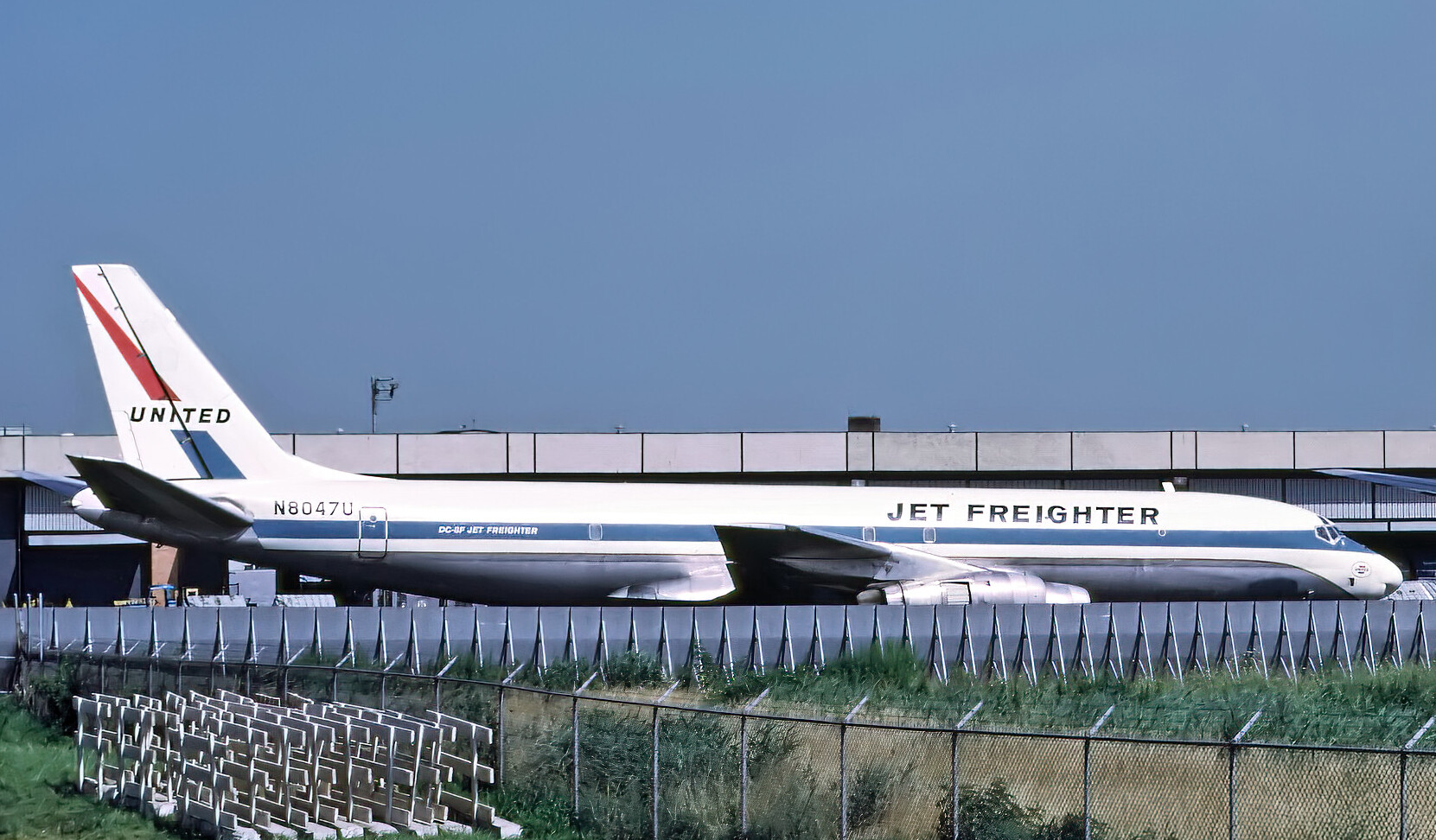
- N8047U, the aircraft involved in the accident, seen in 1973 in a previous livery

Accident
- Date: December 18, 1977
- Summary: Controlled flight into terrain, ATC error, pilot error
- Site: Davis County, Utah, U.S. (near Fruit Heights); 41°02′41″N 111°52′30″W

Aircraft
- Aircraft type: Douglas DC-8F-54
- Operator: United Airlines
- Call sign: UNITED 2860
- Registration: N8047U
- Flight origin: San Francisco International Airport, San Francisco, California, U.S.
- Stopover: Salt Lake City International Airport, Salt Lake City, Utah
- Destination: O'Hare International Airport, Chicago, Illinois
- Occupants: 3
- Passengers: 0
- Crew: 3
- Fatalities: 3
- Survivors: 0

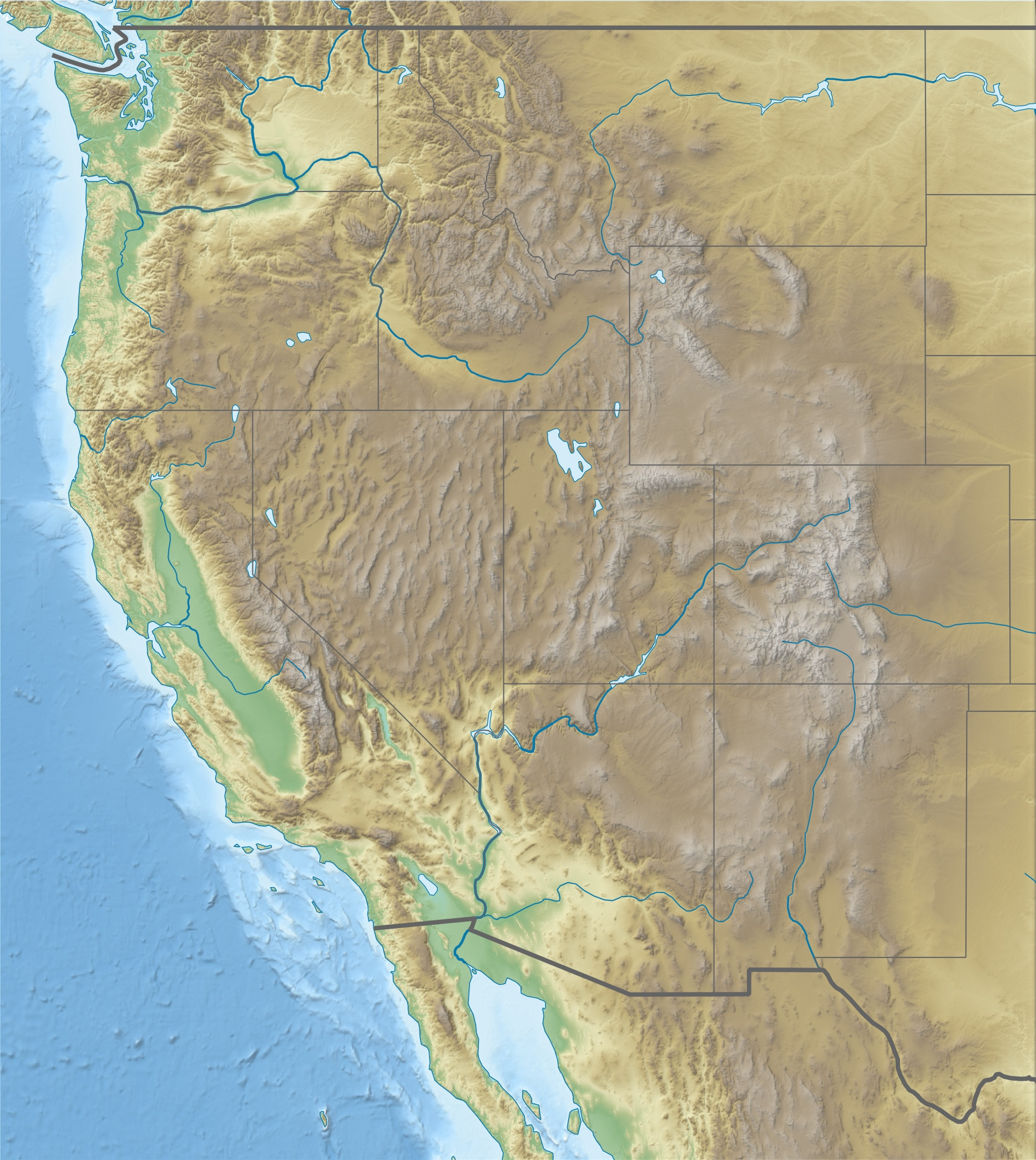
Locations in the western United States

United Airlines Flight 2860 was a scheduled domestic cargo flight in the United States from San Francisco, California, to Chicago, Illinois, with an intermediate stop added at Salt Lake City, Utah. On December 18, 1977, operated by one of the airline's Douglas DC-8 Jet Traders, registration N8047U, the flight was in a holding pattern in Utah and crashed into a mountain in the Wasatch Range near Fruit Heights. All three crew members, the only occupants of the plane, were killed in the accident.

== Summary of events ==
Late on Saturday, December 17, 1977, United Airlines Flight 2860 departed from San Francisco at 23:17 PST (00:17 MST). The three-man crew consisted of Captain John Fender (49), First Officer Phillip Modesitt (46), and Flight Engineer Steve Simpson (34). The intermediate stopover in Salt Lake City had been added several hours earlier. When the flight was near Salt Lake City, less than an hour later at 01:11 MST, the crew radioed the airport that they were having electrical trouble, and requested holding clearance to give them time to communicate with company maintenance. Clearance was approved, and the flight entered a holding pattern.

For the next seven-and-a-half minutes, while in a holding pattern, the flight was absent from the approach control frequency, and entered an area of hazardous terrain. The flight contacted maintenance, and informed they were having electrical trouble, and that several landing gear lights were inoperative. After discussing the problems with maintenance and deciding to contact the tower to get the emergency equipment ready, they re-established contact with the tower in Salt Lake City.

The controller on duty noticed Flight 2860's predicament, but was unable to contact the flight until it re-entered the approach frequency. The controller immediately told Flight 2860 it was close to terrain on its right, and to institute an immediate left turn. Not receiving a response, the controller repeated his instructions, to which Flight 2860 responded. Fifteen seconds later, the same controller told Flight 2860 to climb to 8,000 ft (2,440 m). The flight reported it was climbing to 8,000 from 6,000 ft (1,830 m). Eleven seconds later at 01:38, the flight crashed into a 7,665 ft (2,336 m) mountain ridge at 7,200 ft (2,195 m).

The sheriff's office in Farmington reported the sound of an explosion and subsequent rumbling felt in the ground. The dispatcher called the airport to ask if an airplane had gone missing. The first answer was no. More questions revealed that it was a cargo plane. The sheriff's office organized a rescue team that found the bodies and debris. The rescue team reported that no part of the airplane bigger than a briefcase survived the crash. The "echo" of the crash could be seen on the mountainside for several years afterward.

Witnesses in Kaysville and Fruit Heights saw an airplane flying low overhead. Shortly thereafter, all saw an orange glow to the east, which continued for three to four seconds. All witnesses reported rain in the area, and several reported it as heavy. All three occupants of the flight were killed, and the aircraft was destroyed.

== Cause ==
The National Transportation Safety Board deduced that the cause of the accident was the "controller's issuance and the flight crew's subsequent acceptance of an incomplete and ambiguous holding clearance." The flight crew was cited for their failure to adhere to established lack-of-communication guidelines, and lack of adherence to established holding procedures. The aircraft's electrical problems were cited as a contributing factor. In addition, the flight's cockpit voice recorder was found to be inoperative, preventing the accident investigation from identifying any contributing factors in the cockpit. The crash was one of two United Airlines DC-8 freighter accidents to happen in 6 years.

== See also ==
- Eastern Airlines Flight 401
- Air China Flight 129
- United Airlines Flight 173
- List of unrecovered and unusable flight recorders
