= The President Is Missing =

The President Is Missing may refer to:

- The President Is Missing (novel) (2018)
- The President Is Missing (video game) (1988)

== See also ==
- The President's Plane Is Missing (disambiguation)
