= Trans Caribbean Airways Flight 505 =

1970 aviation accident in the United States Virgin Islands

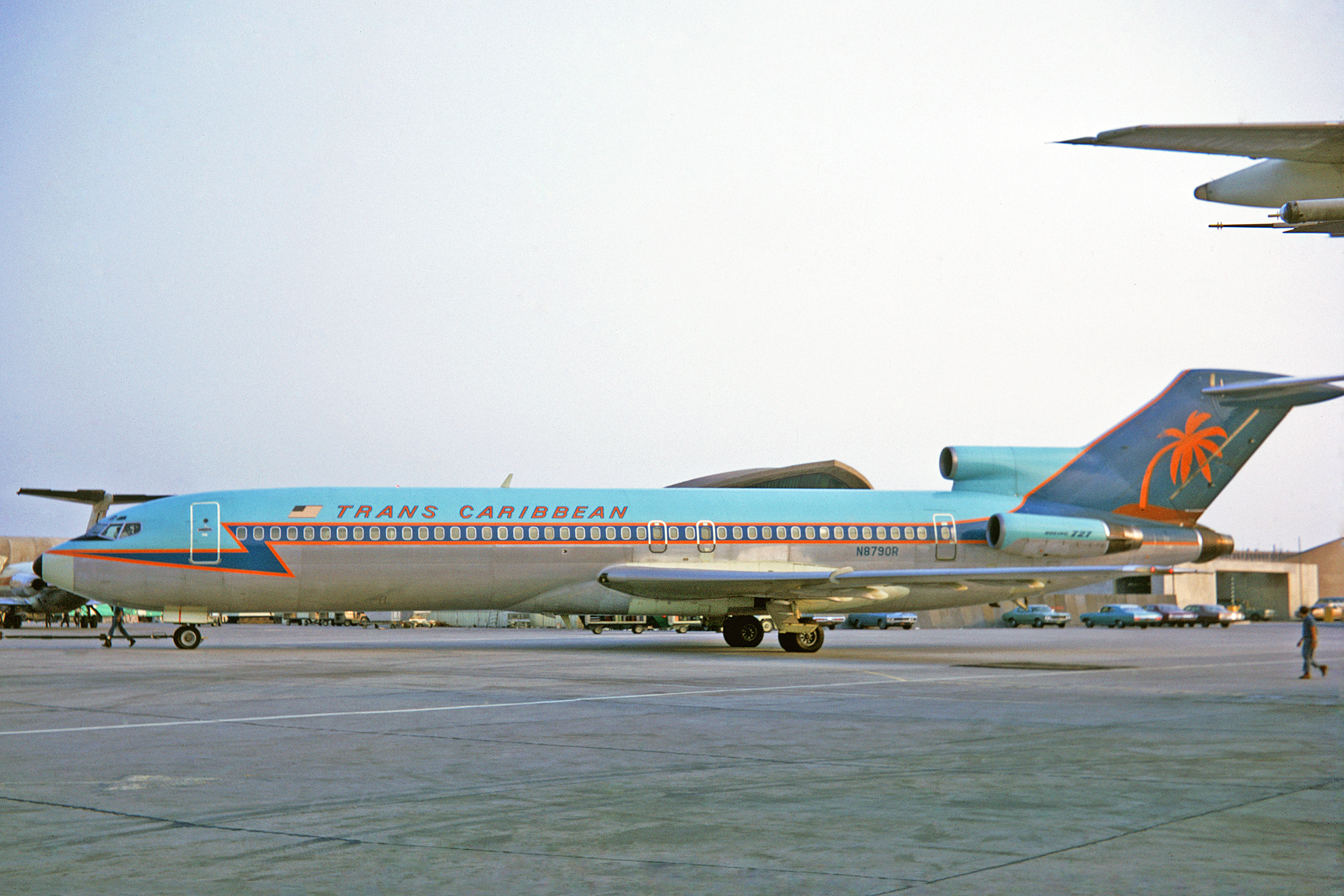
- N8790R, the aircraft involved in the accident, seen in July 1970

Accident
- Date: December 28, 1970
- Summary: Runway overrun: pilot error
- Site: Harry S. Truman Airport, Saint Thomas, United States Virgin Islands; 18°20′N 64°58′W

Aircraft
- Aircraft type: Boeing 727-2A7
- Operator: Trans Caribbean Airways
- IATA flight No.: TR505
- ICAO flight No.: TR505
- Registration: N8790R
- Flight origin: John F. Kennedy International Airport, New York, United States
- Stopover: Isla Verde International Airport, San Juan, Puerto Rico
- Destination: Harry S. Truman Airport, Saint Thomas, United States Virgin Islands
- Occupants: 55
- Passengers: 48
- Crew: 7
- Fatalities: 2
- Injuries: 51
- Survivors: 53

Trans Caribbean Airways Flight 505 was a regularly scheduled domestic flight operating from John F. Kennedy International Airport to Harry S, Truman Airport, with a stopover in Isla Verde International Airport. On December 28, 1970, the aircraft operating the flight, a Boeing 727-2A7, overran runway 09 at Harry S, Truman Airport, killing 2 of the 55 occupants on board and injuring 51 of the 53 survivors.

This is the only fatal crash of an airliner for Trans Caribbean Airways.

== Background ==
=== Aircraft ===
The aircraft involved in the accident was a year old Boeing 727-2A7, registered as N8790R. It had the MSN 20240/717. The aircraft was equipped with three Pratt & Whitney JT8D-9A turbofan engines.

=== Crew ===
The captain was 40 year old Fred Worle. He had 10,665 flight hours, of which, 350 were on the Boeing 727. First officer Raymond Hayes was 45, with 9,471 of his 21,016 flight hours being on the type. Flight engineer Charles Ferrell was 41, and had 17,589 flight hours, with 1,519 being of the 727.

== Accident ==
Flight 505 took off from Isla Verde International Airport in Puerto Rico at 2:27 pm after an uneventful flight from New York's John F. Kennedy International Airport. The flight up until the landing at Harry S. Truman Airport was also routine. The weather conditions at Saint Thomas were windy, but clear. At about 30 feet above the runway, the plane seemed to drop, with the airspeed dropping 5 knots below the reference speed, The aircraft almost immediately bounced to about 50 feet into the air, and the captain extended the speedbrake, causing the aircraft to drop even faster. According to passenger interviews after the second touchdown, "The plane hit so hard it literally shook the stuffings out of the whole plane." The sound of grinding metal, presumably the right main landing gear collapsing, could be heard on the CVR as the aircraft bounced up into the air for the 2nd time. The first officer then made an extreme nose down input, before pulling all the way back on the control column. The captain then called for a go-around, however, the flight engineer was against going around. The flaps were retracted to the 25° as the aircraft struck the runway for the third time. At this time, the CVR stopped recording, with the last thing said being the flight engineer exclaiming, "They're coming up -- but you're not goin' to make it -- you're gonna kill us!" The aircraft also overran the runway, with engine 3 suffering a compressor stall. The remains of the right landing gear and part of the right wingtip then struck a sidewalk, then a truck, which had been evacuated seconds before. The aircraft, still carrying momentum, skidded up a hill, before stopping and catching on fire. Two passengers were killed and 51 of the 53 survivors were injured.

== Investigation ==
An investigation into the crash was quickly launched by the National Transportation Safety Board (NTSB). The investigation lasted one year and one day. A preliminary report into the accident was released on April 9, 1971. The final report into the accident was released on December 29, 1971. The probable cause of the accident was stated by the NTSB to be as follows:

The National Transportation Safety Board determines that the probable cause of this accident was the captain's use of improper techniques in recovering from a high bounce generated by a poorly executed approach and touchdown. Lack of cockpit crew coordination during the approach and attempted recovery contributed to the accident.

== Aftermath ==
After the crash, Trans Caribbean Airways began to struggle financially, which after a year, led to the airline getting acquired by American Airlines on March 1, 1971.

== See also ==
- United Airlines Flight 173
- TAP Flight 425
