= Trans Caribbean Airways =

Small US airline flying to the Caribbean 1945–1971

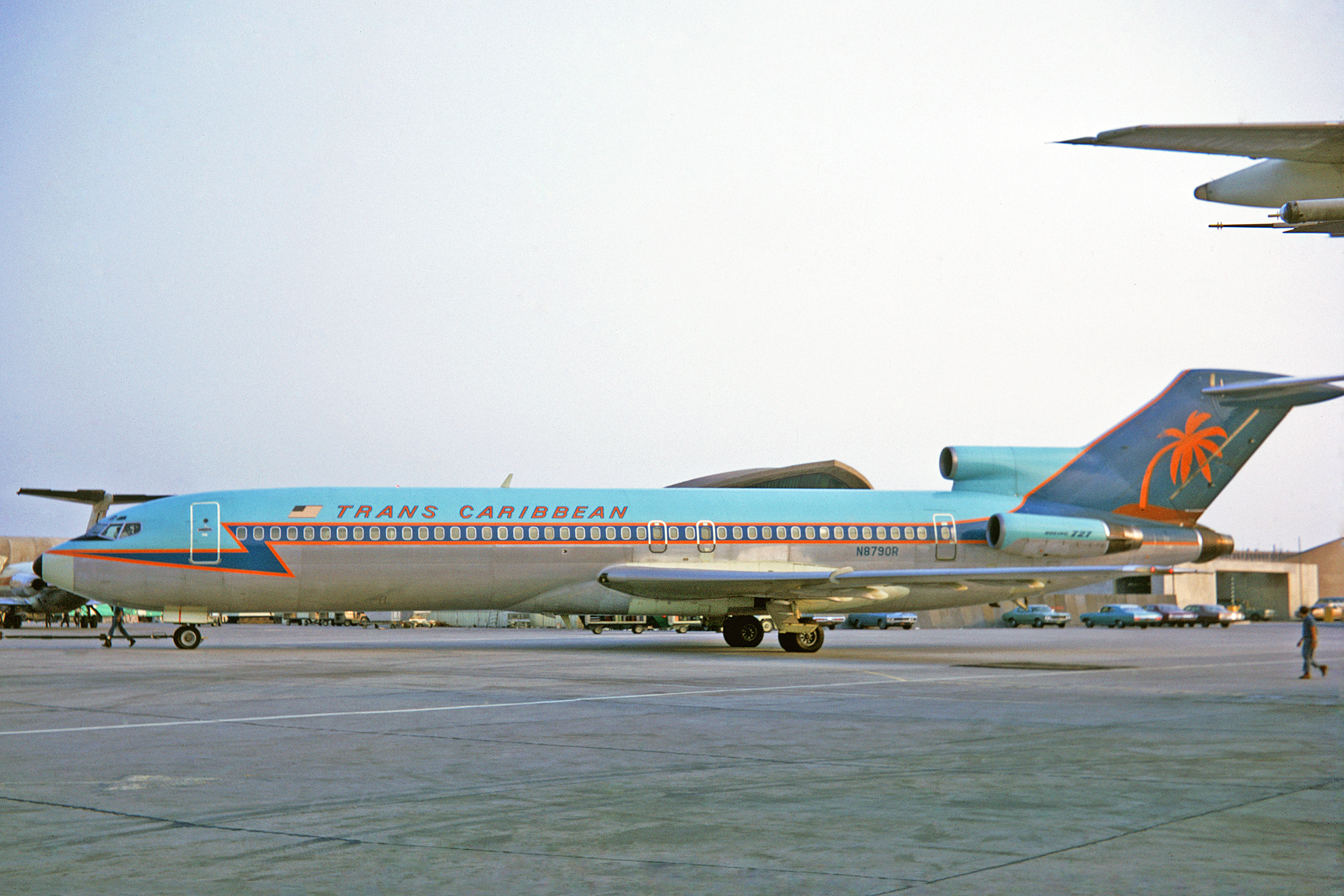
- TCA Boeing 727-200 in 1970
IATA	ICAO	Call sign
TR^{(1)}	TR^{(1)}	—
- Founded: 18 May 1945; 81 years ago (as Trans Caribbean Air Cargo Lines)
- Commenced operations: December 1945; 80 years ago
- Ceased operations: 2 March 1971; 55 years ago (merged into American Airlines)
- Focus cities: New York–JFK; San Juan
- Fleet size: 9
- Destinations: 9
- Headquarters: New York, New York
- Founder: O. Roy Chalk

Notes
- (1) IATA, ICAO codes were the same until the 1980s

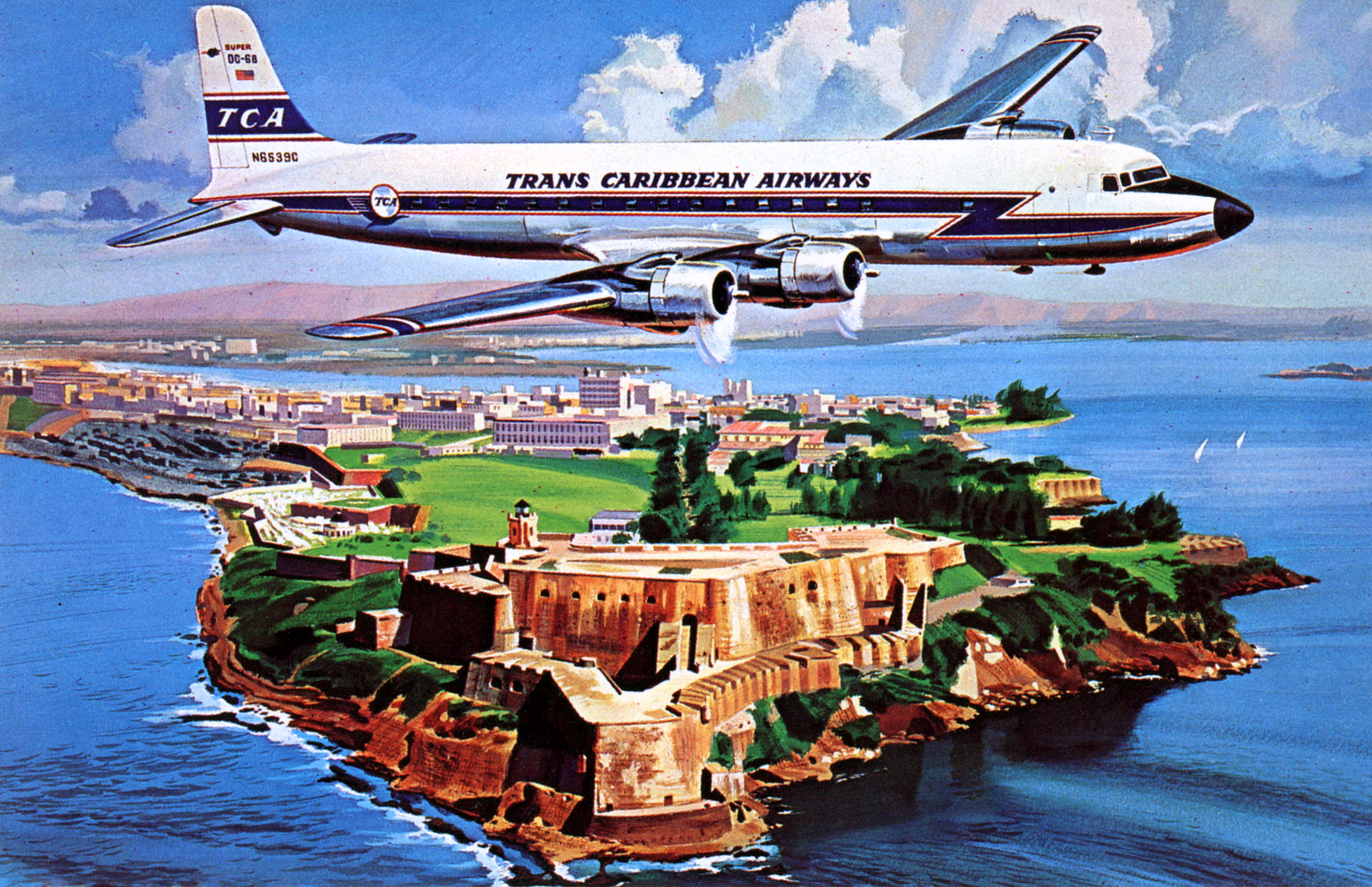
1957 postcard of TCA DC-6B over San Juan

Trans Caribbean Airways (TCA) was an irregular air carrier (United States charter airline) until 1957, when it was certificated by the Civil Aeronautics Board (CAB) as an international air carrier to fly from New York City to San Juan, Puerto Rico. TCA thereafter operated as a small scheduled airline specializing in flying from New York (and later Washington, DC) to the Caribbean, adding a small number of additional routes over time until it was purchased by American Airlines in 1971.

TCA was founded and, for its entire existence controlled, by businessman O. Roy Chalk.

TCA was known for:

- Its unusual final livery of light blue, dark blue and orange
- Being the only irregular (or supplemental air carrier) to achieve scheduled certification during the regulated era of the US airline industry
- Its system being an oasis of low fares among the airlines regulated by the CAB, which otherwise sought to regulate fares to keep them high to support industry profitability. This was noted by advocates of deregulation
- Its routes forming the foundation of the later Caribbean dominance of American Airlines

== Name ==
TCA was originally organized under the name "Trans Caribbean Air Cargo Lines, Inc.", which continued to be its legal name through 1952, when it became "Trans Caribbean Airways, Inc.". However, the name "Trans Caribbean Airways" was in use as early as 1946. In 1959 TCA once again changed its legal name, this time to "Transportation Corporation of America dba Trans Caribbean Airways" until 1964, when it reverted to "Trans Caribbean Airways, Inc.".

== History ==
=== Irregular carrier ===
TCA was organized May 18, 1945, acquired two C-47s in June and started operations in December, initially between Miami, New York, Havana and other Caribbean and Latin American points. TCA acquired Douglas DC-4s in April 1946, with DC-4 operations starting in August. The company went public in April 1946 (99,000 shares at $3/share, or about $4.8mm in gross proceeds in 2024 dollars). TCA did well as an irregular carrier, its CAB application for Puerto Rico service noting a history of profitability and of significant charter service to San Juan. For these reasons, Trans Caribbean was selected over United States Overseas Airlines, a significantly larger supplemental airline of the time. However, the airline also functioned as a vehicle for Roy Chalk's wider ambitions. In 1956, Chalk bought D.C. Transit, the pre-Washington Metro Washington, DC streetcar/bus service, and did so through TCA. In 1959, TCA owned 85% of the stock of D.C. Transit.

At the time of its 1957 CAB scheduled certificate award, TCA's fleet comprised four DC-4s, a DC-6 and two C-46s, with four more DC-6s on order. TCA's certification was the result of a CAB case adding a new carrier to the New York to San Juan route where the CAB atypically sought to add a carrier (to the two carriers already present – Eastern and Pan Am) that would concentrate on low-priced travel. At the time, Puerto Rican migration to the US mainland was a big deal and New York City was the singular focus of this migration, with 70% of all stateside-Puerto Ricans resident in New York City in 1960 (and even higher levels earlier). The CAB saw low fares between New York City and Puerto Rico as essential for the further development of Puerto Rico and to allow Puerto Rican migrants to the mainland US to easily visit their homeland and with that in mind, certified TCA for an initial period of five years on New York, NY/Newark, NJ-San Juan. The Puerto Rico case therefore was remarkable in having as its results (i) that a supplemental air carrier achieved the status of being a certificated carrier (the only time this ever happened) and (ii) where the CAB explicitly sought to reduce fares.

=== Certificated success ===
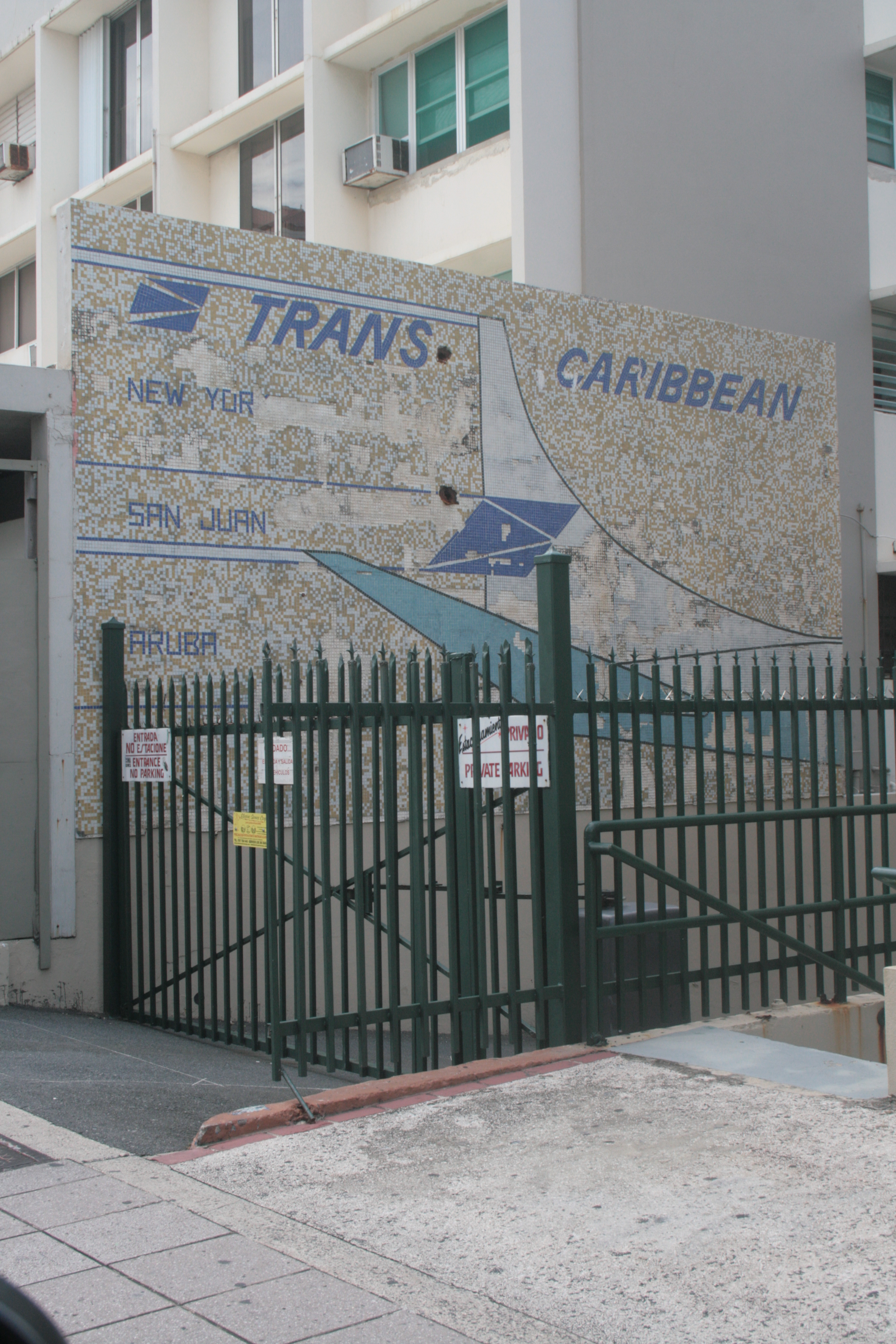
May 2012 picture of now-destroyed mosaic at former TCA ticket office at 1022 Ashford Ave, San Juan

TCA was initially successful as a certificated carrier, starting San Juan (SJU, the airport then known as Isla Verde, today's Luis Muñoz Marín International Airport) scheduled service from then Idlewild Airport, today's New York JFK Airport (JFK) in New York in March 1958. In 1960, the CAB gave it approval to extend the San Juan flight to Aruba (AUA). In December 1961 it introduced jet service to San Juan with DC-8-50s. It was also successful in suppressing fares – in 1960, Pan Am and Eastern complained of losing $1.7mm and $1mm respectively on New York-San Juan, a year in which TCA broke even on the route. Chalk did not lack for ambition: in 1961 alone he had TCA bid for Northeast Airlines and asked the CAB to serve New York to a number of Midwest cities.

The CAB did not formally review TCA's certification until September 1966, when it granted TCA permanent authority, viewing it as having made a success of the route. TCA's typical market share of New York-San Juan was about 25%, though lower in 1966 because it was left short of life after Eastern torched a TCA DC-8 while performing heavy maintenance on it in Miami in November 1965. New York-San Juan expanded from being the 11th largest domestic route to the 6th largest by passengers. 1965 passengers on the route were over 2.5 times those of 1955, far above the increase in overall domestic traffic in the same period. This was driven by a dramatic shift in passengers traveling on "thrift" fares, an early form of discount air fare, not generally available elsewhere. In 1958, substantially fewer than 50% of passengers used such fares on New York-San Juan, but by the last 12 months of data available to the CAB at the time (YE Sep 30 1964), almost 92% of all passengers (and 98% of TCA passengers) were using such fares, an early look at the stimulative effect of low-fares in a longer-haul scheduled market (as opposed to the short-haul markets of Pacific Southwest Airlines in California in the same timeframe or Southwest Airlines in Texas in the 1970s). This was well before Laker Airways' Skytrain in 1977. Fares were as low as $45 (over $450 in 2024 dollars) and the CAB noted the route had some of the lowest yields (revenue per passenger per mile) in the world. Yet TCA continued to make money.

TCA's fleet at the time comprised three 177-seat DC-8-50s, plus a fourth aircraft leased from another airline one a per-trip basis. Three "stretched-out" (as the CAB put it) DC-8-61 series aircraft were due for delivery in 1967.

DC-8-54F New York 1970

=== Falling into the arms of American ===
The last four years of TCA were marked by ill-advised expansion. In May 1967, the CAB gave TCA authority to fly from Dulles International Airport (IAD) outside Washington, DC. Specifically IAD, which was unfortunate because IAD was deserted, in the early years of being a notorious white elephant. In the 12 months ending June 30, 1967, IAD had enplanements (i.e. about half the total passengers) of 585,000, against 4.12mm at Washington National Airport (DCA) and 1.08mm at Baltimore Friendship Airport (BWI). IAD annual passenger numbers did not exceed 3mm until 1984, six years into US airline deregulation. Northern Virginia was mostly empty relative to today and IAD was further hamstrung by the mobile lounge concept. In 1968, TCA got permanent authority (from IAD and JFK/EWR) for Aruba (AUA), along with Curacao (CUR), the US Virgin Islands (St Thomas (STT) and St Croix (STX)) and Port au Prince (PAP), Haiti. This authority was subject to restrictions; e.g., PAP could not be served from SJU, STX or STT. In that respect, SJU was not a hub for TCA's Caribbean destinations.

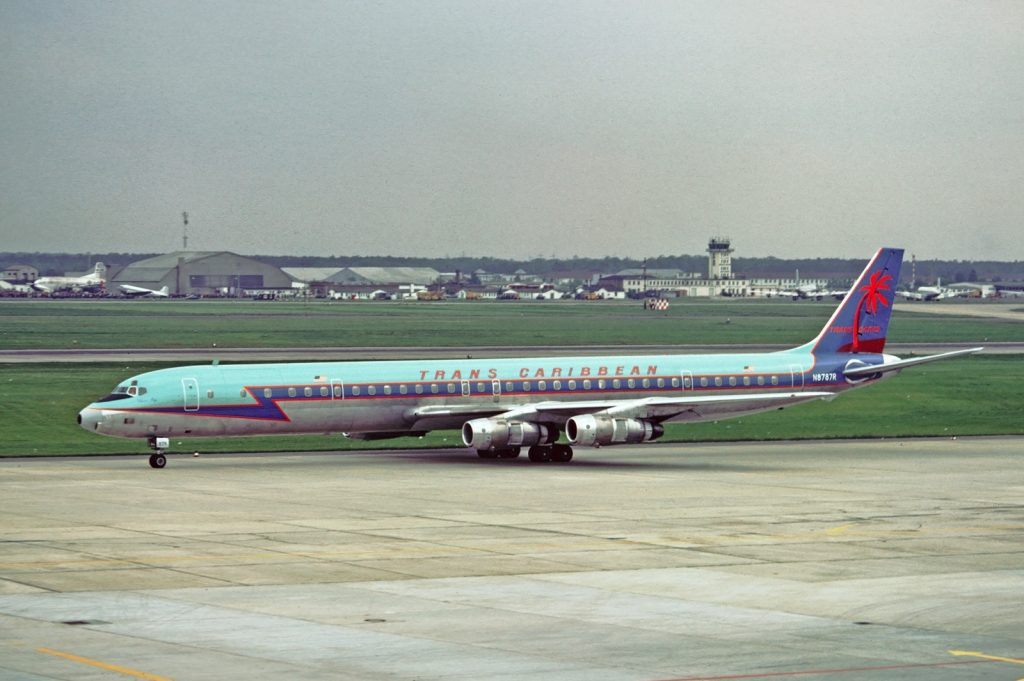
TCA DC-8-61CF in 1970

TCA's results suffered. It was a broader issue than just the new cities: average revenue per scheduled customer declined 4.5% from 1965 to 1966 which happened prior to any new city. But TCA started with near daily service at IAD, cut that in half, and then reduced it to a single weekly operation. Frequencies on routes other than JFK-SJU were also minimal – TCA had little marketing identity outside of New York City and minimal connecting traffic from the rest of the US to its Caribbean flights. The strong community of interest between New York City and Puerto Rico supported JFK-SJU flights, but there was nothing similar for other routes. TCA lost increasing amounts of money from 1966 onward, with a huge $11.1mm loss in 1969 (over $94mm in 2024 dollars) on transport revenues of $46mm. In August 1969, O. Roy Chalk asked American Airlines to buy TCA. He wanted $55mm, American passed, but on January 2, 1970, spurred on by a very poor fourth quarter, Chalk suggested $25mm. American offered $18mm and the deal was approved by both boards by January 21. American lent money to TCA to tide it through 1970 while the regulatory process played out. CAB's merger approval noted TCA could not survive on its own and that TCA's route network would work far better backed by American's large domestic system and its marketing muscle.

O. Roy Chalk had a lot on his plate. D.C. Transit was in growing financial trouble with Chalk accused on the floor of the US Senate (among other places) of having milked it (the bus lines would be forcibly purchased by the new Washington Metro in 1973). D.C. Transit shares were dividended to TCA shareholders in 1968, but the American merger was complicated by the need for TCA to dispose of further non-airline subsidiaries (to which TCA had advanced over $7mm net in working capital): a newspaper, radio and TV stations and real estate, plus a substantial potential tax liability from past D.C. Transit ownership. For this reason, a portion of American's purchase price was placed in escrow when the deal closed to be released only if these issues were favorably solved. President Richard Nixon gave required consent by year end 1970. The deal was slated to close in time for American to operate the flights on March 2, 1971. A last minute hitch pushed it back to March 8, but the CAB transferred route authority to American on March 2 as scheduled. Robert J. Serling's book on American Airlines portrays O. Roy Chalk in a dubious light, discussing him of having falsified merger-related information.

TCA's final fleet comprised three DC-8-50 series, three DC-8-61 series and three Boeing 727 aircraft. The B-727s were necessary to fly into airports like St Thomas, which at the time had a very short runway.

== Service characteristics ==
Even as a scheduled carrier, TCA continued to have a strong charter business, particularly military charters, with charter revenue being comparable to scheduled in many years. This allowed the airline to flex up schedules when demand warranted. For instance, in December 1965, TCA flew 5/day JFK-SJU (six on Friday), including redeyes and a 12:15am departure, but over the winter holiday TCA flew 10 flights/day on JFK-SJU. TCA's final home at JFK was National Airlines's Sundrome. TCA had day-of-week and black-out pricing: timetables show that its lowest fares were available on during the week, in the middle of the night and not available during holiday periods.

== Legacy ==
American's purchase of TCA was seen as a significant change for the airline, American having no prior presence in the Caribbean and viewed as a business airline. From an operating standpoint, the merger went well: American's 1972 annual report said TCA's system was profitable, despite a 43% increase in capacity, due to an increase in load factor from 53% to 63%. In late 1973 (approved 1975), American followed up by trading its South Pacific routes to Pan Am in exchange for two Pan Am's Caribbean routes (Santo Domingo in the Dominican Republic and Barbados) plus Bermuda. Pan Am had the same issue as TCA, no network within the lower 48 to feed such flights. The Pan Am and TCA routes laid the foundation for continued Caribbean growth by American, culminating in the 1986 establishment of a San Juan hub. After Eastern collapsed in 1989-1991, American became dominant in the Caribbean. But American ultimately found it hard to compete against growing nonstop service to Caribbean islands (versus connecting in San Juan). American's San Juan hub was picked apart from 2007 through 2014. And in 2017, American finally threw in the towel on the New York to San Juan route it inherited from TCA. American remains present in San Juan, but only with flights from its hubs.

== Destinations ==
TCA system timetable dated July 7, 1969 shows service to the following destinations:

- Aruba (AUA)
- Curacao (CUR)
- Newark, New Jersey (EWR)
- New York City
- Port Au Prince, Haiti (PAP)
- St. Croix (STX)
- Saint Thomas (STT)
- San Juan (SJU) - focus city
- Washington, DC (IAD)

== Fleet ==
=== Final fleet ===
The Civil Aeronautics Board (CAB) was the US Federal agency that approved Trans Caribbean's merger with American. According to the CAB's report approving the merger, Trans Caribbean's fleet comprised nine aircraft, as follows:

- 3 DC-8-61
- 3 DC-8-54
- 1 727-100
- 2 727-200

=== Retired fleet ===
Trans Caribbean Airways previously operated the following aircraft:

Trans Caribbean Airways retired fleet
Aircraft	Total	Introduced	Retired	Notes
Boeing 707-320C	1	1967	1968	Leased from Aer Lingus.
Boeing 720	1	1967	1968	Leased from Aer Lingus.
Curtiss C-46 Commando	2	1948	1956	
Douglas C-47 Skytrain	2	1945	Unknown	
Douglas C-54 Skymaster	7	1946	1962	
Douglas DC-6	2	1955	1957	
Douglas DC-6B	2	1960	1964	
Douglas DC-8-51	2	1961	1964	

== Accidents and incidents ==
- On November 26, 1965, a TCA Douglas DC-8-50, registration N8784R, was destroyed by fire in the early hours of the morning while undergoing heavy maintenance at an Eastern Air Lines hangar in Miami International Airport (MIA). Three Eastern employees suffered burns, one of whom died several weeks later of his injuries.
- On December 28, 1970, Trans Caribbean Airways Flight 505, a Boeing 727-200 (registered N8790R), made a hard landing and ran off the side of the runway of what was then known as Harry S. Truman Airport in St. Thomas, Virgin Islands, today known as Cyril E. King Airport. Two of the 48 passengers on board died in a subsequent fire, and the aircraft was destroyed by the ensuing conflagration.

== See also ==
- List of defunct airlines of the United States
