= The President's Plane Is Missing (film) =

- VHS box cover art
- Genre: Drama
- Based on: The novel of the same name by Robert J. Serling
- Screenplay by: Ernest Kinoy; Mark Carliner
- Directed by: Daryl Duke
- Starring: Buddy Ebsen; Peter Graves; Arthur Kennedy; Raymond Massey; Mercedes McCambridge; Rip Torn
- Music by: Gil Melle
- Country of origin: United States
- Original language: English

Production
- Producer: Mark Carliner
- Cinematography: Richard C. Glouner
- Editor: John F. Link
- Running time: 100 minutes
- Production company: ABC Circle Films

Original release
- Network: ABC
- Release: October 23, 1973

The President's Plane Is Missing is a 1973 American TV movie directed by Daryl Duke with a screenplay by Ernest Kinoy and Mark Carliner based upon the Robert J. Serling 1967 novel of the same name. It aired on the ABC Movie of the Week.

== Plot ==
With diplomatic tensions building and the United States facing a possible military confrontation with China, Air Force One mysteriously crashes in the desert while heading to California, with President Jeremy Haines on board. While the crash is being investigated and with the president's fate yet uncertain, Vice President Kermit Madigan becomes acting president. Unfortunately, Haines had left him uninformed of current foreign policies. Madigan must now rely on Haines' cabinet and aides to fill him in on information he lacks, while the aides attempt to further their own agendas.

National Security Advisor George Oldenburg claims that Haines was preparing to go to war if the Chinese did not back down, while Secretary of State Freeman Sharkey asserts that Haines was pursuing a peaceful solution to the problem with China. Madigan's wife, Hester, sees this as an opportunity to advance his career, but the Washington political community doubts his competence. In dealing with growing tensions and conflicting advice, Madigan struggles to avoid a nuclear war with China. Meanwhile, it turns out that President Haines was not aboard the crashed plane after all.

== Cast ==
- Buddy Ebsen as Vice President Kermit Madigan
- Peter Graves as Mark Jones
- Arthur Kennedy as Gunther Damon
- Raymond Massey as Secretary of State Freeman Sharkey
- Mercedes McCambridge as Second Lady Hester Madigan
- Rip Torn as National Security Advisor George Oldenburg
- Louise Sorel as Joanna Spencer
- Dabney Coleman as Senator Bert Haines
- Joseph Campanella as Colonel Doug Henderson
- Richard Eastham as General Colton
- Byron Morrow as Admiral Phillips
- Bill Walker as Thomas
- Richard Bull as First Controller
- Richard Stahl as Dentist
- Gil Peterson as Tower Controller
- Barry Cahill as Ground Crew Chief
- Lillian Lehman as Genesse
- James Sikking as Aide to Dunbar
- Barbara Leigh as WAF
- George Barrows as Mr. Meyers
- John Amos as Marine Corporal
- John Ward as Major D'Andrea
- Tod Andrews as President Jeremy Haines
- James Wainwright as General Ben Dunbar
- James B. Smith as Major Earl Foster

== Novel ==
Robert J. Serling's 1967 novel spent multiple weeks on The New York Times Bestseller List and its success enabled Serling to become a full-time writer. Serling later penned a sequel to the novel entitled Air Force One Is Haunted, which centered around the ghost of President Franklin Roosevelt haunting the incumbent president whenever he boards Air Force One.

== Production ==
The President's Plane Is Missing was completed for release in 1971, but due to then-President Richard Nixon's ongoing diplomatic relationship with and planned visit to China it was decided to postpone release of a film which painted China in a negative light until after Nixon's return from his visit to China.

The President's Plane Is Missing was released on October 23, 1973, as a period piece.

== Reception ==
In Cinema and Nation, when comparing The President's Plane Is Missing to such films as JFK (1991) and The Manchurian Candidate (1962), reviewers noted that while many films use a premise that actual democracy is an illusion, this one was rare in that it turned the president into an action hero. In 1988, the reviewer for the Sydney Morning Herald wrote that it was a "dull film despite an excellent cast."
