= Santa Monica Bay =

Bight in the Pacific Ocean

Coordinates: 33°56′20″N 118°30′15″W

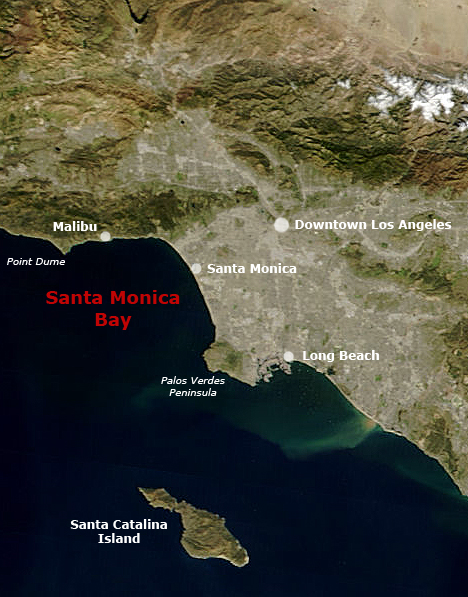
Santa Monica Bay

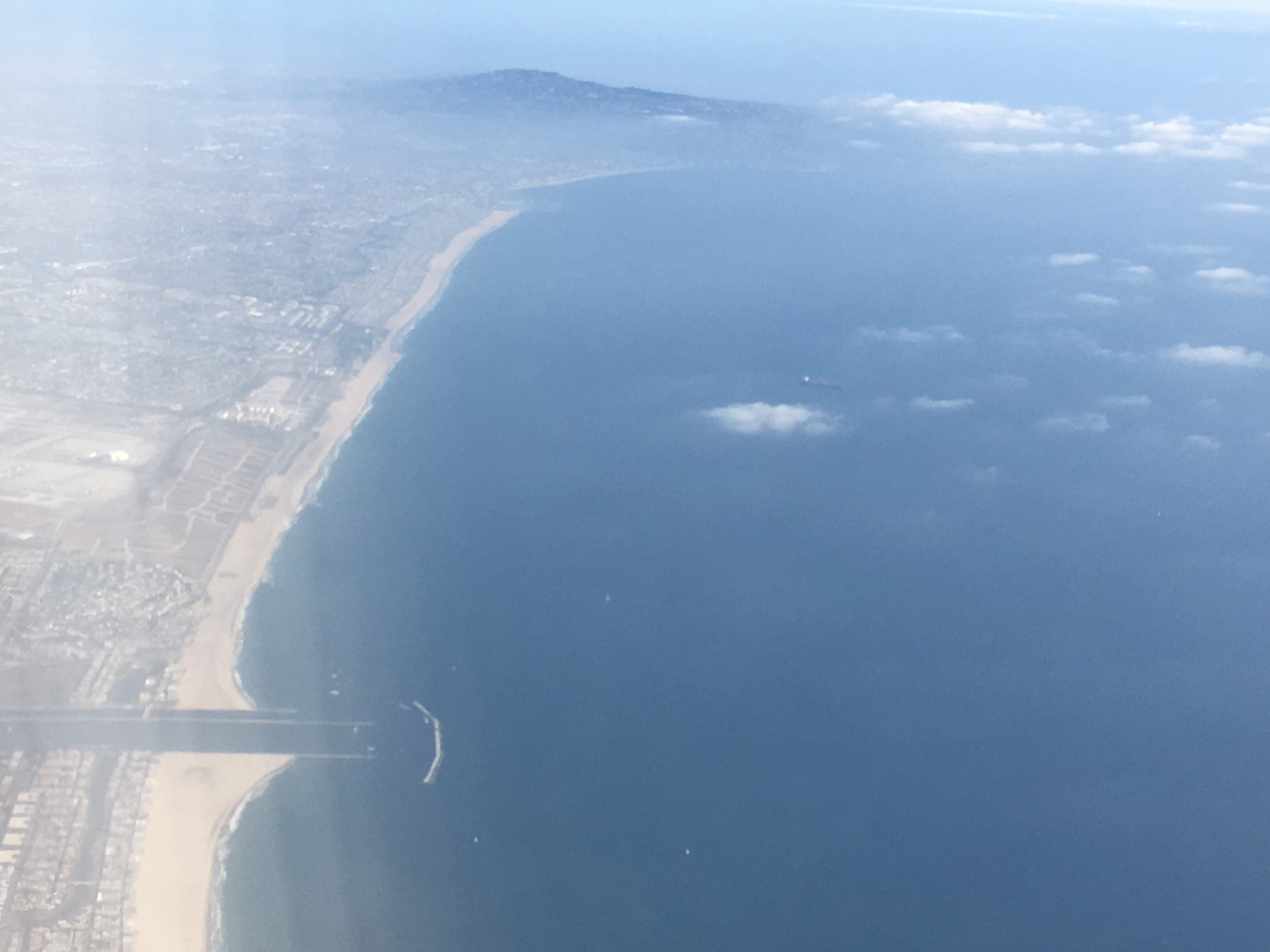
Santa Monica Bay, aerial view

Santa Monica Bay is a bight of the Pacific Ocean in Southern California, United States. Its boundaries are slightly ambiguous, but it is generally considered to be the part of the Pacific within an imaginary line drawn between Point Dume, in Malibu, and the Palos Verdes Peninsula. Its eastern shore forms the western boundary of the Los Angeles Westside and South Bay regions. Although it was fed by the Los Angeles River until the river's catastrophic change of course in 1825, the only stream of any size now flowing into it is Ballona Creek. Smaller waterways draining into the bay include Malibu Creek, Topanga Creek, and Santa Monica Creek.

The Santa Monica Bay is home to some of the most famous beaches in the world, including Malibu Lagoon State Beach (Surfrider), Will Rogers State Beach, Santa Monica State Beach, and Dockweiler State Beach.

Several piers extend into the bay, including Malibu Pier, Santa Monica Pier, Venice Pier, Manhattan Beach Pier, Hermosa Beach Pier, and the Redondo Beach pier. Marina Del Rey is a dredged marina. The bay is a very popular fishing destination year-round.

== History ==
In the 1930s, gambling ships anchored beyond the regulated three-mile limit, then kept measured from the beach. The ships were popular, and a fleet of ever-larger ships and barges appeared until the State Attorney General recalculated the limit to exclude the bay. The largest ship held the state police off for nine days with submachine guns in what the newspapers called The Battle of Santa Monica Bay.

Once a major commercial fishery, Santa Monica Bay's water quality declined drastically in the 20th century as development of Los Angeles County resulted in large amounts of sewage and trash-rich storm runoff being dumped into its waters. Through restoration projects mandated by the Clean Water Act and advocated by groups such as Heal the Bay and the Surfrider Foundation, the bay's water quality has improved fairly dramatically from its early-1980s nadir. Hyperion sewage treatment plant's output is now far cleaner than before. However, during the region's rainy winters, the bay suffers from algal bloom and other water pollution-related maladies, periodically forcing most of the famous beaches along its shore to close.

On January 13, 1969, Scandinavian Airlines System Flight 933 crashed into the bay while on approach to Los Angeles International Airport, killing 15 of the 45 people on board. Five days later on January 18, United Airlines Flight 266 crashed into the bay after takeoff from the same airport, killing all 38 people on board.

In 1990, actor Wallace Reid Jr. was killed when his homebuilt plane crashed in the bay amid heavy fog.

In 2006, game show host Peter Tomarken and his wife Kathleen were killed in a plane crash into the bay. They were heading to San Diego to pick up a cancer patient who needed transportation to UCLA Medical Center for treatment when their airplane crashed.

Since 2022, The Ocean Cleanup has been operating a cleanup system in Ballona Creek to prevent plastic and other solid waste from leaking into the bay.

== Communities and settlements ==
- El Porto
- El Segundo
- Hermosa Beach
- Malibu
- Manhattan Beach and Bruce's Beach
- Marina del Rey
- Pacific Palisades
- Palos Verdes Estates
- Playa del Rey
- Rancho Palos Verdes
- Redondo Beach
- Santa Monica
- Torrance
- Venice
