= United Air Lines Flight 266 =

1969 aviation accident

United Airlines Flight 266
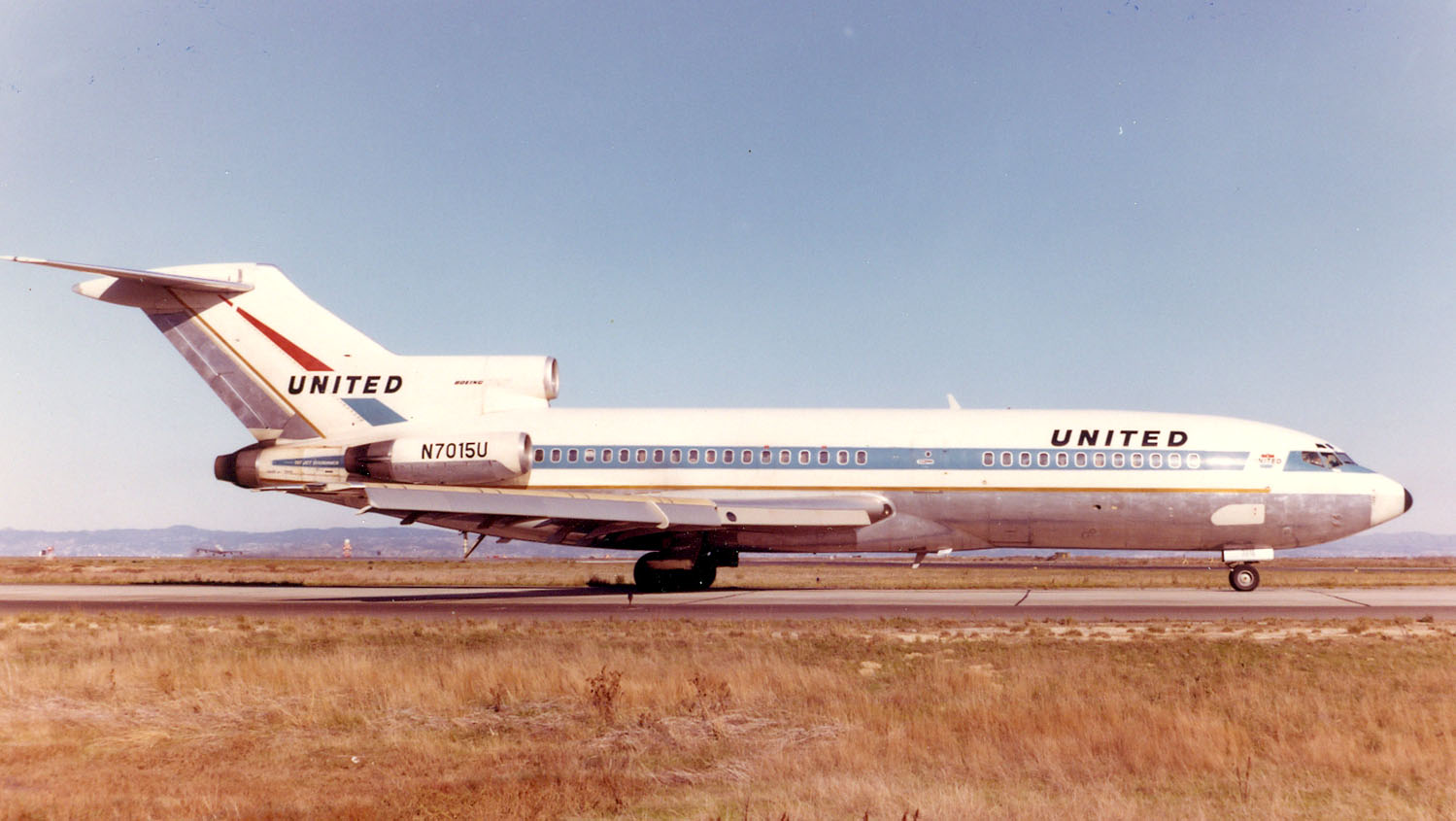
- A United Airlines Boeing 727 similar to the accident aircraft

Accident
- Date: January 18, 1969
- Summary: Total loss of electrical power for undetermined reasons, resulting in spatial disorientation and loss of control
- Site: Santa Monica Bay, California, United States; 33°56′56″N 118°39′30″W

Aircraft
- Aircraft type: Boeing 727-22C
- Operator: United Airlines
- Call sign: UNITED 266
- Registration: N7434U
- Flight origin: Los Angeles International Airport, Los Angeles, California
- Stopover: Stapleton International Airport, Denver, Colorado
- Destination: General Mitchell International Airport, Milwaukee, Wisconsin
- Occupants: 38
- Passengers: 32
- Crew: 6
- Fatalities: 38
- Survivors: 0

United Airlines Flight 266 was a scheduled passenger flight from Los Angeles International Airport, California, to General Mitchell International Airport, Milwaukee, Wisconsin, via Stapleton International Airport, Denver, Colorado. On January 18, 1969, at approximately 18:21 PST, the Boeing 727 operating the flight crashed into Santa Monica Bay, Pacific Ocean, about 11.5 miles (18.5 km) west of Los Angeles International Airport, four minutes after takeoff, killing all 38 on board.

== Aircraft and crew ==
The Boeing 727-22C aircraft, registration N7434U, was almost new and had been delivered to United Airlines only four months earlier. It had less than 1,100 hours of operating time.

The crew of Flight 266 was Captain Leonard Leverson, 49, a veteran pilot who had been with United Airlines for 22 years and had almost 13,700 flying hours to his credit. His first officer was Walter Schlemmer, 33, who had approximately 7,500 hours, the flight engineer was Keith Ostrander, 29, who had 634 hours. Between them the crew had more than 4,300 hours of flight time on the Boeing 727.

== Accident ==
The aircraft had a nonfunctional #3 generator for several days leading up to the accident. Per standard procedure, the crew placed masking tape over the switches and warning lights for the generator.

Approximately two minutes after takeoff, the crew reported a fire warning on engine #1 and shut it down. The crew radioed to departure control that they only had one functioning generator and needed to return to the airport, but it turned out to be their last communication, with subsequent attempts to contact Flight 266 proving unsuccessful. Shortly after engine #1 shut down, the #2 generator also ceased operating for reasons unknown.

With the loss of all power to the lights and flight attitude instruments, flying at night in instrument conditions, the pilots quickly became spatially disoriented and unable to know which inputs to the flight controls were necessary to keep the plane flying normally. Consequently, the crew lost control of the aircraft and crashed into the ocean at a steep nose-down angle, killing everyone on board.

Rescuers (at the time) speculated that an explosion occurred aboard the plane. Three and a half hours after the crash three bodies had been found in the ocean along with parts of fuselage and a United States mail bag carrying letters with that day's postmark. Hope was dim for survivors because the aircraft was configured for domestic flights and did not carry liferafts or lifejackets. A Coast Guard spokesman said it looked "very doubtful that there could be anybody alive."

Transcript of United Airlines Flight 266's CVR (Times are expressed in PST)
* = Unintelligible word; () = Questionable text; (()) = Commentary; — = Break in continuity; Shading = Radio communication
smallpx
| Time | Source | Content |
| 18:16:58 | LAX tower (to UA266) | United Two-sixty-six cleared for takeoff |
| 18:17:00 | UA266 (to LAX tower) | United Two-sixty-six rolling |
| 18:17:02 | Captain | Last Three items |
| 18:17:05 | Flight Engineer | Engine start switches? |
| 18:17:06 | First officer | Three on |
| 18:17:07 | Flight Engineer | Anti Skid? |
| 18:17:10 | First officer | On |
| 18:17:11 | Unknown | (yeah, that's good) |
| 18:17:11 | Unknown | Oil cooler (comin) ground off, (You kicked off Dick) |
| 18:17:14 | First officer | They're stabilized |
| 18:17:20 | Captain | Take off trust |
| 18:17:22 | First officer | Set, looks good |
| 18:17:37 | First officer | One hundred |
| 18:17:39 | First officer | one-ten |
| 18:17:42 | First officer | one-twenty |
| 18:17:43 | First officer | VR |
| 18:17:51 | First officer | Vee 2 |
| 18:17:52 | Captain | Gear up |
| 18:17:53 | First officer | Gear up |
| 18:17:55 | LAX tower (to UA266) | United Two-sixty-six contact departure |
| 18:17:59 | First Officer (to LAX tower) | Changing |
| 18:18:09 | Captain | (You handle these things) lights on the controls |
| 18:18:09 | First officer | Yeah |
| 18:18:09 | Captain | Flaps-ah five |
| 18:18:09 | First officer | Five |
| 18:18:13 | LAX Departure (to UA266) | United Two-sixty-six Los Angeles Departure control radar contact, turn right heading two-seven-zero report leaving Three thousand |
| 18:18:21 | First Officer (to LAX Departure) | Two-seven-zero, wilco |
| 18:18:26 | Captain | You have a green two |
| 18:18:28 | First officer | Two? |
| 18:18:30 | ((Fire warning bell)) | |
| 18:18:31 | First officer | Fuck |
| 18:18:32 | Captain | What the hell was that? |
| 18:18:34 | First officer | Number one fire warning, Arn |
| 18:18:36 | Captain | Ok, let's take care of the...... warning |
| 18:18:40 | First officer | Pull it back for you? |
| 18:18:42 | Captain | Yeah, pull it back |
| 18:18:42 | First officer | Ok |
| 18:18:44 | ((Warning horn)) | |
| 18:18:45 | First officer | That put us on one fucking generator too |
| 18:18:45 | Captain | Huh? |
| 18:18:45 | First officer | That'll put us on one generator |
| 18:18:50 | Captain | Yeah, watch that electrical loading |
| 18:18:52 | First officer | Everything off? |
| 18:18:58 | First Officer (to LAX Departure) | Ah, Departure United two-sixty-six |
| 18:19:04 | LAX Departure (to UA266) | United two-sixty-six go ahead. |
| 18:19:05 | First Officer (to LAX Departure) | We've had a fire warning on number one engine, we shut down we'd like to come back |
| 18:19:10 | LAX Departure (to UA266) | United two-sixty-six Roger what is your present altitude? |
| 18:19:13 | ((CVR cuts out)) | |
| 00:00:00 | ((CVR resumes, at an indeterminate time later)) | |
| 00:00:00.5 | Unknown | Fields out |
| 00:00:02 | Flight Engineer | We're gonna get screwed up |
| 00:00:04 | Flight Engineer | Fuck, I don't know (What's going on) |
| 00:00:06 | First officer | Keep it going up Arnie you're a thousand feet |
| 00:00:08 | First officer | Pull it up! |
((End of recording))

== Investigation ==
The National Transportation Safety Board (NTSB) was unable to determine why the #2 generator had failed after it had become the plane's sole power source, nor why the "standby electrical system either was not activated or failed to function."

Several witnesses saw Flight 266 take off and reported seeing sparks emanating from either engine #1 or the rear of the fuselage, while others claimed an engine was on fire. Salvage operations were conducted to recover the wreckage of the aircraft, but not much useful information was gleaned as the cockpit instruments were not recovered. The wreckage was in approximately 930 feet (280 m) of water and had been severely fragmented, however the relatively small area in which it was spread indicated an extremely steep, nose-down angle at impact. There was little in the way of identifiable human remains at the wreckage site, only two passengers were identified and only one intact body was found. The #2 and #3 engines suffered severe rotational damage from high RPM speeds at impact, but the #1 engine had almost no damage because it had been powered off. No evidence of any fire or heat damage was found on the engines, thus disproving the witnesses' claims. The small portion of the electrical system that was recovered did not provide any relevant information. The Cockpit Voice Recorder took nearly six weeks to locate and recover. NTSB investigators could not explain the sparking seen by witnesses on the ground and theorized that it might have been caused by debris being sucked into the engine, a transient compressor stall or an electrical system problem that led to the eventual power failure. They also were unable to explain the engine #1 fire warning in the absence of a fire, but this may have resulted from electrical system problems or a cracked duct that allowed hot engine air to trigger the temperature sensors. The sensors from the #1 and #2 engines were recovered and exhibited no signs of malfunction. Some tests indicated that it was indeed possible for the #2 generator to fail from an overload condition as a result of the operating load shifting to it following the #1 generator's shutdown, this was maintained as a possible cause of the failure.

N7434U had recently been fitted with a generator control panel that had been passed around several different UAL aircraft because of several malfunctions. After being installed in N7434U the month prior to the ill-fated flight, generator #3 once again caused operating problems and was swapped with a different unit. Since that generator was subsequently tested and found to have no mechanical issues, the control panel was identified as the problem after it caused further malfunctions with the replacement generator. Busy operating schedules and limited aircraft availability meant repair work on N7434U was put on hold, the #3 generator was disabled. The NTSB investigators believed that the inoperative #3 generator probably was not responsible for the #2 generator's in-flight failure since it was assumed to be isolated from the rest of the electrical system.

The flight control system would not have been affected by the loss of electrical power, since it relied on hydraulic and mechanical lines, so it was concluded that the loss of control was the result of the crew's inability to see in the dark cockpit. It was theorized that the non-activation of the backup electrical system might have been for one of several reasons:

- The aircraft's battery, which powered the backup electrical system, could have been inadvertently disconnected by the flight engineer following the shutdown of engine 1, as he made sure that the galley power switch (which was similar in shape and adjacent to the battery switch) was turned off (in accordance with procedures for operating with only one functional generator).
- The battery, or its charging circuitry, could have malfunctioned, rendering it unable to power the backup electrical system.
- The flight engineer could have mistakenly set the aircraft's essential power switch to the APU position, rather than the standby (backup) position; the switch has to pass through a gate when turning from the APU position to the standby position, and the flight engineer, turning the switch until he encountered resistance, may have assumed that this meant that the switch had reached the end of its travel and was now in the standby position, when it had actually hit the detent between the APU and standby positions. The 727's APU is inoperative in flight.
- The flight engineer could simply have neglected to switch the aircraft to the backup electrical system; the United Airlines procedures for the loss of all generators did not, at the time, explicitly tell the crew to switch to backup power (instead focusing on regaining at least one generator), and it is possible that the flight engineer repeatedly tried to bring a generator back online instead of immediately switching the aircraft to the backup system.

The CVR and FDR both lost power just after the crew informed ATC of the fire warning on engine #1. At an unknown later point, both resumed operation for a short period of time. The FDR came back online for 15 seconds, the CVR nine seconds, during which time it recorded the crew discussing their inability to see where the plane was. No sounds of the plane impacting the water could be heard when this second portion of the recording ceased.

At the time, a battery-powered backup source for critical flight instruments was not required on commercial aircraft. The accident prompted the Federal Aviation Administration to require all transport-category aircraft to carry backup instrumentation, powered by a source independent of the generators.

=== Probable cause ===
The NTSB's "probable cause" stated:

"The Board determines that the probable cause of this accident was loss of attitude orientation during a night, instrument departure in which the attitude instruments were disabled by loss of electrical power. The Board has been unable to determine (a) why all generator power was lost or (b) why the standby electrical power system either was not activated or failed to function."

== Related Information ==
On January 13, 1969, just five days before the crash of United Flight 266, Scandinavian Airlines System Flight 933, a DC-8 on final approach to Los Angeles International also crashed into Santa Monica Bay. The jet broke in half on impact, killing 15. Thirty people survived in a portion of the fuselage that remained afloat.

Up until 2013, United used "Flight 266" designation on its San Francisco–Chicago (O'Hare) route.
