= Eastern Air Lines Flight 401 =

1972 aviation accident in Florida

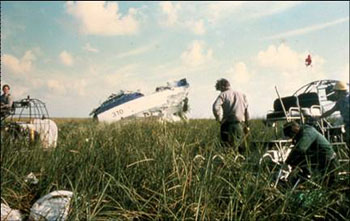
- A piece of the aircraft’s wreckage in the Florida Everglades

Accident
- Date: December 29, 1972
- Summary: Controlled flight into terrain due to pilot error and loss of situational awareness
- Site: Florida Everglades near Miami International Airport Miami-Dade County, Florida, U.S.; 25°52′N 80°36′W

Aircraft
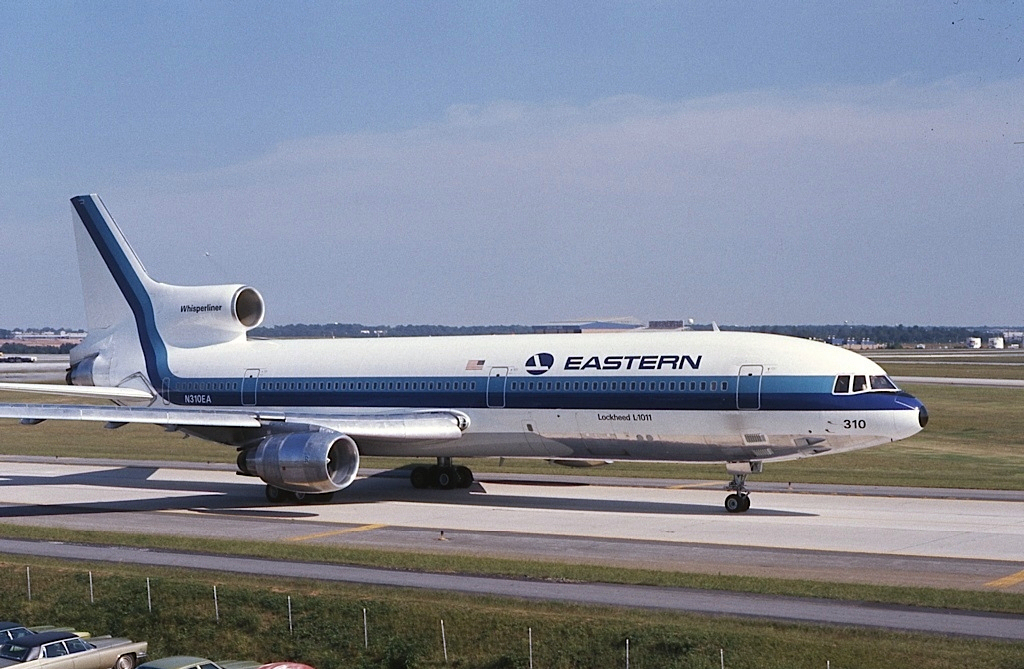
- N310EA, the aircraft involved in the accident
- Aircraft type: Lockheed L-1011-385-1 TriStar
- Operator: Eastern Air Lines
- IATA flight No.: EA401
- ICAO flight No.: EAL401
- Call sign: EASTERN 401
- Registration: N310EA
- Flight origin: John F. Kennedy Int'l Airport
- Destination: Miami Int’l Airport
- Occupants: 176
- Passengers: 163
- Crew: 13
- Fatalities: 101
- Injuries: 75
- Survivors: 75

Eastern Air Lines Flight 401 was a scheduled flight from John F. Kennedy International Airport in Queens, New York, to Miami International Airport in Miami, Florida. Shortly before midnight on December 29, 1972, the Lockheed L-1011 TriStar crashed into the Florida Everglades. All three cockpit crew members, two of the ten flight attendants, and 96 of the 163 passengers were killed. 75 people survived, with 58 of them suffering serious injuries.

The crash is believed to have been caused by a subtle bump of the yoke on the aircraft, causing it to switch the autopilot from altitude hold mode, to Control Wheel Steering mode, causing the aircraft to begin a descent. Due to the focus on a malfunctioning landing gear indicator light, the pilots did not notice the auto pilot being shut off. The aircraft gradually lost altitude and crashed. This was the first hull loss and fatal crash of a Lockheed L-1011 TriStar. It was also the first severe widebody aircraft crash.

== Aircraft ==
Eastern Air Lines Flight 401 was a regularly scheduled flight from John F. Kennedy International Airport in Queens, New York, to Miami International Airport in Miami, Florida. On December 29, 1972, Flight 401 was operated using a Lockheed L-1011 TriStar (registration N310EA), which had been delivered to the airline just a few months earlier on August 18. The aircraft was fleet number 310, and the tenth TriStar delivered to the carrier.

== Flight crew ==
The flight was commanded by Captain Robert Albin Loft, aged 55, a veteran pilot ranked fiftieth in seniority at Eastern Air Lines. Loft had been with the airline for 32 years and had accumulated a total of 29,700 flight hours during his career making him an exceedingly experienced aviator. He had logged 280 hours in the L-1011. His flight crew included First Officer Albert John Stockstill, aged 39, who had 5,800 hours of flying experience (with 306 of them in the L-1011) and Flight Engineer Donald Louis Repo, aged 51, who had 15,700 hours of flying experience (with 53 of them in the L-1011). A company employee—technical officer Angelo Donadeo, aged 47, returning to Miami from an assignment in New York City—accompanied the flight crew for the journey, but was officially an off-duty, "nonrevenue passenger".

== Accident ==
The aircraft flightpath summary, as shown in the NTSB report

Flight 401 departed New York on Friday, December 29, 1972, at 21:20 EST, with 163 passengers and 13 crew members aboard. The flight was routine until 23:32, when the plane began its approach into Miami. After lowering the gear, Stockstill noticed that the landing gear indicator, a green light identifying that the nose gear is properly locked in the "down" position, had not illuminated. This was later discovered to be due to a burned-out light bulb. The landing gear could have been manually lowered nonetheless. The pilots cycled the landing gear, but still failed to get the confirmation light.

Loft, who was working the radio during this leg of the flight, told the tower that they would discontinue their approach to their airport and requested to enter a holding pattern. The approach controller cleared the flight to climb to 2,000 ft (610 m), and then hold west over the Florida Everglades. The cockpit crew removed the light assembly, and Repo was dispatched to the avionics bay beneath the flight deck to check via a small porthole whether the landing gear was indeed down. Fifty seconds after reaching their assigned altitude, Loft instructed Stockstill to put the L-1011 on autopilot.

For the next 80 seconds, the aircraft maintained level flight. Then, it dropped 100 ft (30 m), and then again flew level for two more minutes, after which it began descending so gradually that it could not be perceived by the crew. In the next 70 seconds, the airplane lost only 250 ft (76 m), but this was enough to trigger the altitude warning C-chord chime located under Repo's workstation. Repo had gone below, and there was no indication on the cockpit voice recorder that the pilots had heard the chime. In another 50 seconds, the plane was at half its assigned altitude.

As Stockstill started another turn, onto 180°, he noticed the discrepancy. The following conversation was recovered from the flight voice recorder later:

Stockstill: "We did something to the altitude."
Loft: "What?"
Stockstill: "We're still at 2,000 feet, right?"
Loft: "Hey—what's happening here?"

— Transcript, Eastern Air Lines Flight 401 Cockpit Voice Recorder

Less than ten seconds after this exchange, Flight 401 crashed. The location was west-northwest of Miami, 18.7 mi (30.1 km) from the end of Runway 9L. The aircraft was traveling at 227 miles per hour (197 kn; 365 km/h) when it hit the ground. With the plane in mid-turn, the left wingtip hit the surface first, then the left engine and the left landing gear, making three trails through the sawgrass, each 5 ft (1.5 m) wide and more than 100 ft (30 m) long. When the main part of the fuselage hit the ground, it continued to move through the grass and water, breaking up as it went.

=== Crash sequence ===
The TriStar's port outer wing structure struck the ground first, followed by the number 1 engine and the port main undercarriage. The disintegration of the aircraft that followed scattered wreckage over an area 1,600 ft (500 m) long and 330 ft (100 m) wide in a southwesterly direction. Only small fragments of metal marked the wingtip's first contact, followed 49 ft (15 m) further on by three massive 115 ft (35 m) swaths cut through the mud and sawgrass by the aircraft's extended undercarriage before two of the legs were sheared off. Then came scattered parts from the number 1 (port) engine, and fragments from the port wing itself and the port tailplane. About 490 feet (150 m) from the wingtip's initial contact with the ground, the massive fuselage had begun to break up, scattering components from the underfloor galley, the cargo compartments, and the cabin interior. At 820 ft (250 m) along the wreckage trail, the outer section of the starboard wing tore off, gouging a 59-foot-long (18 m) crater in the soft ground as it did so. From this point on, the breakup of the fuselage became more extensive, scattering metal fragments, cabin fittings, and passenger seats widely.

The three major sections of the fuselage—‌the most intact of which was the tail assembly—‌lay in the mud towards the end of the wreckage trail. The fact that the tail assembly—‌rear fuselage, number 2 tail-mounted engine, and remains of the empennage—‌finally came to rest substantially further forward than other major sections, was probably the result of the center-mounted number 2 engine continuing to deliver thrust during the actual breakup of the aircraft. No complete cross-section of the passenger cabin remained, and both the port wing and tailplane were demolished to fragments. Incongruously, not far from the roofless fuselage center section with the inner portion of the starboard wing still attached, lay a large, undamaged and fully inflated rubber dinghy, one of a number carried on the TriStar in the event of an emergency water landing. The breakup of the fuselage had freed it from its stowage and activated its inflation mechanism.

== Rescue and aftermath ==
Robert Marquis (1929–2008), a local airboat pilot, was out frog gigging with Ray Dickinsin when they witnessed the crash. The two men rushed to rescue survivors. Marquis received burns to his face, arms and legs—a result of spilled jet fuel from the crashed TriStar—but continued shuttling people in and out of the crash site that night and the next day. For his efforts, 35 years after the crash, he received the Humanitarian Award from the National Air Disaster Alliance/Foundation and the "Alumitech – Airboat Hero Award" from the American Airboat Search and Rescue Association.

In all, 75 people survived the crash—67 of the 163 passengers and eight of the ten flight attendants. Despite their own injuries, the surviving flight attendants were credited with helping other survivors and several quick-thinking actions, such as warning survivors of the danger of striking matches due to jet fuel in the swamp water, as flashlights were not part of the standard equipment on commercial airliners at the time, and singing Christmas carols to keep up morale and draw the attention of rescuers. Of the cockpit crew, only Repo and Donadeo survived the initial crash; both were in the avionics bay at the moment of impact. Stockstill was killed on impact, while Loft died in the wreckage of the flight deck before he could be transported to hospital. Repo was evacuated to hospital, but later died from his injuries. Donadeo, the lone survivor of the four flight-deck occupants, recovered from his injuries.

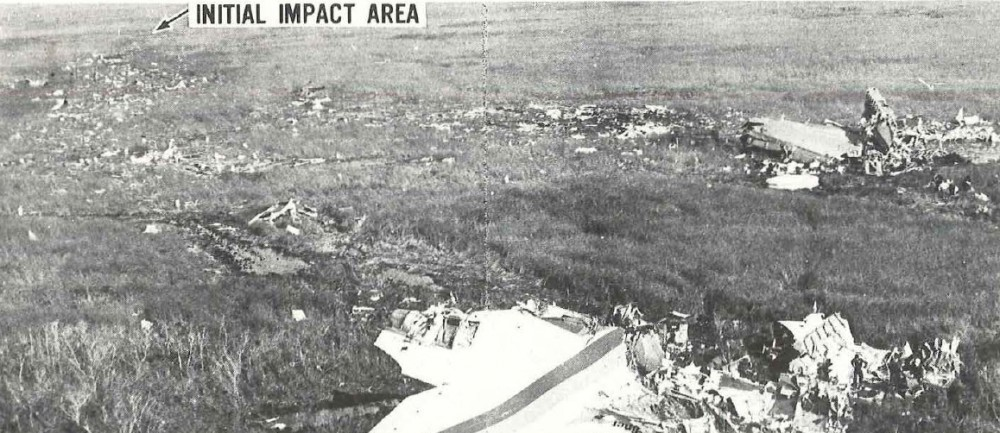
Overview of the aircraft wreckage

Frank Borman, a former NASA astronaut and Eastern's senior vice president of operations, was awakened at home by a telephone call reporting a probable crash. He immediately drove to Eastern's Miami offices and decided to charter a helicopter to the crash site, as the swampy terrain made rescue difficult, and Eastern had not heard any news of progress in rescue efforts. There he was able to land in a swampy patch of grass and coordinate rescue efforts. He accompanied three survivors on the helicopter to hospital, including a flight attendant and a passenger who lost her baby in the crash.

Most of the dead were passengers in the aircraft's midsection. The swamp absorbed much of the energy of the crash, lessening the impact on the aircraft. The muddy waters of the Everglades had covered the wounds sustained by survivors, preventing them from bleeding to death. However, it also complicated the survivors' recuperation, as organisms in the swamp caused infection, with the potential for gas gangrene. Eight passengers became infected and were treated with hyperbaric chambers. All the survivors were injured; 60 received serious injuries and 17 suffered minor ones that did not require hospitalization. The most common injuries were fractures of ribs, spines, pelvises and lower extremities. Fourteen survivors had various degrees of burns. (Note: The NTSB classified the injuries of one nonrevenue passenger and one other passenger as nonfatal, as their deaths occurred more than seven days after the accident. The death toll per the final accident report was 99.)

== Investigation ==
The National Transportation Safety Board (NTSB) investigation discovered that the autopilot had been inadvertently switched from altitude hold to control wheel steering (CWS) mode in pitch. In this mode, once the pilot releases pressure on the yoke (control column or wheel), the autopilot maintains the pitch attitude of the aircraft until the yoke is again moved. Investigators believe the autopilot switched modes when the captain accidentally leaned against the yoke while turning to speak to the flight engineer, who was sitting behind and to the right of him. The slight forward pressure on the stick would have caused the aircraft to enter a slow descent, maintained by the CWS system.

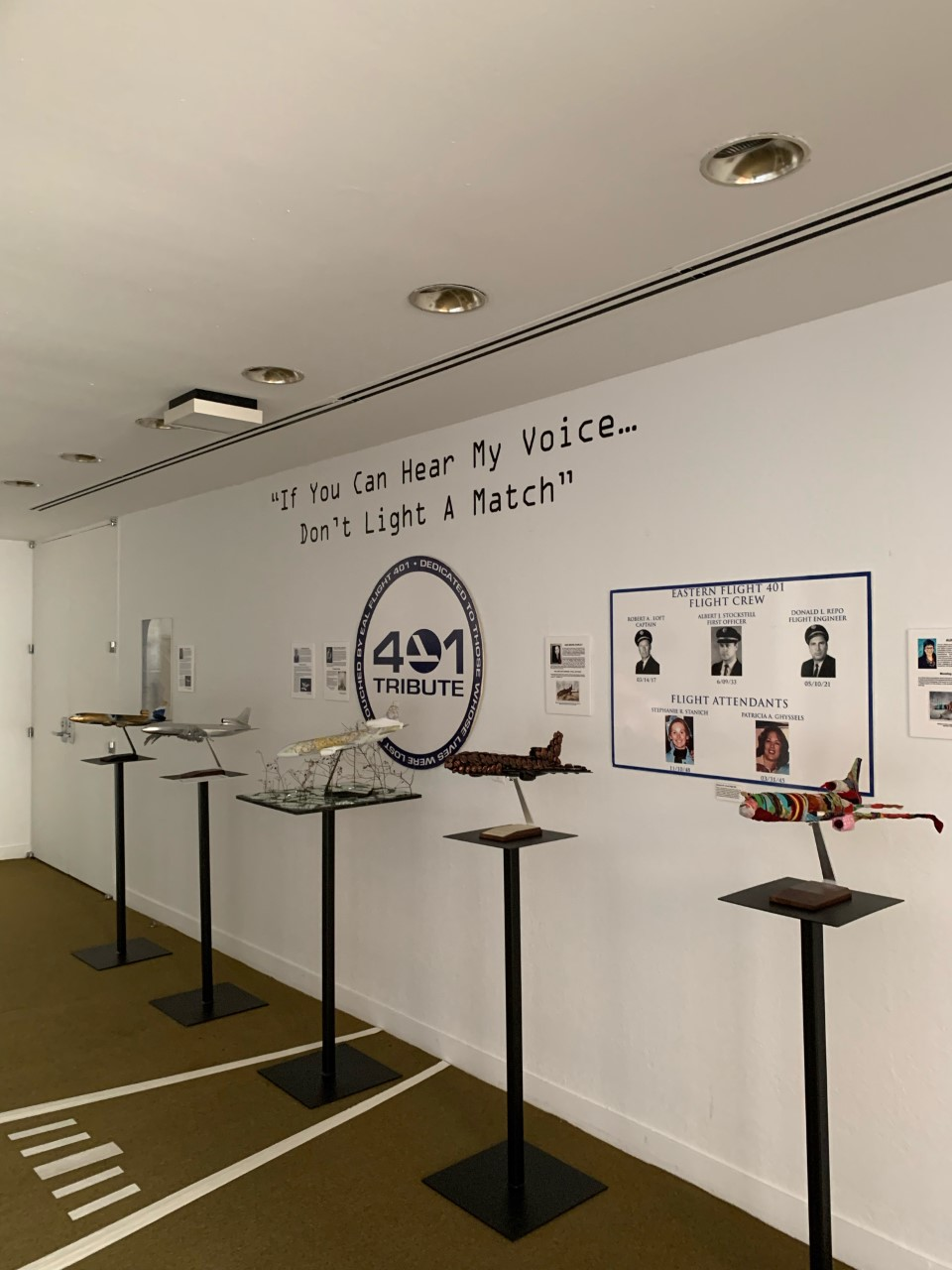
A tribute to Flight 401 at the HistoryMiami Museum

Investigation into the aircraft's autopilot showed that the force required to switch to CWS mode was different between the A and B channels (15 and 20 lbf or 65 and 90 N, respectively). Thus, the switching to CWS in channel A possibly did not occur in channel B, thus depriving the first officer of any indication the mode had changed (channel A provides the captain's instruments with data, while channel B provides the first officer's).

Simultaneous to Eastern 401, another flight in the area, National 607, was also having a landing gear incident, but flight 607's gear was actually jammed. Charles Johnson, one of the air traffic controllers on duty, had been dealing with the incident and aftermath of flight 607 when he was handed ATC control of Eastern 401. Miami ATC had only one three-dimensional radar that could show the height, speed, etc., and Johnson was using that radar. He then received Eastern 401's transmissions. The flight had not declared an emergency. So, Johnson only knew about the so-called "jammed nose gear". He noticed the decrease in Eastern 401's altitude, and made one call to the pilots, asking for their progress. He was told by Loft that 401 was about ready to change course back to the airport. He did not mention their decrease in altitude, as that was not part of the job of ATC at the time, and he did not make further contact before the crash. Another possible cause for Johnson's relaxed attitude regarding the decrease in altitude is that the radar used at the time was known to occasionally report incorrect altitude for brief periods, before correcting. NTSB investigators later determined Johnson was the only person who noticed Eastern 401 descending, but did not fault him, as he had followed all the ATC procedures in place at the time.

After Loft bumped the yoke, the aircraft descended 250 feet (76 m) from the selected altitude of 2,000 feet (610 m). A C chord chime sounded from the rear speaker. This altitude alert was designed to warn the pilots of a deviation of at least 250 feet from the selected altitude, and went unnoticed by the distracted crew. This was possibly compounded by the fact the chime only sounded from the rear speaker, located by the flight engineer's seat, which was unoccupied at the time. Visually, since it was nighttime and the aircraft was flying over the dark terrain of the Everglades, no ground lights or other visual cues were available to indicate the TriStar was slowly descending.

Loft was found during an autopsy to have an undetected brain tumor in an area that controls vision. However, the NTSB concluded that the tumor did not contribute to the accident.

== Cause ==
The final NTSB report cited the cause of the crash as pilot error, specifically: "the failure of the flight crew to monitor the flight instruments during the final four minutes of flight, and to detect an unexpected descent soon enough to prevent impact with the ground. Preoccupation with a malfunction of the nose landing gear position indicating system distracted the crew's attention from the instruments and allowed the descent to go unnoticed."

In response to this and other accidents during the 1970s, many airlines started crew resource management training for their pilots. The training is designed to make problem solving in a cockpit much more efficient by delegating tasks to specific crew members, and ensures one pilot is always monitoring the instruments at any given time. Flashlights are now standard equipment near jumpseats, and all jumpseats are outfitted with shoulder harnesses.

== Reported ghost sightings ==
In the months and years following the crash, stories began circulating that numerous employees and passengers of Eastern had reported sightings of deceased crew members Loft and Repo sitting aboard other L-1011s, in particular N318EA. These stories speculated that the sightings were connected to the fact that parts of the crashed aircraft were salvaged after the investigation and refitted into other L-1011s. The reported hauntings were said to be seen only on the planes that used the spare parts.

Gossip regarding the sightings spread throughout the airline to the extent that Eastern's management warned employees that they could be dismissed if caught spreading ghost stories; Borman, Eastern's CEO, dismissed the ghost stories as "garbage". While Eastern publicly denied their planes were haunted, they reportedly removed all the salvaged parts from their L-1011 fleet. Over time, the reporting of ghost sightings stopped. An original floor board from Flight 401 remains in the archives at History Miami in South Florida. Pieces of the plane's wreckage can also be found in Ed and Lorraine Warren's Occult Museum in Monroe, Connecticut.

The story of the crash and its aftermath were documented in John G. Fuller's 1976 book The Ghost of Flight 401. Fuller recounts stories of paranormal events aboard other Eastern aircraft and the belief that these were caused by equipment salvaged from the wreckage of Flight 401. A television movie adapted from Fuller's book, also titled The Ghost of Flight 401 and emphasizing the ghost sightings, was broadcast by NBC in February 1978. Eastern considered suing Fuller for libel, based on the author's assertions of a cover-up by Eastern executives, but Borman opted not to, feeling a lawsuit would merely provide more publicity for Fuller's book. Loft's widow and children did sue Fuller—for infringement of Loft's right of publicity, invasion of privacy and intentional infliction of emotional distress—but the lawsuit was dismissed and the dismissal upheld by the Florida Fourth District Court of Appeal.

According to Robert J. Serling's 1980 book From the Captain to the Colonel: An Informal History of Eastern Airlines, the claim that wreckage from Flight 401 was installed and later removed from other Eastern aircraft was false, and no Eastern employees had ever claimed to have seen or believed in the alleged ghost sightings. Skeptic Brian Dunning claims that the origin for the ghost sightings may have been a joke made by an Eastern captain after an emergency landing in which he quipped that he "thought [Don] Repo's ghost was on the plane".

== Memorial ==
The Eastern Airlines Flight 401 memorial in Miami Springs, dedicated on December 29, 2022, is located in the 700 block of the Curtiss Parkway near the Curtiss Mansion. This permanent monument honors the 101 people who perished in the 1972 Everglades crash, featuring a plaque with the victims' names, and was spearheaded by survivor Beverly Raposa.

== In popular culture ==
The crash was documented in Rob and Sarah Elder's 1977 book Crash. A television movie of the same name was broadcast in October 1978. Based on the book, it dramatized the crash, rescue efforts, and NTSB investigation. Eddie Albert featured as "Dunn", a fictionalized version of Captain Robert Loft.

Bob Welch's 1979 album Three Hearts includes a song titled "The Ghost of Flight 401".

Footage of the aftermath appears in the disaster documentary Days of Fury (1979), directed by Fred Warshofsky.

The accident and the subsequent ghost story were mentioned by Dan Aykroyd during his appearance on The Tonight Show Starring Johnny Carson on June 6, 1984. It was also featured in an episode of The Unbelievable with Dan Aykroyd.

Flight 401 is mentioned in Supernatural episode "Phantom Traveler" (2005).

The crash was featured in the Discovery Channel Canada/National Geographic TV series Mayday, in "Fatal Distraction" (2008).

It is featured in the 2010 Why Planes Crash episode "Human Error".

"The Ghosts of Flight 401", part of the Discovery+ series Shock Docs, emphasizes the alleged supernatural legacy of the crash.

The flight was mentioned by Dieter F. Uchtdorf in his 2009 General Conference (LDS Church) talk, "We Are Doing a Great Work and Cannot Come down".

== See also ==
- Northwest Orient Airlines Flight 705 – 1963 aviation accident in Florida, in which a Boeing 720 crashed into the Florida Everglades south-west of where Flight 401 crashed
- Eastern Air Lines Flight 212 – 1974 aviation accident
- Lady Be Good – US Army Air Forces aircraft that crashed during WWII in the Libyan desert, a B-24 which was similarly reputed to be cursed after salvaged parts from it were reused in other aircraft
- Scandinavian Airlines System Flight 933 – 1969 aviation accident
- Third man factor – Comforting presence perceived during stress
- United Airlines Flight 173 – 1978 aviation accident in Oregon
- ValuJet Airlines Flight 592 – 1996 aviation accident in Florida, not far from where Flight 401 crashed
- Delta Air Lines Flight 191 – 1985 aviation accident in Texas, a Lockheed L-1011 TriStar
