= United Airlines Flight 173 =

1978 aviation accident in Oregon

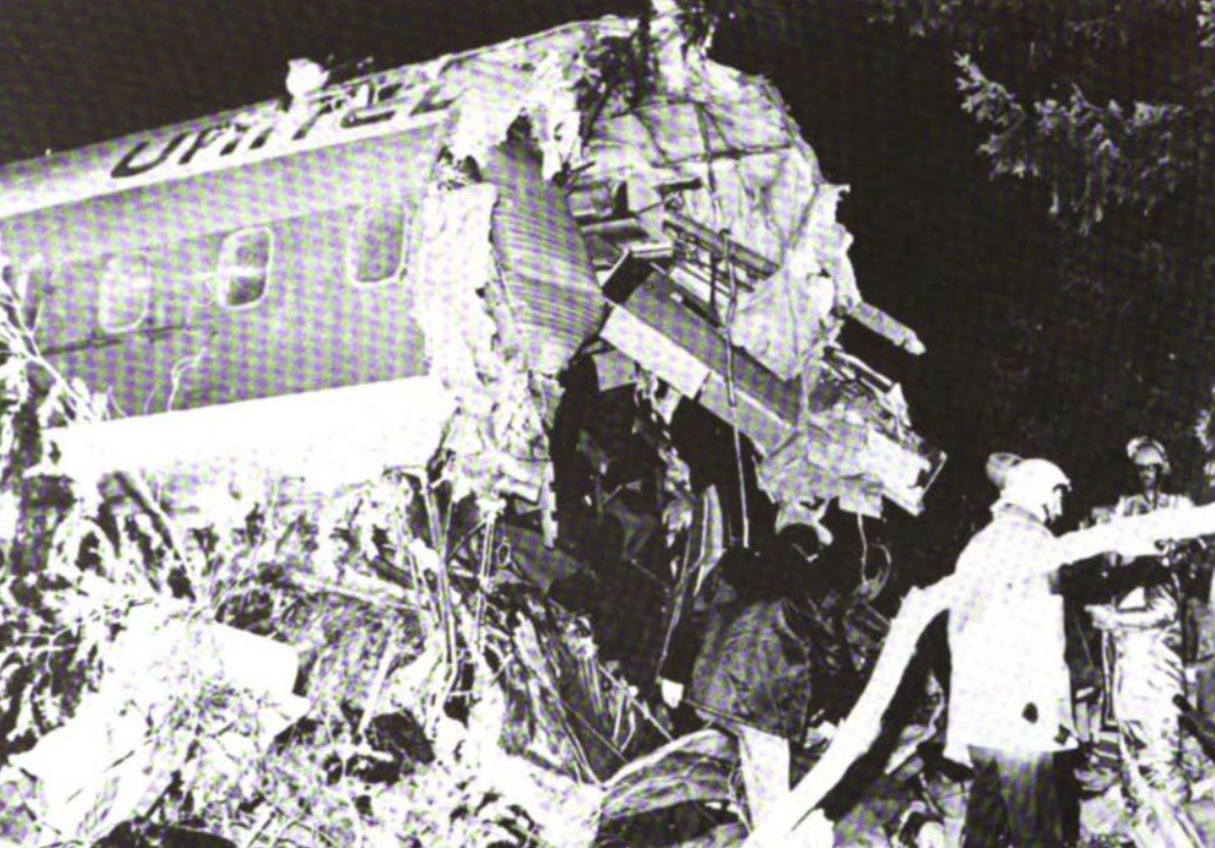
- A close-up view of the aircraft wreckage

Accident
- Date: December 28, 1978
- Summary: Fuel exhaustion due to pilot error (lack of situational awareness) and maintenance error with landing gear
- Site: Near Portland International Airport, Portland, Oregon, United States; 45°31′21″N 122°29′59″W

Aircraft
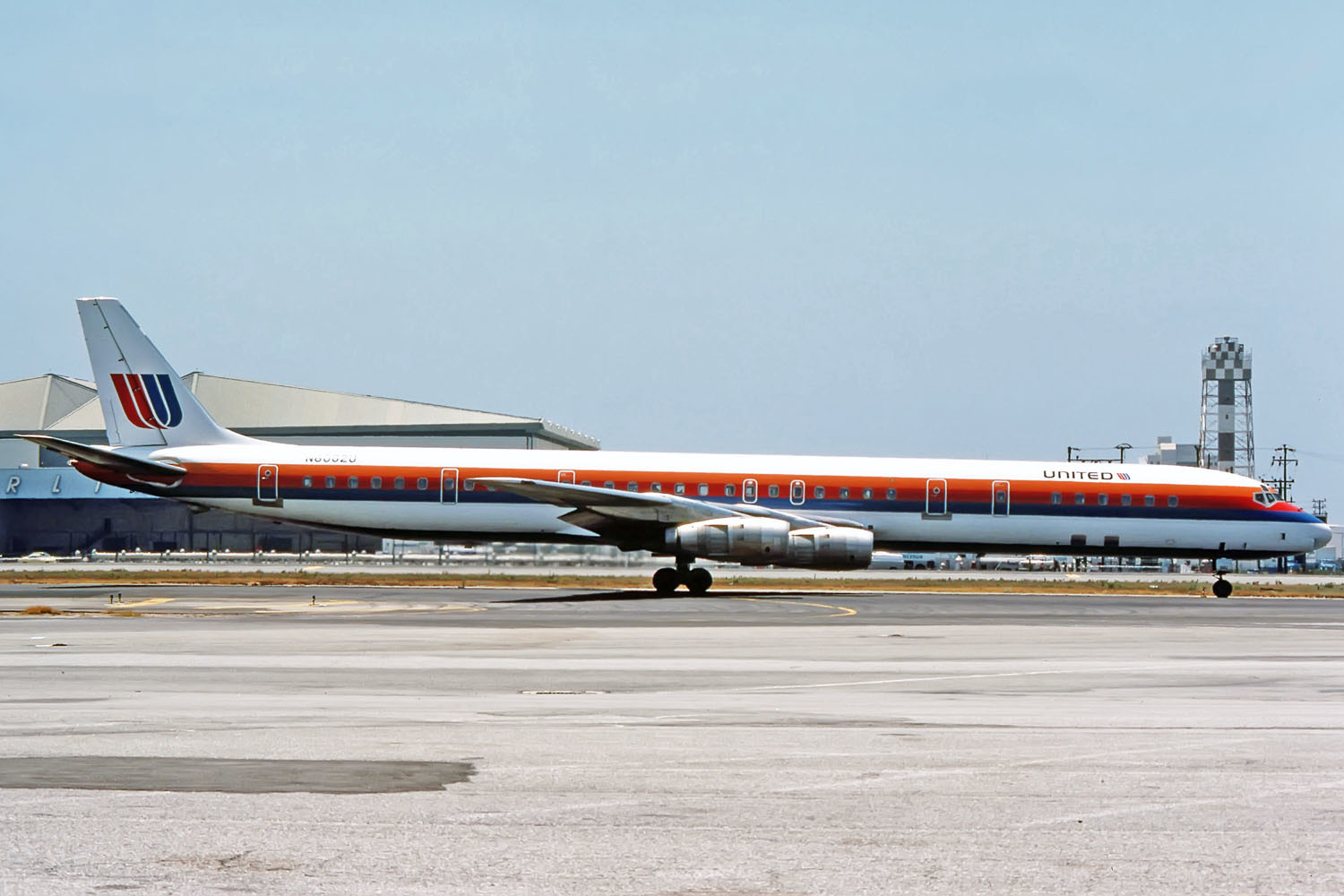
- N8082U, the aircraft involved in the accident, pictured in July 1978
- Aircraft type: McDonnell Douglas DC-8-61
- Operator: United Airlines
- IATA flight No.: UA173
- ICAO flight No.: UAL173
- Call sign: UNITED 173
- Registration: N8082U
- Flight origin: John F. Kennedy International Airport, New York City, New York, United States
- Stopover: Stapleton International Airport, Denver, Colorado, United States
- Destination: Portland International Airport, Portland, Oregon, United States
- Occupants: 189
- Passengers: 181
- Crew: 8
- Fatalities: 10
- Injuries: 27
- Survivors: 179

United Airlines Flight 173 was a scheduled flight from John F. Kennedy International Airport in New York City to Portland International Airport in Portland, Oregon, with a scheduled stop in Denver, Colorado. On December 28, 1978, the McDonnell Douglas DC-8-61 operating the flight ran out of fuel while troubleshooting a landing gear problem and crashed in a suburban Portland neighborhood near NE 157th Avenue and East Burnside Street, killing 10 people on board.

The accident prompted the development of crew resource management in aviation.

== Background ==
=== Aircraft ===
The aircraft involved was a McDonnell Douglas DC-8-61, powered by four Pratt & Whitney JT3D engines and delivered new to United Airlines in May 1968. The aircraft was registered N8082U and was the 357th DC-8 built at the Long Beach assembly plant. The 61 series was a stretched version of the DC-8 that was 36.7 ft (11.2 m) longer than the DC-8 series 10 through 50.

=== Crew ===
Flight 173 was piloted by an experienced cockpit crew, consisting of Captain Malburn "Buddy" McBroom (52), First Officer Roderick "Rod" Beebe (45), and Flight Engineer Forrest "Frosty" Mendenhall (41). McBroom had been with United Airlines for 27 years; he was one of the airline's most senior pilots with more than 27,600 hours of flight time, of which about 5,500 hours had been as a DC-8 captain. Beebe had been with the airline for 13 years and had logged more than 5,200 flight hours. Mendenhall had close to 3,900 flight hours and had been with the airline for 11 years. The first officer and flight engineer had over 2,500 hours of flying experience between them in the DC-8.

== Flight ==
Flight 173 departed from Denver's Stapleton International Airport at 15:47 MST with 189 people on board — 8 crew and 181 passengers. The estimated flight time was 2 hours and 26 minutes, and the planned arrival time in Portland was 17:13 PST, about 40 minutes after sunset. According to the automatic flight plan and monitoring system, the total amount of fuel required for the flight to Portland was 31,900 lb (14,500 kg). About 46,700 lb (21,200 kg) of fuel was on board the aircraft when it departed the gate in Denver.

As the landing gear was being lowered on approach to Portland International Airport, the crew felt an abnormal vibration and yaw of the aircraft and a lack of an indicator light showing the gear was lowered successfully. The crew requested a holding pattern to diagnose the problem, and for about the next hour, the crew flew over southeast Portland and worked to identify the status of the landing gear and prepare for a potential emergency landing. During this time, the co-pilot and flight engineer attempted to passively alert Captain McBroom about their low fuel, a situation which was exacerbated by the fact that the gear was down with the flaps at 15° during the entire hour-long holding maneuver, significantly increasing fuel burn rate. Due to cockpit culture at the time, neither crew member adequately conveyed the seriousness of the fuel situation, leaving the captain to believe he had more fuel remaining than he actually had. As a result, the number 3 and 4 engines eventually flamed out.

As the crew prepared for a final approach for an emergency landing on runway 28L, the number one and number two engines quit due to fuel starvation flameouts, at which point a mayday was declared. This was the last radio transmission from Flight 173 to air traffic control; it crashed into a wooded section of a populated area of northeast Portland, about six nautical miles (11 km; 7 mi) southeast of the airport, near 15845 E. Burnside Street.

Of the crew members, two were killed, flight engineer Mendenhall and lead flight attendant Joan Wheeler; two sustained injuries classified by the National Transportation Safety Board (NTSB) as "serious", and four sustained injuries classified as "minor/none". Eight passengers died, and twenty-one had serious injuries.

The 304th Aerospace Rescue and Recovery Squadron of the Air Force Reserve, based at Portland International Airport, was conducting routine training flights in the area that evening. Airborne aircraft from this unit (HH-1H Huey helicopters) were immediately diverted to the crash scene and proceeded to transport many of the survivors to local hospitals.

== Crash investigation and report ==
The NTSB investigation revealed that, when the landing gear was lowered, a loud thump was heard. That unusual sound was accompanied by abnormal vibration and yaw of the aircraft. The right main landing gear retract cylinder assembly had failed due to corrosion, and that allowed the right gear to free fall. Although it was down and locked, the rapid and abnormal free fall of the gear damaged a microswitch so severely that it failed to complete the circuit to the cockpit green light that tells the pilots that gear is down and locked. Those unusual indications (loud noise, vibration, yaw, and no green light) led the captain to abort the landing, so he would have time to diagnose the problem and prepare the passengers for an emergency landing. While the decision to abort the landing was prudent, the accident occurred because the flight crew became so absorbed with diagnosing the problem that they failed to monitor their fuel state and calculate a time when they needed to return to land or risk fuel exhaustion.

The Safety Board believes that this accident exemplifies a recurring problem—a breakdown in cockpit management and teamwork during a situation involving malfunctions of aircraft systems in flight… Therefore, the Safety Board can only conclude that the flight crew failed to relate the fuel remaining and the rate of fuel flow to the time and distance from the airport, because their attention was directed almost entirely toward diagnosing the landing gear problem.

The NTSB determined the following probable cause:

The failure of the captain to monitor properly the aircraft's fuel state and to properly respond to the low fuel state and the crewmember's advisories regarding fuel state. This resulted in fuel exhaustion to all engines. His inattention resulted from preoccupation with a landing gear malfunction and preparations for a possible landing emergency.

The NTSB also determined the following contributing factor:

The failure of the other two flight crewmembers either to fully comprehend the criticality of the fuel state or to successfully communicate their concern to the captain

The fuel situation was known to be on the minds of the pilot and crew to some degree. Transcripts of cockpit recordings confirm this. Media reports at the time suggested that a not widely known problem existed with fuel state gauges on that model aircraft. The problem was not widely known in part because commercial aircraft are expected to fly with no less than a 45-minute reserve of fuel at all times. The gauge problem is addressed, though obliquely, in one of the safety board's recommendations:

Issue an Operations Alert Bulletin to have FAA inspectors assure that crew training stresses differences in fuel-quantity measuring instruments and that crews flying with the new system are made aware of the possibility of misinterpretation of gauge readings. (Class II, Priority Action, A-79-32)

While the totalizer fuel gauge issue might have contributed to the crew's confusion toward the end of the flight, the NTSB report emphasized that the captain should never have allowed such a situation to develop in the first place. The NTSB made the following recommendation to specifically address that concern:

Issue an operations bulletin to all air carrier operations inspectors directing them to urge their assigned operators to ensure that their flightcrews are indoctrinated in principles of flight deck resource management, with particular emphasis on the merits of participative management for captains and assertiveness training for other cockpit crewmembers. (Class II, Priority Action, X-79-17)

== Aftermath ==
This last NTSB recommendation following the incident, addressing flight deck resource management problems, was the genesis for major changes in the way airline crewmembers were trained. This new type of training addressed behavioral management challenges such as poor crew coordination, loss of situational awareness, and judgment errors frequently observed in aviation accidents. It is credited with launching the crew resource management (CRM) revolution in airline training. Within weeks of the NTSB recommendation, NASA held a conference to bring government and industry experts together to examine the potential merits of this training.

United Airlines instituted the industry's first CRM for pilots in 1981. This program is now used throughout the world, prompting some to call the United 173 accident one of the most important in aviation history. The NTSB Air Safety Investigator who wrote the CRM recommendation was aviation psychologist Alan Diehl.

Diehl realized the accident was similar to several other major airline accidents including United Airlines Flight 2860, which occurred a little over a year before Flight 173 and under near identical circumstances; Eastern Air Lines Flight 401; and the Tenerife airport disaster. Diehl was familiar with the research being conducted at NASA’s Ames Research Center and believed these training concepts could reduce the likelihood of human error.

Held responsible for the accident, Captain McBroom lost his pilot's license and retired from United Airlines shortly afterwards. He spent his remaining years battling health problems related to injuries sustained in the crash, as well as lung and prostate cancers. Family members and passengers who spoke to McBroom at a 1998 reunion of crash survivors reported he was "a broken man" plagued by guilt over his role in the accident. He died on October 9, 2004, at age 77.

One of the surviving passengers, who was three years old in 1978, was awarded US$900,000 in damages in 1984 (equivalent to $2.8 million in 2025) from the airline by a Portland jury. She was injured and both her little sisters and her parents were killed.

Published in February 2018, Crash Course by Julie Whipple focuses on the events of the night of the crash, the investigation, and aftermath of the crash.

== In popular culture ==
- The events of Flight 173 were featured in the 2013 episode "Focused on Failure", of the Canadian TV series Mayday
- It is featured in season 2, episode 1, of the TV show Why Planes Crash, in an episode called "Crisis in the Sky"

== See also ==
- Aviation safety
- List of accidents and incidents involving commercial aircraft
- List of airline flights that required gliding
- United Airlines Flight 2860
- Eastern Air Lines Flight 401
- Avianca Flight 052
- Tenerife Airport Disaster
