= Robert J. Serling =

American writer

- Born: Jerome Robert Serling; March 28, 1918; Cortland, New York, U.S.
- Died: May 6, 2010 (aged 92); Tucson, Arizona, U.S.
- Resting place: Lake View Cemetery; Interlaken, New York, U.S.
- Occupations: Novelist, writer
- Spouses: Patricia Huntley (m. 1949; div. 19??); Priscilla Arone (m. 1968; died 2000); Patricia Hoyer (m. 2002)
- Children: 2
- Relatives: Rod Serling (brother)
- Writing career
- Years active: 1945–2008
- Genres: Non-fiction, historical fiction, aviation stories
- Notable work: The President's Plane Is Missing

Robert Jerome Serling (born Jerome Robert Serling; March 28, 1918 – May 6, 2010) was an American novelist and aviation writer.

== Biography ==
Born in Cortland, New York and raised in Binghamton, Serling graduated from Antioch College in 1942. He "deplored the name Jerome" and swapped his first and middle names as a young man. He was the older brother of screenwriter and The Twilight Zone creator Rod Serling.

Serling became full-time aviation editor for United Press International in 1960. He wrote at least eight novels and sixteen books of nonfiction. His novel The President's Plane Is Missing was made into a 1973 made-for-TV film starring Buddy Ebsen. He received the 1988 Lauren D. Lyman Award "for distinguished achievement in the field of aviation and aerospace journalism."

He had two children with his second wife, Priscilla Arone, a former Western Airlines stewardess. His daughter Jennifer is a veterinary technician.

Serling died of pancreatic cancer on May 6, 2010, at age 92 in Tucson, Arizona.

== Career ==
He was a United Press International, Washington, DC, reporter and manager of Radio News Division, 1945–60, aviation editor, 1960–66; air safety lecturer and consultant, beginning 1966. His brother Rod Serling hired him as a technical consultant (for which he received on-screen credit) for the airplane sequences in the episode "The Odyssey of Flight 33" of his hit TV-show The Twilight Zone. Robert Serling also received advisor or researcher credits on two other Rod Serling scripts: one each for scripts penned for Studio One and Playhouse 90. He was a reporter for the Washington Redskins and travelled with the team and roomed with quarterback Eddie LeBaron. He was a very devout conservative Republican, in contrast to his brother’s liberal Democratic stance.

He was a member of the Society of Air Safety Investigators and the Aviation/Space Writers Association

He collected commercial airline models (more than four hundred during his life) and material on aviation research. In 2008, was featured speaker at the 32nd annual Airliners International collectibles show and convention in Dallas, Texas.

He authored the short story "Ghost Writer" published in Twilight Zone: 19 Original Stories on the 50th Anniversary. His Something's Alive on the Titanic and The President's Plane Is Missing and ‘’Air Force One is Haunted’’ are fantasy novels set in real life high-profile backdrops.

== Awards ==
He received numerous honors of his work throughout his career:

- Trans-World Airlines, seven awards, 1958–65, for aviation news reporting
- Strebig-Dobben Memorial Award, 1960
- special citations from Sherman Fairchild Foundation, 1963
- Flight Safety Foundation, 1970
- Airline Pilots Association, 1970
- Aviation/Space Writers Association
- James Trebig Memorial Award, 1964
- special citation, 1967
- award in fiction, 1966, for The Left Seat
- award in non-fiction, 1969, for Loud and Clear

== Fiction ==
Title	Published	ISBNs	Notes
The Left Seat	Doubleday, 1966		Paperback: Popular Library, 1966
The President's Plane Is Missing	Doubleday, 1967		Paperback: Dell, 1968
She'll Never Get off the Ground	Doubleday, 1971		Paperback: Dell, 1972
McDermott's Sky	Laurel Group, 1977	0930392000, 9780930392000	Paperback: Pocket Books, 1980
Wings	Dial Press, 1978	0803795920, 9780803795921	Paperback: New American Library, 1979
Stewardess	St. Martin's, 1982	0312761937, 9780312761936	Paperback: New American Library, 1984
Air Force One Is Haunted	St. Martin's, 1985	0312015348, 9780312015343	Sequel to The President's Plane Is Missing, again featuring President Haines
Something's Alive on the Titanic	St. Martin's, 1990	031205159X, 9780312051594	Paperback: St. Martin's, 1993

== Non-fiction ==
Title	Published	ISBN	Notes
The Probable Cause: The Truth About Air Travel Today	Doubleday & Co., 1960	Library of Congress 60–15194	Paperback: Ballantine Books, 1964
The Electra Story	Doubleday & Co., 1963	Library of Congress 63–7715	Paperback: Bantam Books, 1991
Loud and Clear: The Full Answer to Aviation's Vital Question – Are the Jets Really Safe?	Doubleday & Co., 1969		Paperback: Dell, 1970
Birth of an Industry: A Nostalgic Collection of Airline Schedules for the Years 1929 to 1939 (in facsimile)	R. H. Donnelly, 1969		
Ceiling Unlimited: The Story of North Central Airlines	Walsworth Publishing, 1973	LCCN 73090730	
Little Giant: The Story of Gates LearJet	Serling, 1974		
Maverick: The Story of Robert Six and Continental Airlines	Doubleday & Co., 1974	0385040571, 9780385040570	
The Only Way to Fly: The Story of Western Airlines, America's Senior Air Carrier	Doubleday & Co., 1976	0385013426, 9780385013420	
The Jet Age	Time-Life Books, 1978	9780809433636, 9780809433629	Series: "The Epic of Flight"
From the Captain to the Colonel: An Informal History of Eastern Airlines	Dial Press, 1980	0803746105, 9780803746107	
Howard Hughes' Airline: An Informal History of TWA	St. Martin's Press, 1983	0312396317, 9780312396312	
Eagle: The Story of American Airlines	St. Martin's Press, 1985	0312224532, 9780312224530	
Countdown: An Autobiography	Silver Arrow, 1988	0-688-07929-6, 9780688079291	co-authored with Frank Borman
Legend and Legacy: The Story of Boeing and Its People	St. Martin's Press, 1992	031205890X 9780312058906	
When the Airlines Went to War	Kensington Books, 1997	1575662469, 9781575662466	
Steel Rails and Silver Wings: The Lindbergh Line to the Birth of TWA	Weekend Chief Pub., 2006	0961281499, 9780961281496	co-authored with George H. Foster
Character and Characters: The Spirit of Alaska Airlines	Documentary Media, 2008	9781933245119	
