= Flight 63 =

Flight 63 may refer to:

- American Airlines flight 63, the Richard Reid 2001 failed shoe bomb attempt
- American Airlines Flight 63 (Flagship Missouri), a DC-3 that crashed outside of Centerville, Tennessee on October 15, 1943
- American Airlines Flight 63 (Flagship Ohio), a DC-3 that crashed outside of Trammel, Kentucky on July 28, 1943
- Toa Domestic Airlines Flight 63 (1971)
- STS-63 (1995) U.S. Space Shuttle mission to the Mir space station

== See also ==
- American Airlines Flight 63 (disambiguation)
