= American Airlines Flight 63 =

American Airlines Flight 63 (IATA: AA 63; ICAO: AAL63; AMERICAN 63) may refer to several separate events involving a flight with that designation.

- American Airlines Flight 63 (2001), a failed terror attack on December 22, 2001
- American Airlines Flight 63 (October 1943), a DC-3 that crashed outside of Centerville, Tennessee, on October 15, 1943, killing all 11 on board
- American Airlines Flight 63 (July 1943), a DC-3 that crashed outside of Trammel, Kentucky, on July 28, 1943, killing 20 out of 22 on board
- American Airlines Flight 63, a Boeing 777 involved in a near miss with EasyJet Flight 6074 on 15 September 2006 above Nantes, France, after the latter suffered an electrical failure.

== See also ==
- American Airlines accidents and incidents
