= List of American Airlines accidents and incidents =

American Airlines Flight 11 explodes after impacting 1 World Trade Center during the September 11 attacks. Another plane from the airline, Flight 77, was crashed into the Pentagon one hour and nine minutes later. The hijacking and crash of Flight 11 was the deadliest aviation incident in history.

As of January 2025, American Airlines has had almost 60 aircraft hull losses, beginning with the crash of a Ford 5-AT-C Trimotor in August 1931. Of the hull losses, most were propeller-driven aircraft, including three Lockheed L-188 Electra aircraft (of which one, the crash in 1959 of Flight 320, resulted in fatalities). The two accidents with the highest fatalities in both the airline's and U.S. aviation history were Flight 191 in 1979 and Flight 587 in 2001.

Out of the 17 hijackings of American Airlines flights, two aircraft were hijacked and destroyed in the September 11 attacks: Flight 11 crashed into the North Tower of the World Trade Center and Flight 77 crashed into the Pentagon. Flight 11, which is responsible for an estimated 1,700 deaths, is the deadliest air crash in the history of aviation.

Two training flight accidents have occurred in which the crew was killed and six that resulted in no fatalities. Another four jet aircraft have been written off due to incidents while they were parked between flights or while undergoing maintenance.

== 1930s ==
- August 9, 1931: A Ford 5-AT-C Trimotor, registration NC9662, crashed on the bank of the Little Miami River near Cincinnati, Ohio, killing all six on board. The cause was failure and separation of the right-side engine due to a broken hub.
- December 31, 1931: A Pilgrim 100A, registration NC708Y, crashed at Brighton, Ohio, after the pilot became disoriented in poor weather, killing four of five on board.
- March 19, 1932: A Fokker F-10A, registration NC652E, crashed in an orchard near Calimesa, California, after striking power lines in heavy fog, killing all seven on board. The pilot had reduced altitude due to thick fog and had descended too low.
- September 8, 1932: A Fokker F-10A, registration NC9716, crashed into a mountain in fog near Salt Flat, Texas, killing all three on board. The aircraft was operating a cargo flight from El Paso to Dallas.
- January 20, 1933: A Stearman 4-CM1, registration NC11721, crashed into a hillside in poor visibility near Boerne, Texas, killing the pilot. The cause was spatial disorientation.
- March 6, 1934: A Pilgrim 100A, registration NC710Y, crashed into a snowdrift near Petersburg, Illinois, during a blizzard, killing all four on board. The cause was wing/propeller icing.
- June 9, 1934: A Curtiss T-32 Condor II, registration NC12354, crashed into Last Chance Hill in the Catskill Mountains in upstate New York, killing all seven on board. The cause was pilot error.
- December 22, 1934: A Lockheed 9 Orion, registration NC12286, crashed into the side of a mountain located 32 km (19.88 mi) southwest of Louisville Airport at an altitude of 6,000 feet shortly after taking off from the airport en route to Nashville. The pilot, the sole occupant, was killed.
- January 14, 1936: A Douglas DC-2-120 operating as American Airlines Flight 1 crashed near Goodwin, Arkansas, killing all 17 people on board. Its cause is undetermined.
- January 29, 1936: A Vultee V-1A, registration NC13767, struck trees and crashed at Little Elm, Texas, after the pilot descended too low in poor visibility, killing the pilot; the five passengers were injured, but survived.
- May 26, 1936: A trimotor [type unknown] caught fire 600 feet above Chicago Municipal Airport, forcing an emergency landing. Edward Coates, pilot, suffered severe burns as he brought the plane down for a landing. Co-pilot was W.C. Carnegie, and one passenger, R.A. Atalo. All three onboard were from Detroit. The plane was carrying airmail and express packages.
- August 13, 1936: A Curtiss AT-32A Condor II, registration NC12392, caught fire and exploded at Grand Central Air Terminal in Glendale, California, as it was being prepared for a flight on behalf of a film company; no casualties resulted.
- September 27, 1937: Two Curtiss T-32 Condor IIs (AT-32B NC12394 and AT-32D NC12397) burned out in hangar fires.

== 1940s ==
- March 10, 1941: American Airlines Flight 20, a Douglas DC-3, landed next to the runway and rolled into a levee at Cincinnati Municipal Airport due to weather and pilot error; all 12 on board survived. The aircraft was repaired and returned to service.
- October 30, 1941: American Airlines Flight 1, a Douglas DC-3 en route from New York City to Detroit with two stopovers at Buffalo and Chicago, stalled and dived into a plowed field over St. Thomas, Ontario, Canada, killing all 20 on board after circling to look for a place to land. Its cause is undetermined.
- October 23, 1942: American Airlines Flight 28 (Flagship Connecticut), en route from Burbank, California, to New York City, crashed in Chino Canyon near Palm Springs after it was clipped by a U.S. Army Air Forces Lockheed B-34 Ventura II bomber. The crash killed all nine passengers and crew of three aboard the Douglas DC-3; among the victims was award-winning composer and Hollywood songwriter Ralph Rainger. The bomber, being flown by a two-man crew, landed safely.
- July 28, 1943: American Airlines Flight 63 (Flagship Ohio), a Douglas DC-3 routing Cleveland-Columbus-Dayton-Cincinnati-Louisville-Nashville-Memphis crashed about 1.6 miles (2.6 km) west of Trammel, Kentucky. The aircraft descended from 200 feet (61 m) until it struck trees, then traveled across an open field and stopped in an upright position. Of the 22 people on board (18 passenger and four crew), 20 died. The cause of the crash was loss of control due to severe turbulence and violent downdrafts.
- September 15, 1943: A Douglas DC-3, registration NC33657, stalled and crashed shortly after takeoff from Love Field; both pilots survived.
- October 15, 1943: American Airlines Flight 63 (Flagship Missouri), a Douglas DC-3 routing Nashville-Memphis crashed near Centerville, Tennessee. The aircraft was cleared to climb by air traffic control, but it instead descended until it struck a hill and burst into flames. All 11 people on board (eight passengers and three crew) were killed. The cause of the crash was determined to be icing, either on the wings or propellers.
- February 10, 1944: American Airlines Flight 2, a DC-3 routing Little Rock, Arkansas-Memphis crashed into the Mississippi River about 18.1 miles (29.1 km) from Memphis International Airport. All 24 occupants on board (21 passengers and three crew members) were killed; 11 of the fatalities were members of the armed services. The cause of the crash was never determined.
- December 24, 1944: American Airlines Flight 21, a Douglas DST, collided with a Taylorcraft BL-65 (NC24403) near Saline, Michigan; the BL-65 lost control and crashed while the DST performed a wheels-up, flaps-down landing. All on both aircraft survived. The cause of the crash was lack of vigilance of the crew of the DST.
- January 10, 1945: American Airlines Flight 6001, a Douglas DC-3, was approaching Lockheed Air Terminal, now known as Bob Hope Airport, in Burbank, California, when it apparently veered to the left as if circling to land. The pilot radioed, stating he could not gain visual contact with the ground and requested vectors to Palmdale. Clearance to proceed was given, but the flight was not seen or heard from again until the next day, when search crews found the wreckage in foothills about 3 miles (4.8 km) northeast of the Lockheed Air Terminal. All 24 occupants (21 passengers and three crew), including 17 members of the Army and Navy, were killed. The cause of the crash was determined to be the pilot's missed approach procedure to the point where it could not be applied safely.
- February 23, 1945: American Airlines Flight 9, a Douglas DC-3 flying on a routing New York City-Washington, DC-Nashville-Los Angeles, crashed into the wooded summit of Glade Mountain about 6 miles (9.7 km) southwest of the town of Rural Retreat, Virginia. Of the 22 occupants on board (19 passengers and three crewmembers), 17 were killed. The cause of the crash was determined to be pilot error in not properly remaining at a safe altitude.
- March 3, 1946: American Airlines Flight 6-103, a Douglas DC-3, routing New York City-Tucson-San Diego, crashed into Thing Mountain, near El Centro, California. The crew reported flying over El Centro; thereafter the aircraft descended and crashed into the mountain. All 27 occupants on board (22 paid passengers, two infants, and three crew) were killed. The cause of the crash was determined to be the pilot's action in permitting the descent to occur, for which no explanation has been found.
- August 25, 1946: American Airlines Flight 26, (Flagship Tulsa), a Douglas C-47, was on a training flight originating and terminating in Memphis. Around 5 miles (8.0 km) west-southwest of Ashland, Mississippi, the aircraft crashed into the ground. Both occupants on board were killed. The cause of the crash was determined to be an unexplained loss of control.
- December 28, 1946: American Airlines Flight 2207, a Douglas C-50A, routing Detroit-Chicago crashed near Michigan City, Indiana, after an emergency diversion to South Bend after the pilot reported problems with both engines. Of the 21 occupants on board (18 passengers and three crew), two of the crew were killed. The cause of the crash was determined to be fuel starvation in both engines.
- January 5, 1947: American Airlines Flight 203, a Douglas DC-3, landed wheels-up at Jones Beach, New York, due to radio interference problems; all 16 on board survived. The cause of the crash was the "inability of the pilot to land at a prepared landing area due to the loss of radio navigation reference resulting from severe static interference".
- August 8, 1947: American Airlines Flight 765, a Douglas DC-3 flying New York City-Buffalo on a cargo flight (transporting an engine) crashed into Flushing Bay while returning to La Guardia Airport after the pilot reported low oil pressure in the number-two engine. The aircraft sank in about five minutes. Both pilots on board were killed. The cause of the crash was determined to be insufficient air speed for single-engined operation while attempting the landing.
- October 8, 1947: An American Airlines Douglas DC-4 over Texas went into a steep dive after a prank played by an off-duty pilot. The off-duty pilot secretly activated the wind-gust lock in flight, which resulted in the command pilot, not realizing that the wind-gust lock was activated, rolling the elevator trim with no response. When the off-duty pilot deactivated the gust lock, the aircraft went into a steep dive, executed part of an outside loop and became inverted. Neither the command pilot nor the off-duty pilot had his seat belts fastened, which led them to hit the propeller feathering switches with their heads. No one realized the feathering reduced power, but it allowed the strapped-in copilot to bring the aircraft back under control at an altitude of 350 feet.
- November 11, 1947: A Douglas DC-6, registration NC90741, landed in flames at Gallup Airport after the pilot reported a fire in the rear of the aircraft; all 25 on board survived. Although severely damaged by the fire, the intact aircraft was used to determine the cause of the crash of United Air Lines Flight 608. All DC-6s were grounded and recalled so the cabin heater intake scoop could be redesigned and moved. These changes still stand to this day.
- March 10, 1948: A Douglas C-54B, registration NC90426, suffered nose-gear collapse at Love Field; all 36 on board survived. During takeoff from Tulsa, the nose gear struck a snowdrift, and the damage prevented it from being raised.
- December 3, 1948: American Airlines Flight 183, a Douglas DC-6, suffered separation of engine four over New Mexico, 2 hours and 46 minutes into the flight from Dallas to Tucson. A fire erupted in the engine nacelle, but was quickly extinguished. Unable to determine the extent of the damage to the nacelle, the pilot decided on an emergency landing at CAA Auxiliary Field in Columbus, New Mexico, where the aircraft landed safely without further incident. The cause of the engine separation was fatigue failure of the number-four propeller caused by a defect during manufacture.
- June 22, 1949: American Airlines Flight 402, a Convair 240, nosed up on takeoff and landed wheels-up near Memphis, following engine failure; all 44 on board survived.
- November 29, 1949: American Airlines Flight 157, a Douglas DC-6, veered off the runway and struck buildings after the flight crew lost control of the aircraft during its final approach to Dallas Love Field; of the 41 passengers and five crew, 26 passengers and two crew members were killed.

== 1950s ==
- August 22, 1950: American Airlines Flight 14 (Flagship Arizona), a Douglas DC-6 flying from Los Angeles to Chicago suffered decompression after a propeller blade from the number-three engine failed and punctured the fuselage near Eagle, Colorado. The plane made a safe landing in Denver. One passenger with a heart condition died. The cause of the accident was fatigue in the propeller.
- January 22, 1952: American Airlines Flight 6780 (Flagship New Haven), a Convair 240, was on routing Buffalo-Rochester-Syracuse-Newark, when it crashed at the intersection of Williamson and South Streets in the city of Elizabeth, New Jersey, about 3.4 miles (5.5 km) southeast of Newark while descending for a landing. The aircraft was noticed to be drifting off course and descending prior to the crash. All 23 occupants on board (20 passengers and three crew) plus seven civilians on the ground were killed. Among the passengers was Robert P. Patterson, former undersecretary of war under Franklin Delano Roosevelt and former secretary of war under Harry S. Truman. The cause of the crash was never determined.
- June 28, 1952: A Temco Swift private aircraft flew into the number-four propeller of American Airlines Flight 910, a Douglas DC-6 carrying 55 passengers and five crew, on final approach to Dallas Love Field from San Francisco, California. The Swift crashed, killing both occupants, but the DC-6 was almost completely unscathed and landed safely. The crash was attributed to the failure of the Swift's pilot to maintain visual separation with the DC-6 while on approach.
- September 16, 1953: American Airlines Flight 723 (Flagship Bristol), a Convair 240, was flying Boston-Springfield-Albany-Syracuse-Rochester-Buffalo-Detroit-Chicago, when it crashed and caught fire after flying into a series of radio towers in a fog while descending for landing. All 28 occupants on board (25 passengers and three crew) were killed.
- January 20, 1954: American Airlines Flight 767 (Flagship Peoria), a Convair 240, crashed quickly after taking off from Buffalo Niagara International Airport. The left engine failed, causing the pilot to attempt a return to the airport. A successful wheels-up landing was made southeast of the airport 200 yards south of 2478 George Urban Blvd. in Depew, New York. No deaths and few injuries were reported.
- June 27, 1954: A Convair 240 (Flagship Narragansett), registration N94263, collided with US Navy Beechcraft SNB-2C Navigator 23773 while approaching Port Columbus International Airport; the SNB crashed and burned, killing both pilots, while the Convair landed at Columbus. Despite a collapsed nose gear on landing, all 35 on board the Convair survived.
- July 6, 1954: American Airlines Flight 163, a Douglas DC-6, registration N90773, was at Hopkins Airport in Cleveland, Ohio, preparing for a flight to St. Louis when an unticketed 15-year-old forced his way onto the plane and into the cockpit with an empty pistol in an attempt to force the plane to fly to Mexico. The captain distracted the boy, produced his own gun and shot the perpetrator dead.
- March 20, 1955: American Airlines Flight 711 (Flagship Nashville), a Convair 240, was flying from St. Louis to Springfield, Missouri, when it crashed a quarter-mile short of the airport while landing. Of the 35 occupants on board (32 passengers and three crew), 13 were killed. The cause of the crash was determined to be spatial disorientation and inattention to instruments.
- August 4, 1955: American Airlines Flight 476 (Flagship Philadelphia), a Convair 240, flying Tulsa, Oklahoma-Springfield-St. Louis-New York City crashed while attempting to make an emergency landing at Fort Leonard Wood, Missouri, after the number-two engine caught fire. While descending, the right wing failed due to the fire and the aircraft crashed in a forest. All 30 occupants were killed. The investigation revealed that an unairworthy cylinder that had been installed in the engine had failed in flight, causing the fire.
- January 6, 1957: American Airlines Flight 327 (Flagship Mount Vernon), a Convair 240 flying Providence, Rhode Island-Joplin, Missouri-Tulsa when it struck trees about 4 miles (6.4 km) north of the approach end to Runway 17 at Tulsa International Airport, slid along the ground to the top of an upslope, and then jumped a ditch and came to rest 540 feet (160 m) from the approach end. Of the 10 occupants on board (seven passengers and three crew), one passenger was killed. The cause of the crash was determined to be the lack of alertness by the captain in allowing the first officer to continue the descent to too low an altitude.
- March 5, 1957: American Airlines Flight 87 (Flagship Will Rodgers), a Douglas DC-7, registration N316AA, suffered explosive decompression over Tennessee after the number-one propeller separated. Despite the damage, the aircraft landed safely in Dallas with no casualties. A failed thrust bearing assembly caused the propeller separation. The aircraft was repaired and returned to service.
- February 3, 1959: American Airlines Flight 320 (Flagship New York), a Lockheed L-188 Electra, crashed into the East River on approach to LaGuardia Airport due to pilot error; 65 of the 73 on board died.
- March 15, 1959: American Airlines Flight 2815 (Flagship Seneca), a Convair 240, registration N94273, struck a 96-foot-tall steel tower while on approach to Midway Airport and crashed in a rail yard; both pilots survived. The aircraft was completing a cargo flight from New York City to Chicago.
- August 15, 1959: American Airlines Flight 514 (Flagship Connecticut), a Boeing 707, was on a training flight ending at Grumman Peconic River Airport, Calverton, New York, now known as Calverton Executive Airpark, when during descent, the aircraft began a barrel roll to the right, yawed, and crashed in flames after the pilots shut off the engines to simulate a flameout. All five crew on board were killed. The cause of the crash was determined to be the failure of the crew to recognize the yaw.

== 1960s ==
- September 14, 1960: American Airlines Flight 361, a Lockheed L-188 Electra, caught its landing gear on a dike while landing at LaGuardia Airport. The aircraft came to rest upside down. No fatalities occurred among the 76 occupants (70 passengers, six crew).
- January 28, 1961: American Airlines Flight 1502 (Flagship Oklahoma, a Boeing 707) was on a training flight from Idlewild Airport (now John F. Kennedy International Airport) when it crashed about 5 mi (8 km) west of Montauk Point after being seen in a left-wing-low steep dive. All six occupants on board were killed. The cause of the crash was determined to be a loss of control for reasons unknown.
- September 24, 1961: American Airlines Flight 44, a Boeing 720, ran off the runway on landing at Logan International Airport due to pilot error; all 71 on board survived.
- March 1, 1962: American Airlines Flight 1, a Boeing 707, crashed shortly after takeoff from Idlewild Airport due to a maintenance error causing rudder failure. All 95 people on board were killed. At the time, it was the nation's highest death toll involving a single commercial airplane.
- August 6, 1962: American Airlines Flight 414, a Lockheed L-188 Electra, was landing at McGhee Tyson Airport just outside of Knoxville, Tennessee, in a severe thunderstorm, when it skidded off the runway. No fatalities or serious injuries resulted, but the plane was written off.
- May 30, 1963: A Convair 990 Coronado, registration N5616, burned out while parked at Newark International Airport following an APU fire.
- November 8, 1965: American Airlines Flight 383, a Boeing 727, crashed on approach to Cincinnati airport. The aircraft crashed, killing 58 and leaving four survivors, including a flight attendant, Toni Ketchell. Pilot error was cited as the cause.
- November 12, 1967: A Boeing 727 was flying over Alamosa, Colorado, when a bomb detonated in the rear baggage compartment, destroying three bags. The plane landed one hour and 45 minutes later. The FBI arrested the man responsible.
- August 3, 1969: A Boeing 707, registration N7567A, was struck near Fort Worth, Texas, by a Cessna 172K (N79073) that hit the 707's left horizontal stabilizer. The Cessna crashed, killing its pilot, while the 707 landed safely. The cause was failure of both pilots to see and avoid the other aircraft.

== 1970s ==
- May 25, 1970: American Airlines Flight 206, a Boeing 727, was hijacked by a passenger demanding to be taken to Cuba.
- October 25, 1971: American Airlines Flight 98 was hijacked to Cuba.
- December 21, 1971: American Airlines Flight 47, a Boeing 707, was hijacked.
- June 12, 1972: American Airlines Flight 96, a new McDonnell Douglas DC-10 en route from Los Angeles to New York, with stops in Detroit Metropolitan Wayne County Airport and Buffalo Niagara International Airport, had its rear cargo door open in flight, causing an explosive decompression over Windsor, Ontario. Tail controls were damaged, but it landed safely at Detroit. The cause was a design flaw of the DC-10 rear cargo door latching mechanism. (See Turkish Airlines Flight 981)
- June 23, 1972: American Airlines Flight 119, a Boeing 727 from St. Louis to Tulsa International Airport, was hijacked by Martin J. McNally under the pseudonym of Robert W. Wilson, who demanded $502,500. The plane flew back and forth between Tulsa and St. Louis while the ransom was raised. In St. Louis, live news reports about the hijacking prompted David J. Hanley, a 30-year-old businessman, to crash his 1972 Cadillac at 80 mph through two airport fences, travel down the runway at high speed, and crash into the nose gear of the plane, which was beginning to taxi. The demolished car lodged under the fuselage and one wing. Hanley suffered multiple injuries and was charged with willfully damaging a civilian aircraft. The hijacker transferred to a new 727 and jumped out of the plane over Indiana. The full loot bag and gun were discovered by searchers near Peru, Indiana. Fingerprints led to McNally. While in Marion Federal Prison, McNally and fellow inmate and hijacker Garrett Trapnell on May 24, 1978, were involved in an attempted prison escape after Trapnell's girlfriend hijacked a helicopter. The escape attempt ended when the helicopter pilot grabbed the woman's gun and killed her. McNally was paroled from prison January 27, 2010. Trapnell died in prison of illness.
- July 12, 1972: American Airlines Flight 633, a Boeing 727, was hijacked en route to Dallas. The hijacker demanded a ransom to be paid before surrendering.
- November 26, 1975: American Airlines Flight 182, a McDonnell Douglas DC-10-10, narrowly averted a midair collision with TWA Flight 37, a Lockheed L-1011 TriStar. The plane made an emergency landing in Detroit. No fatal injuries happened.
- April 27, 1976: American Airlines Flight 625, a Boeing 727, crashed on approach to Saint Thomas, U.S. Virgin Islands, resulting in a considerable number of fatalities (37 died of the 88 on board). The aircraft overran the short 4,658 foot runway, and pilot error was cited. American subsequently ceased all jet service into St. Thomas until runway expansion and other airport improvements were completed. During this interim period, American served St. Thomas with Convair 440 propeller aircraft operated by a wholly owned subsidiary, American Inter-Island Airlines. The Convair 440 aircraft were owned by American and flown and maintained by Antilles Air Boats, a seaplane operator in the U.S. Virgin Islands.
- May 25, 1979: American Airlines Flight 191, a DC-10, crashed at Chicago's O'Hare International Airport. During the takeoff roll, the left engine and pylon separated from the wing. The crew continued the takeoff, but wing damage due to the engine separation also damaged the aircraft hydraulic system and caused retraction of some flight-control surfaces. The loss of the engine stopped the power to the captains systems including the mechanism that would move the control stick which would alert the captain of a stall. The cockpit voice recorder (CVR) also ceased to record after it lost power from engine number 1. The aircraft rolled and crashed shortly after takeoff. All 258 passengers and 13 crew were killed. Two people on the ground were also killed. The crash remains America's worst aviation accident.
- June 20, 1979: American Airlines Flight 293 was hijacked by Nikola Kavaja. He demanded and received another aircraft, intending to crash it into the headquarters of the Yugoslav Communist Party. The aircraft landed in Ireland and the hijacker surrendered.
- November 15, 1979: American Airlines Flight 444 en route from Chicago-Washington, DC, fell victim to the Unabomber, who had sent a pipe bomb through the mail. The mail was in the plane's cargo hold. The bomb, with an atmospheric pressure trigger set to explode at a certain altitude, failed to fully detonate. It emitted large quantities of smoke, and 12 passengers were treated for smoke inhalation after landing. There were no fatalities.
- November 24, 1979: American Airlines Flight 395 was hijacked by a passenger demanding to be taken to Iran. The plane was stormed by police and the hijacker was arrested in Texas.

== 1980s ==
- April 9, 1980: American Airlines Flight 348, a Boeing 727, was hijacked and taken to Cuba.
- October 23, 1981: American Airlines Flight 676 was hijacked by an individual demanding to be taken to Canada.
- September 22, 1983: American Airlines Flight 625 was taken over when a hijacker handed a hand-written note to a flight attendant, threatening to blow up the plane if it was not diverted to Cuba. He stayed in the lavatory until the plane landed. The hijacker was arrested in Havana.
- February 11, 1984: American Airlines Flight 658 was hijacked by a Haitian Army corporal armed with an Uzi. He demanded to be taken to New York City and requested political asylum after landing. He handed his gun to the crew and was arrested.
- December 31, 1984: American Airlines Flight 626, a DC-10, was hijacked during a flight from St. Croix Airport to New York John F. Kennedy International Airport by a prisoner who was under armed escort. Feigning flight sickness, he went into the restroom and came out with a gun. The aircraft landed at Havana Airport. The hijacker was taken into Cuban custody.
- April 16, 1985: On American Airlines flight 199, a Boeing 727, engine number three was ripped off its mounts while flying at an altitude of 35,000 feet. Frozen fluid from a leakage of the lavatory waste drain valve was ingested by the engine. No injuries were reported.
- June 27, 1985: American Airlines Flight 633, a DC-10, taking off from Luis Muñoz Marín International Airport to Dallas/Fort Worth International Airport in Texas overran the runway and nosedived into a nearby lake, causing substantial damage to the aircraft and 32 injuries.
- May 8, 1987: American Eagle Flight 5452, a CASA C-212 Aviocar flying from Luis Muñoz Marín International Airport to Eugenio María de Hostos Airport, crashed during landing at Eugenio María de Hostos Airport, killing two of the six occupants.
- February 3, 1988: American Airlines Flight 132, an MD-83, flying from Dallas/Fort Worth International Airport to Nashville International Airport, experienced a cargo-hold fire because of a chemical reaction resulting from undeclared and improperly packaged hazardous materials. No fatalities resulted, but 13 people were seriously injured.
- February 19, 1988: American Eagle Flight 3378, a Fairchild Swearingen Metroliner operating a scheduled domestic flight from Raleigh-Durham Airport to Richmond International Airport struck a reservoir shortly after take-off, killing all 12 occupants on board.
- May 21, 1988: American Airlines Flight 70, a DC-10-30 bound for Frankfurt, overran Runway 35L at Dallas/Fort Worth International Airport during an attempted rejected takeoff; the jetliner continued to accelerate for several seconds before slowing, and did not stop until it had run 1,100 feet (335 m) past the runway threshold, collapsing the nose landing gear. Two crew were seriously injured and the remaining 12 crew and 240 passengers escaped safely; the aircraft was severely damaged and was written off.
- October 1, 1988: American Airlines Flight 658 was stormed and hijacked by three Haitian soldiers, demanding political asylum and to be taken to New York City. They surrendered after the pilots agreed to fly there.
- November 27, 1988, a high-pressure bleed valve of an American Airlines Airbus A300 failed during takeoff from Luis Muñoz Marín International Airport. The aircraft made an emergency landing and was evacuated, injuring 14 passengers in the progress.
- May 27, 1989: A Cuban immigrant hijacked an American Airlines Boeing 727. Armed with a starter pistol, two knives, and scissors, and claiming to have explosives, he demanded to be taken back to Cuba. He surrendered after the plane landed in Miami to refuel.

== 1990s ==
- June 7, 1992: American Eagle Flight 5456, a CASA C-212 was a scheduled commuter flight between Luis Muñoz Marín International Airport and Eugenio María de Hostos Airport. The aircraft crashed during approach into Eugenio María de Hostos Airport, killing all 5 occupants on board.
- January 22, 1993: Three bullets hit the right side of the fuselage of American Airlines Flight 917, an Airbus A300 inbound from Miami with 177 passengers and 13 crew, while either landing or taxiing on the runway after landing at Lima's Jorge Chávez International Airport. No one was killed, and the plane sustained minimal damage. The insurgent group Shining Path, which was carrying a wave of attacks against US interests, claimed responsibility for the attack, but a subsequent investigation failed to identify the actual assailants. Airport authorities reportedly stated that the source of the shots was accidental, originating from a security guard working on the perimeter.
- April 14, 1993: The pilot of American Airlines Flight 102, a DC-10-30, lost directional control during a crosswind landing in rainy conditions, which caused the jetliner to slide off Runway 17L at Dallas/Fort Worth International Airport after arriving from Honolulu, Hawaii. The aircraft dug into deep mud alongside the runway, collapsing the nose landing gear and tearing off the left engine and much of the left wing. Two passengers suffered serious injuries while using the evacuation slides to escape from the steeply tilted fuselage; the remaining 187 passengers and all 13 crew evacuated in relative safety, but the aircraft was written off.
- October 31, 1994: American Eagle Flight 4184, officially operating as Simmons Airlines Flight 4184, was a scheduled domestic passenger flight from Indianapolis, Indiana, to Chicago. The ATR 72 performing this route flew into severe icing conditions, lost control, and crashed into a field. All 68 people aboard were killed in the high-speed impact.
- December 13, 1994: American Eagle Flight 3379, a Jetstream 32 operating a scheduled domestic flight between Piedmont Triad International Airport and Raleigh–Durham International Airport, stalled and crashed into a forest whilst approaching Raleigh–Durham International Airport. 15 of the 20 passengers and crew were killed.
- November 12, 1995: American Airlines Flight 1572, a McDonnell Douglas MD-83 on a domestic scheduled passenger flight from Chicago to Hartford, Connecticut, struck trees and landed short of the runway threshold on landing at Bradley International Airport. One injury occurred among the 78 on board. The cause of the incident was determined to be the failure of the crew to properly maintain the required altitude during descent.
- December 20, 1995: American Airlines Flight 965, a Boeing 757, crashed into a mountain on approach to Calí, Colombia, due to pilot error. Of the 163 passengers and crew aboard, 159 passengers and crew were killed; four passengers and a dog survived.
- March 5, 1997: American Airlines Flight 320, a McDonnell Douglas MD-82, veered off the left of runway 5L at Cleveland Hopkins International Airport during landing. Three passengers were injured and the aircraft was substantially damaged.
- May 12, 1997, American Airlines Flight 903, an Airbus A300 flying from Boston to Miami, entered a stall at 16,000 feet during its descent into Miami. The flight crew regained control of the aircraft at 13,000 feet and diverted to Palm Beach International Airport. Two people were injured.
- February 9, 1998: American Airlines Flight 1340, a Boeing 727 struck the ground short of the runway 14R threshold at Chicago O'Hare International Airport while conducting a category II instrument landing system-coupled approach. All 121 passengers and crew survived, but the aircraft was written off.
- June 1, 1999: American Airlines Flight 1420, an MD-82, overran the runway while landing during a storm at Little Rock, Arkansas. In total, 11 people were killed.

== 2000s ==
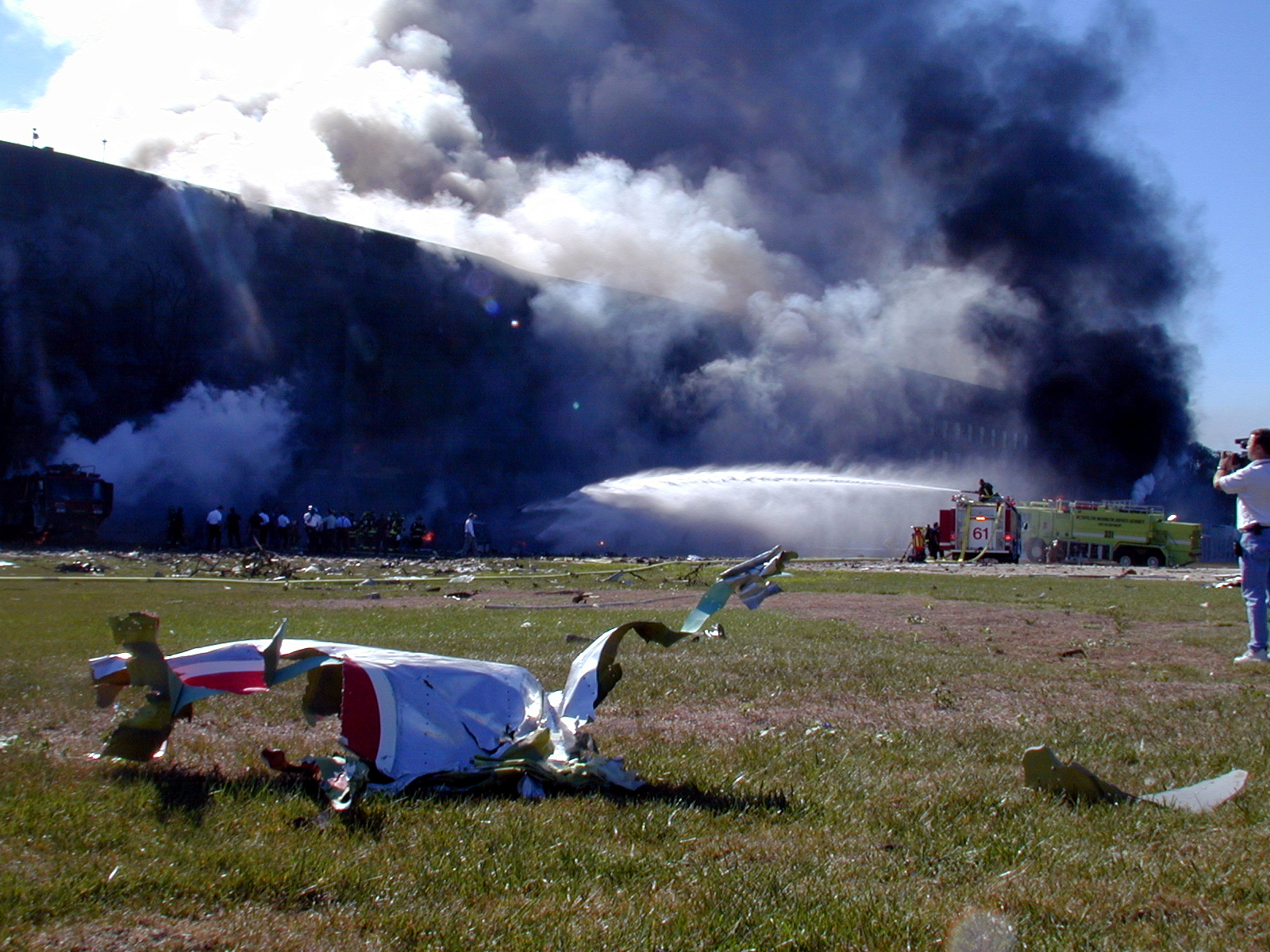
Debris and smoke from American Airlines Flight 77 after crashing into the Pentagon during the September 11 attacks

- November 20, 2000: Purser Jose Chiu, of American Airlines Flight 1291, an Airbus A300, died when a pressurized cabin door opened abruptly during an emergency evacuation at Miami International Airport. The airplane took off from Miami for a planned flight to Haiti. Climbing through 16,000 feet (4,900 m), bleed air from the engines pressurized the cabin to an artificial altitude of 8,000 feet (2,400 m) as normal. About 11 minutes after departure, warnings from lavatory smoke detectors and a warning light indicating a possible fire in the belly hold (both false, as it turned out) caused the captain to return the aircraft to Miami and order an emergency evacuation upon landing. However, the forward cabin outflow valve was partially blocked by insulation blankets. The blocked valve prevented the cabin from depressurizing and resulted in the cabin pressure increasing further after landing. A flight attendant in the rear cabin (investigators could not determine which one) came forward and advised the captain that the emergency exit doors would not open. About 40 seconds after this statement, Chiu was observed trying to force the handle with both hands. The door, under an estimated 1,500 pounds of pressure, suddenly burst open. The rush of escaping air hurled Chiu more than 40 feet (12 m) out of the left main door to his death. Two flight service directors in the forward area also were knocked unconscious when the door exploded open.
- May 23, 2001: The right main landing gear of American Airlines Flight 1107, a Fokker 100, collapsed upon landing on Runway 17C at Dallas/Fort Worth International Airport after a scheduled flight from Charlotte/Douglas International Airport. The pilot was able to maintain directional control and bring the aircraft to a stop on the runway. The incident was attributed to metal fatigue caused by a manufacturing flaw in the right main gear's outer cylinder; there were no serious injuries to the 88 passengers or four crew, but the aircraft was written off.
- September 11, 2001: Two of the four planes hijacked in the September 11 attacks were American Airlines flights.
  - American Airlines Flight 11, a Boeing 767-200ER operating from Boston to Los Angeles was flown into the North Tower of the World Trade Center. Flight 11 is the deadliest crash in aviation history.
  - American Airlines Flight 77, a Boeing 757-200 from Washington-Dulles to Los Angeles was flown into the Pentagon.
- November 12, 2001: American Airlines Flight 587, an Airbus A300, crashed in the Belle Harbor neighborhood of New York City shortly after takeoff from John F. Kennedy International Airport due to separation of the vertical stabilizer after the first officer overused the rudder while trying to counter wake turbulence from a Boeing 747-400 ahead of them. All 260 people aboard the plane and five people on the ground were killed in the second-deadliest aviation accident on US soil, behind only Flights 11 and 191. As Flight 587 crashed only two months after the 9/11 attacks, it was initially thought to be another attack.
- December 22, 2001: A plot to bomb American Airlines Flight 63 by "shoe bomber" Richard Reid was foiled. The flight was en route from Paris-Charles De Gaulle to Miami, and was diverted to Boston's Logan Airport.
- September 16, 2004: American Airlines Flight 1374, an MD-82 from Chicago O'Hare to Philadelphia International Airport, suffered a bird strike just after takeoff, causing parts of the engine to fall near houses in Niles, Illinois. The plane returned to O'Hare, where a successful emergency landing was made. No injuries were reported among the 107 passengers and five crew.
- October 19, 2004: AmericanConnection Flight 5966 was a scheduled domestic flight between St. Louis Lambert International Airport and Kirksville Regional Airport, which crashed on approach to Kirksville, killing 13 of the 15 occupants on board.
- December 7, 2005: A passenger on American Airlines Flight 924, Rigoberto Alpizar, was shot and killed by a team of federal air marshals on a jetway at Miami International Airport. Air marshals claimed that Aplizar had said he had a bomb, though other passengers disputed this account and no explosives were found. The incident was the first ever shooting by air marshals in the United States. The aircraft had arrived from Medellín, Colombia and was continuing to Orlando, Florida; the shooting took place as passengers were re-boarding following customs and immigration inspections.
- June 2, 2006: A Boeing 767-223ER (registered N330AA, MSN: 22330/LN: 166) suffered a catastrophic engine failure and fire while under maintenance at Los Angeles International Airport.
- September 15, 2006: An American Airlines Boeing 777 operating Flight 63 was involved in a near miss with EasyJet Flight 6074, an A319-111 over Nantes, France. The A319 had suffered an electrical failure which caused the loss of the aircraft's radios, EFIS, ECAM, and TCAS systems. The 777 had 144 people on board, with no injuries reported.
- September 28, 2007: American Airlines Flight 1400, an MD-82 from St. Louis Lambert International Airport to Chicago O'Hare International Airport, suffered an engine fire on the left engine right after takeoff, and a partial hydraulic and electrical failure. The aircraft returned to St. Louis and made a successful emergency landing after one go-around. No injuries were reported among the 138 passengers and crew, although the aircraft was substantially damaged. During the investigation it was determined that the captain and ground crew had started the engine using an unapproved method.
- May 19, 2009: Thomas Jukovich, an American Airlines ramp worker, died after falling to the ground while loading luggage onto Flight 995 at Miami International Airport. The aircraft, a Boeing 777, was scheduled to depart to São Paulo, Brazil. The flight was later cancelled.
- December 22, 2009: American Airlines Flight 331, a Boeing 737-800, overran the runway while landing at Norman Manley International Airport in Kingston, Jamaica during heavy rain. The aircraft came to rest on an access road just short of the Caribbean Sea, with its fuselage broken in three. There were no deaths, but 85 of the 154 people on board were injured.

== 2010s ==
- October 28, 2016: American Airlines Flight 383, a Boeing 767-300ER flying from Chicago to Miami, was accelerating for takeoff when the right engine had an uncontained engine failure. The crew aborted the takeoff and emergency crews were able to extinguish the fire. Twenty people suffered minor injuries.
- April 10, 2019: American Airlines Flight 300, an Airbus A321-200 flying from John F Kennedy International Airport to Los Angeles International Airport, suffered a loss of control on takeoff, causing the aircraft to bank sharply to the left and the left wing to scrape across the ground, colliding with a runway sign; the aircraft was able to circle back for an emergency landing. No injuries resulted, but the plane was written off.

== 2020s ==
- On June 13, 2022, a particularly intense supercell coincided with the landing of American Airlines Flight 151 at Chicago O'Hare, which caused extreme turbulence. Ground ASOS reported a record-tying wind gust of 84 mph (135 km/h) at the airport around this time. One passenger was physically removed from her seat as a result, suffering severe injuries. She was not wearing a seatbelt at the time. A lawsuit against the airline was filed in 2024, alleging that the seatbelt sign was not on during the incident.
- On January 29, 2025, American Eagle Flight 5342 from Wichita Dwight D. Eisenhower National Airport to Ronald Reagan Washington National Airport, a Bombardier CRJ701ER operated by PSA Airlines (wholly owned by AA), was hit by a United States Army Sikorsky UH-60 Black Hawk helicopter on final approach to Reagan Airport. The collision caused both aircraft to crash into the Potomac River. All 64 passengers and crew on the CRJ and three crew members on the helicopter were killed.
- On February 1, 2025, Air Wisconsin Flight 6181 (operated under the American Eagle brand name), a Bombardier CRJ200 collided with a tug vehicle operating for United Airlines at Chicago O'Hare. The Chicago Department of Aviation reported that no passengers on the plane were injured and there were no significant impacts on operations at O’Hare. The man operating the tug sustained head and lower-body injuries and was taken in critical condition to Advocate Lutheran General Hospital, where he was stabilized.
- On March 13, 2025, American Airlines Flight 1006, a Boeing 737-800 flying from Colorado Springs Airport en route to Dallas-Fort Worth International Airport diverted to Denver International Airport in Colorado after experiencing high engine vibrations. After landing, the right engine caught fire shortly before or shortly after arriving at the gate. No emergency had previously been declared, and emergency fire equipment did not arrive for several minutes. Several dozen passengers deplaned using the left over-wing exits, but had to wait for ground crew to bring air stairs and ramps since trailing-edge wing flaps were not deployed as a slide. The other passengers used the air bridge and the right rear inflatable slide. All 172 passengers and 6 crew aboard the flight were evacuated safely, although twelve passengers were taken to the hospital with minor injuries. They have sent a replacement aircraft to take the passengers to their intended destination.
- On May 9, 2025, American Airlines Flight 1175, an Airbus A321-200 taking off from San Francisco International Airport was found smoking off its left engine. After takeoff, debris of the left engine were found on the runway, including the thrust reverse liner. The crew were unaware of the damage, and the aircraft continued its climb, eventually landing at Dallas Fort Worth International Airport with no injuries or deaths.
- On July 26, 2025, American Airlines Flight 3023, a Boeing 737 MAX 8 plane carrying 173 passengers and six crew members on board, aborted takeoff in Denver after a suspected landing gear failure and a fire forced passengers to evacuate via emergency slides. One person was taken a medical facility and five people were evaluated for injuries at the scene.
