= American Airlines Flight 102 =

1993 aviation accident in Texas

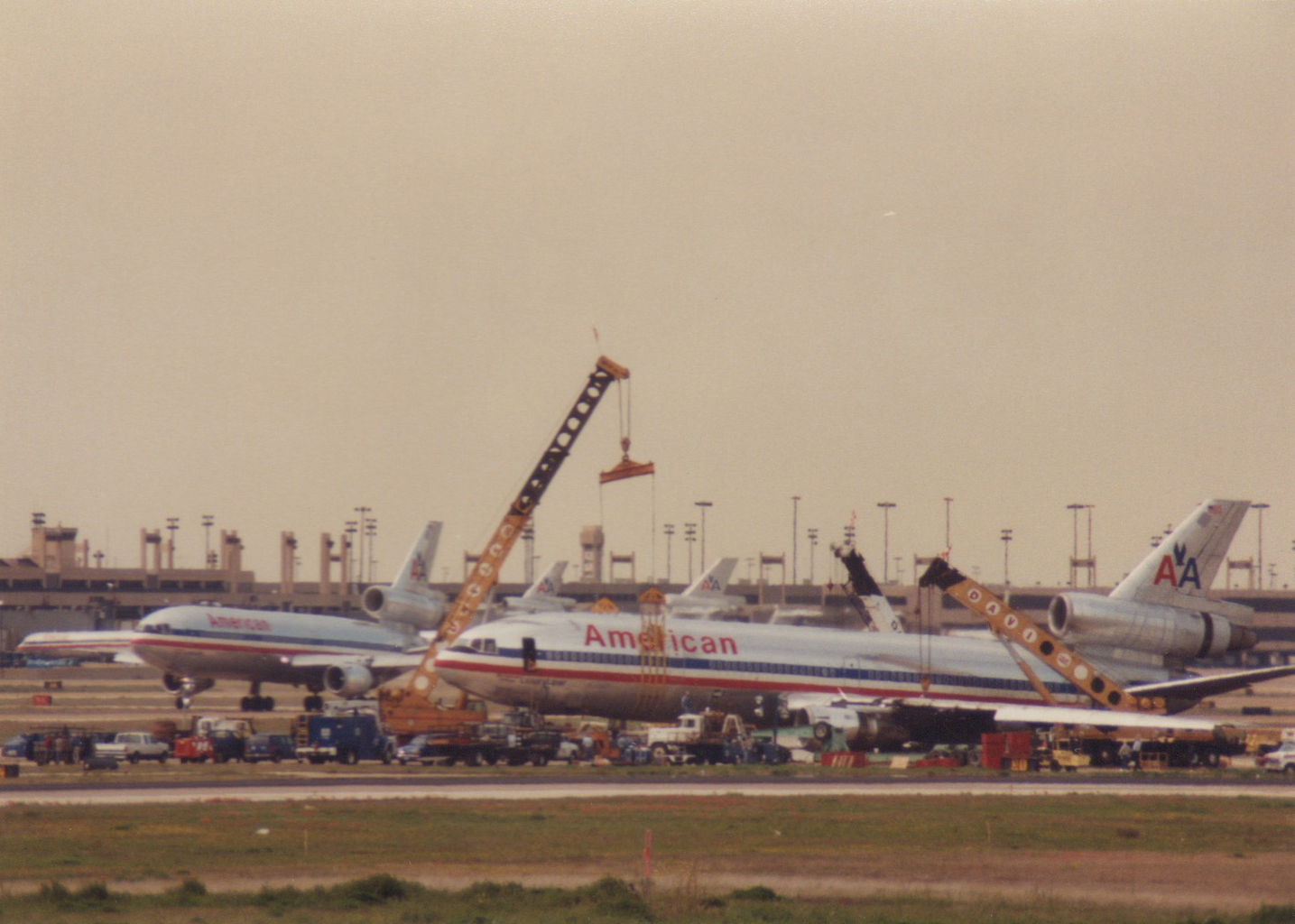
- The aircraft being recovered from the runway

Accident
- Date: April 14, 1993
- Summary: Runway excursion
- Site: Dallas Fort Worth International Airport, Dallas–Fort Worth metroplex, United States

Aircraft
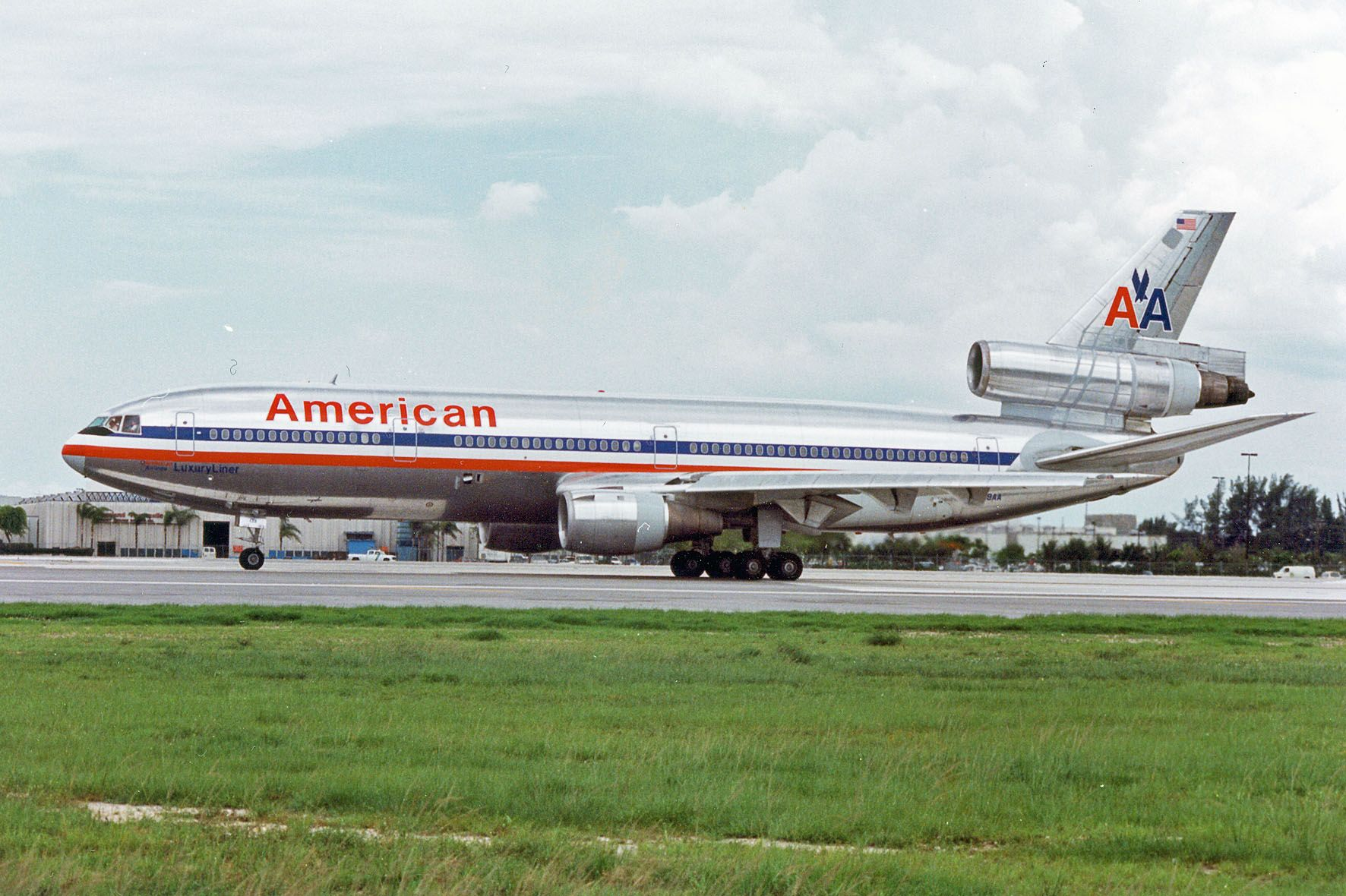
- N139AA, the aircraft involved in the accident, seen in 1992
- Aircraft type: McDonnell Douglas DC-10-30
- Operator: American Airlines
- IATA flight No.: AA102
- ICAO flight No.: AAL102
- Call sign: AMERICAN 102
- Registration: N139AA
- Flight origin: Honolulu International Airport
- Destination: Dallas Fort Worth International Airport
- Occupants: 202
- Passengers: 189
- Crew: 13
- Fatalities: 0
- Injuries: 40
- Survivors: 202

American Airlines Flight 102 was a regularly scheduled flight operated by a McDonnell Douglas DC-10 from Honolulu International Airport to Dallas Fort Worth International Airport. On 14 April 1993, upon landing, it was raining at Dallas-Ft Worth International Airport, and there were numerous thunderstorms in the area. Shortly after touchdown on runway 17L, (Note: Present-day runway 17C.) the pilot lost directional control as the aircraft began to weathervane, and it departed the right side of the runway. All 202 occupants on board survived, with two passengers suffering serious injuries during the emergency evacuation. The aircraft was badly damaged and was written off.

The National Transportation Safety Board concluded that the cause of the accident was the failure of the captain to use proper directional control technique during the landing roll.

== Background ==
=== Aircraft ===
The aircraft involved was a McDonnell Douglas DC-10-30, MSN 46711, registered as N139AA, that was manufactured by McDonnell Douglas in 1973. The aircraft logged 74831 airframe hours and 17920 takeoff and landing cycles.

=== Flight crew ===
The aircraft had a flight crew of three. The captain, 59-year-old Kenneth Kruslyak, had a total of 12,562 flight hours, 555 of which were in the DC-10. He was employed by American Airlines on August 1, 1966, and was designated as a captain in the DC-10 in November 1991. Kruslyak held an Airline Transport Pilot Certificate and was type rated in the DC-10, Boeing 727, and DC-9, with a commercial type rating in the Boeing 377. The first officer, 40-year-old David Harrell, had 4,454 flight hours with American Airlines, 554 of which were in the DC-10. The flight engineer, 60-year-old Francis Roggenbuck, held a current Flight Engineer certificate. He was employed by American Airlines in October 1955. Roggenbuck had a total of 20,000 flight hours, all of which were as a flight engineer, and 4,800 hours of which were in the DC-10.

=== Cabin crew and passengers ===
The aircraft was carrying ten cabin crew and 189 passengers.

== Crash ==
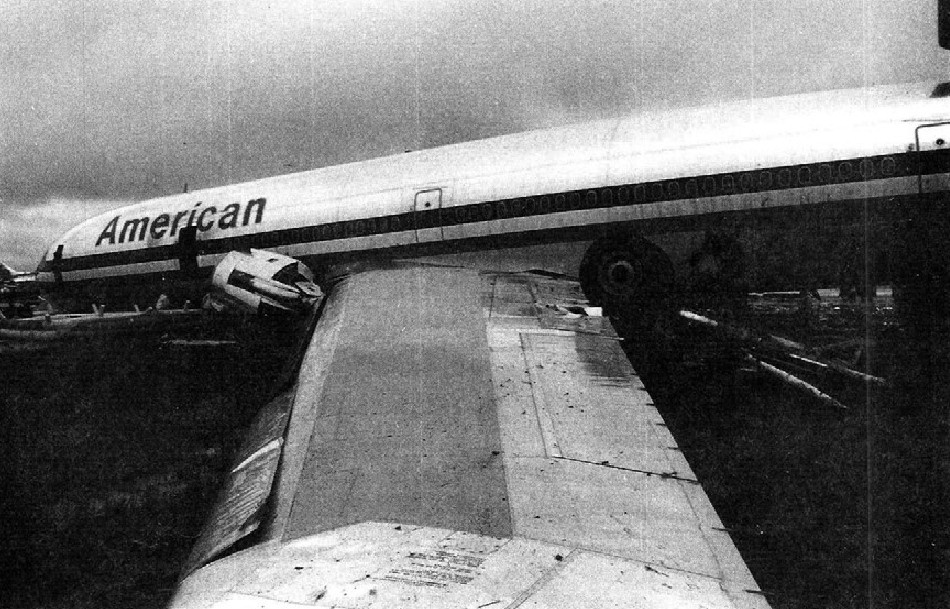
Another view of the aircraft on the runway

As the aircraft landed, it began to weathervane and departed the right side of runway 17L. The aircraft dug into deep mud, collapsing the nose landing gear, and damaging the left engine and the left wing. A small fire was quickly extinguished by firefighters who arrived from a nearby airport fire station. The aircraft came to rest along an adjacent taxiway and was steeply tilted to one side, causing some evacuation slides to deploy improperly; during the ensuing emergency evacuation, two passengers fell from the slides, suffering serious injuries. Three crew and 35 passengers suffered minor injuries in the crash and emergency evacuation.

== Investigation ==
The National Transportation Safety Board concluded that the cause of the accident was:

At the time flight AA102 landed at DFW Airport, it was raining and there were numerous thunderstorms in the area. Shortly after touchdown on runway 17L, the pilot lost directional control when the airplane began to weathervane and the captain failed to use sufficient rudder control to regain the proper ground track. The airplane eventually departed the right side of the runway. At the time of landing the wind (a cross wind) was blowing at 15 knots with gusts approximately 5 knots above the steady wind speed.

== See also ==
- List of American Airlines accidents and incidents
