= Flight 2 =

Flight 2 may refer to the following aviation accidents or incidents:

- American Airlines Flight 2, 1944 crash in Mississippi River with no survivors
- Japan Airlines Flight 2, 1968 aviation accident in California
- Northwest Airlines Flight 2, 1938 crash in Montana with no survivors
- Northwest Orient Airlines Flight 2, 1956 aircraft ditching in Puget Sound
- Trans World Airlines Flight 2, one of the flights involved in the 1956 Grand Canyon mid-air collision on 30 June 1956
- Helitech Flight 2, one of the flights involved in the 1986 Grand Canyon mid-air collision on 18 June, 1986

== Other uses ==
- Starship flight test 2, a flight of the SpaceX Starship rocket in November 2023
