= American Airlines Flight 383 =

Index of articles associated with the same flight number

Two flights named American Airlines Flight 383 (IATA: AA 383; ICAO: AAL383; AMERICAN 383) have been involved in notable aviation accidents:

- American Airlines Flight 383 (1965), crashed on approach to the Cincinnati/Northern Kentucky International Airport, leaving only 4 survivors out of the 62 onboard
- American Airlines Flight 383 (2016), suffered an uncontained engine failure and fire during takeoff at Chicago O'Hare Airport on October 28, 2016

== See also ==
- American Airlines accidents and incidents
