= Ellicott Rock Wilderness =

Wild area in Georgia, North Carolina and South Carolina

- IUCN category Ib (wilderness area)
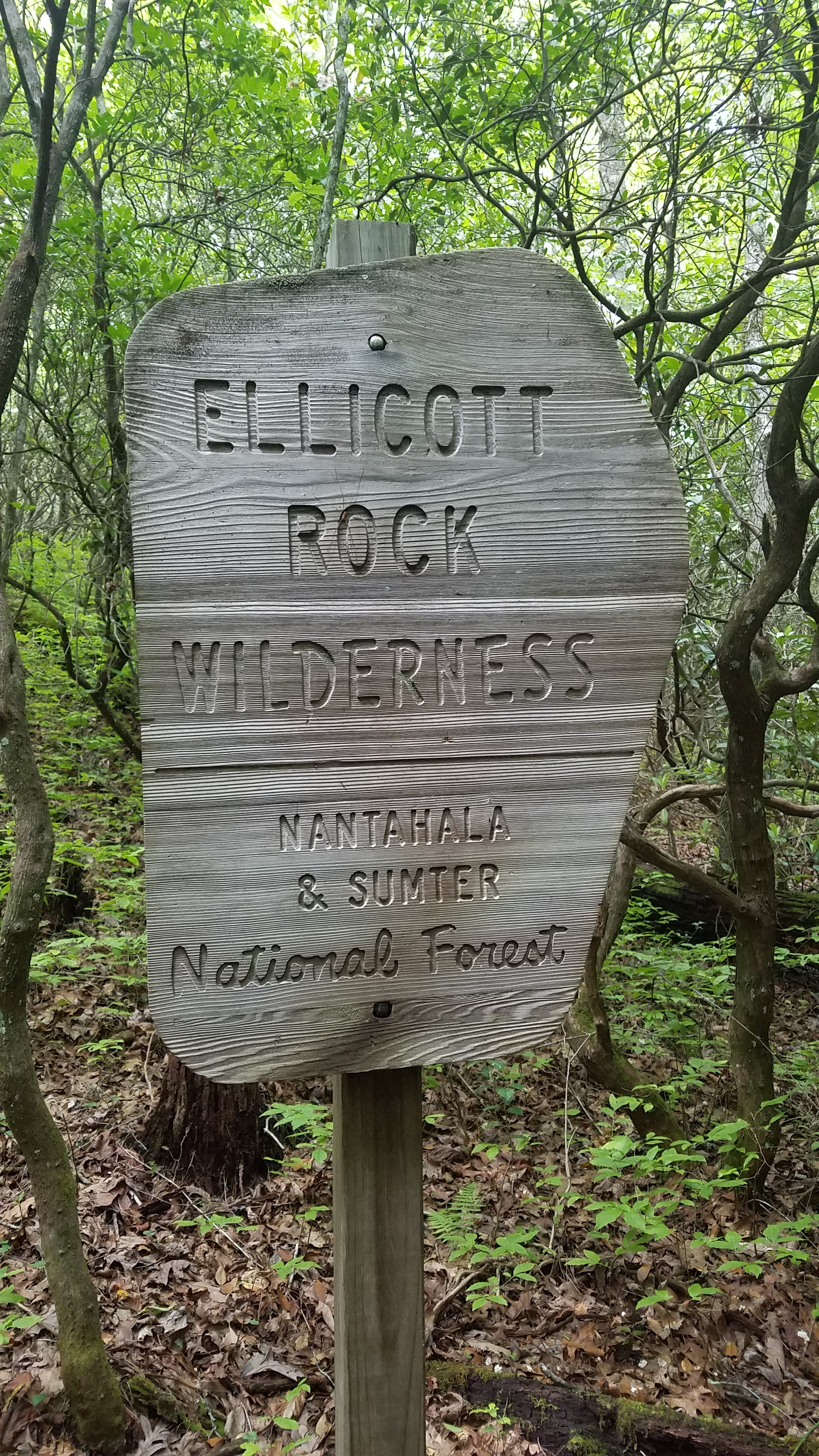
- Ellicott Rock Wilderness boundary sign along Fork Mountain Trail in South Carolina

- Location within Georgia Location within North Carolina Location within South Carolina Location within the United States
- Location: Jackson / Macon counties, North Carolina; Oconee County, South Carolina; Rabun County, Georgia USA
- Nearest city: Highlands, NC
- Coordinates: 34°59′57″N 83°05′54″W
- Area: 8,274 acres (33 km^{2})
- Established: 1975
- Governing body: U.S. Forest Service

Ellicott Rock Wilderness is a wild area lying at and around the tripoint of Georgia, North Carolina, and South Carolina, spanning 8,274 acres. It is managed by the United States Forest Service and is part of the National Wilderness Preservation System.

== History ==
The area was first identified in 1966. It was then designated by Congress in 1975 with the Eastern Wilderness Act. Additional lands were added to Ellicott Rock Wilderness in 1984 with the passing of the North Carolina Wilderness Act and the Georgia Wilderness Act, today designated wilderness totals 8,274 acres (33.48 km^{2}).

In 1979, all Forest Service land was surveyed under the Roadless Area Review and Evaluation (RARE II) and 1,982 acres (8.02 km^{2}) on the Sumter National Forest (adjacent to the existing wilderness) were classified as Roadless National Forest System land and named Ellicott Rock Extension. The Andrew Pickens Ranger district on the Sumter National Forest recommended the Ellicott Rock Extension as wilderness in 1995 in their Resource Management Plan. Although not fully designated, recommended wilderness is managed as if it were designated wilderness. In June 2017 during a land management plan revision, the Nantahala Ranger District on the Nantahala National Forest added 824 acres (3.33 km^{2}) of proposed wilderness, currently called Ellicott Rock West Extension.

=== Naming ===
Ellicott Rock Wilderness is named for “Ellicott's Rock”, a rock where all three states come together, on the east bank of the Chattooga Wild and Scenic River on which surveyor Major Andrew Ellicott chiseled a mark in 1811 to determine the border between Georgia and North Carolina. Major Ellicott, a well-respected, sought-after surveyor, astronomer, and mathematician, was hired by the state of Georgia to ground-truth the 35th parallel and settle a border dispute between Georgia and North Carolina. The task proved long and arduous, saw difficult terrain, and the location was not accessible by horse. On December 26 with severe weather and limited food, Major Ellicott calculated the 35th parallel and inscribed the letters "N-G" on a rock along the Chattooga Wild and Scenic River. This put the Georgia-North Carolina border approximately 18 miles south of what Georgia claimed at the time. Due to Georgia's unfavorable results, Major Ellicott went unpaid for over a year and was ultimately paid a tiny fraction of the salary promised. Two years later, a group of commissioners representing both North and South Carolina set out to verify the location of Ellicott's Rock. The commissioners carved a second rock (approximately 10 feet north of Ellicott's Rock) with the inscription "Lat 35 AD 1813 NC + SC" to mark where the North Carolina and South Carolina state lines joined. This second rock is commonly referred to as Ellicott's Rock though more accurately it is named Commissioner's Rock. Commissioner's Rock was listed in the National Register of Historic Places on July 24, 1973.

== Geography ==
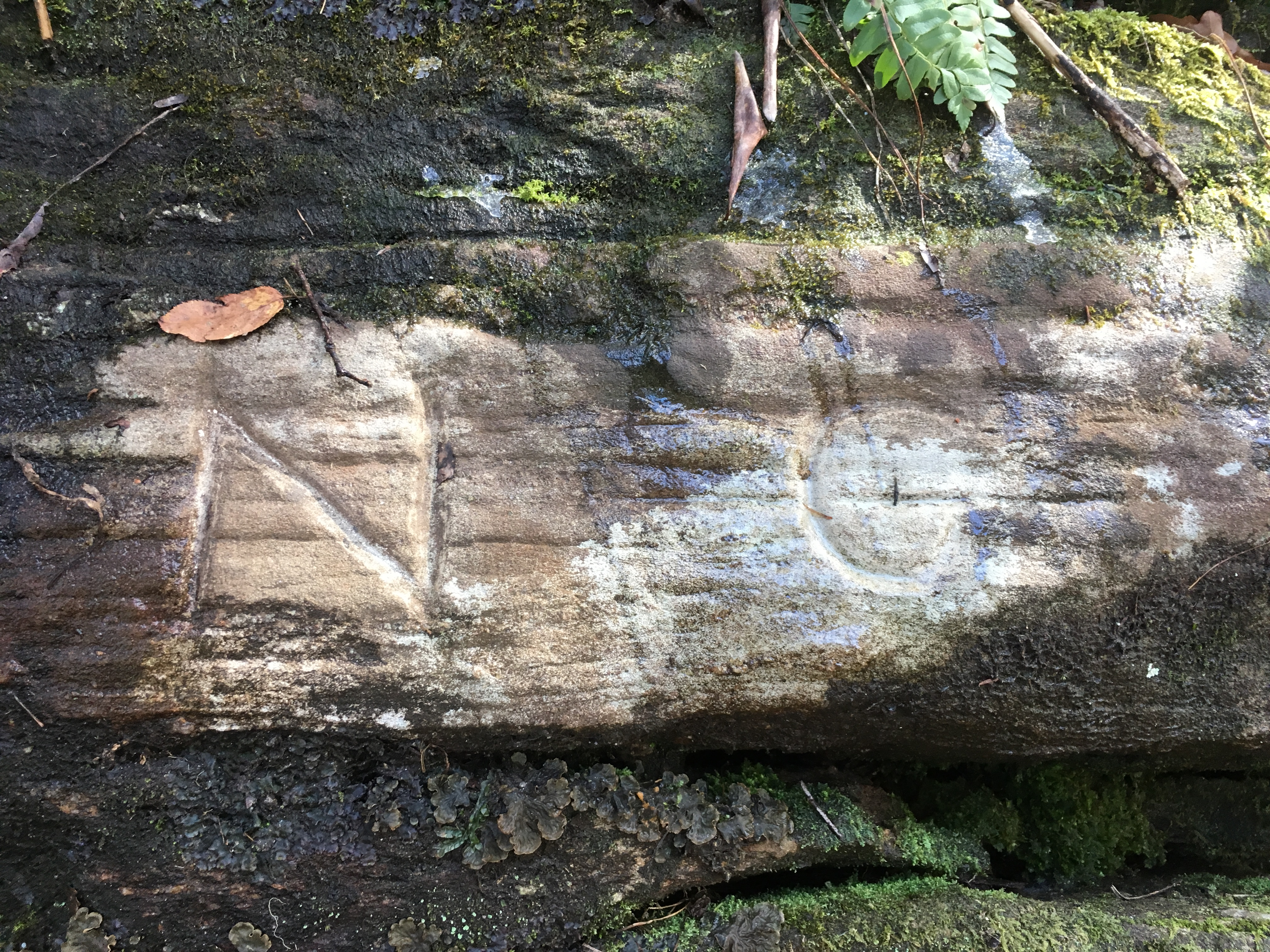
Ellicott's Rock

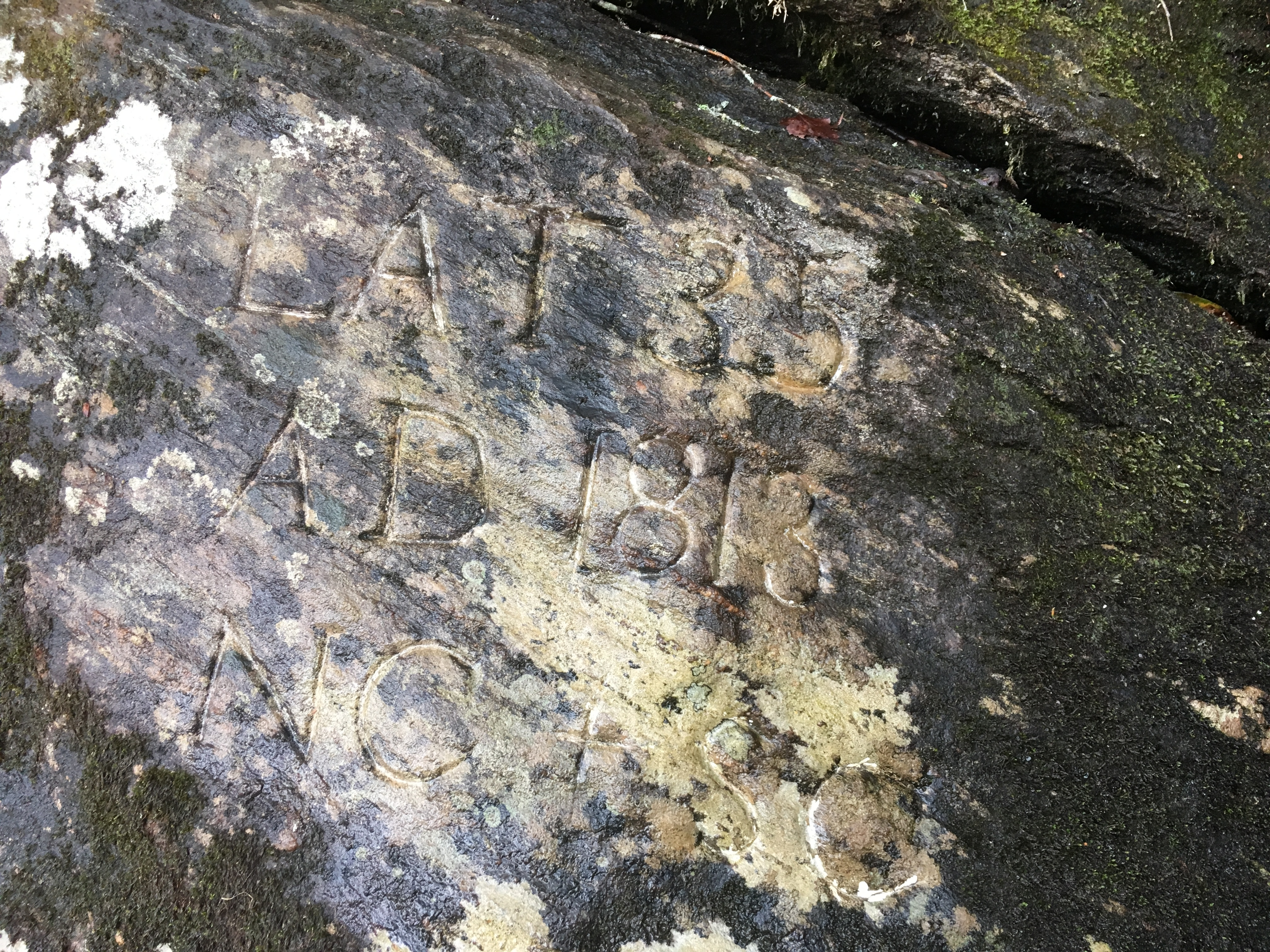
Commissioner's Rock

Ellicott Rock Wilderness is the only wilderness that straddles three states, with boundaries located around the point at which Georgia, North Carolina, and South Carolina come together. Ellicott Rock Wilderness also spans three National Forests. Sumter National Forest in South Carolina is responsible for 2,859 acres (11.57 km^{2}), receives the majority of recreation in the wilderness, and is also the lead manager of Ellicott Rock Wilderness. Nantahala National Forest in North Carolina is responsible for most of the wilderness at 3,394 acres (13.74 km^{2}) and the Chattahoochee National Forest in Georgia manages 2,021 acres (8.18 km^{2}) of the wilderness.

=== Access ===
Three roads provide access to the proposed "Ellicott Rock Addition": Forest Development Road 646 and County Road 122 from the south, and County Road 121 from the west.

Hiking is the only way one can access the interior of the park.

==== Trails ====
The wilderness contains six trails:

- Chattooga River Trail
- Ellicott Rock Trail
- Bad Creek Trail
- Sloan Bridge Trail
- East Fork Trail
- Foothills Trail

=== Flora and fauna ===
The "Ellicott Rock Addition"'s soils are of the Tusquitee-Edneyville-Porters soil group. The area's plant life includes white oak, red oak, hickory, upland hardwood, white pine, and cove hardwoods. Wildlife in the area include migratory songbirds, deer, turkeys, bears, trout, box turtles, common garter snakes, and timber rattlesnakes.

=== Chattooga Wild and Scenic River ===
One notable landmark in the Ellicott Rock Wilderness is the Chattooga Wild and Scenic River, which runs runs from 2,381 feet to 2,100 feet. The Chattooga Wild and Scenic River bisects Ellicott Rock Wilderness, running through the heart of the wilderness. Made famous more than 45 years ago from the book and later movie, Deliverance, the Chattooga Wild and Scenic River is a prized feature among visitors to Ellicott Rock Wilderness. Many people can be found along the River enjoying the water, fishing, camping, and boating. There is a strong cultural tie to recreation uses along this river and it maintains a special place in the hearts of its frequent visitors.

=== Mountains, terrains, and waterfalls ===
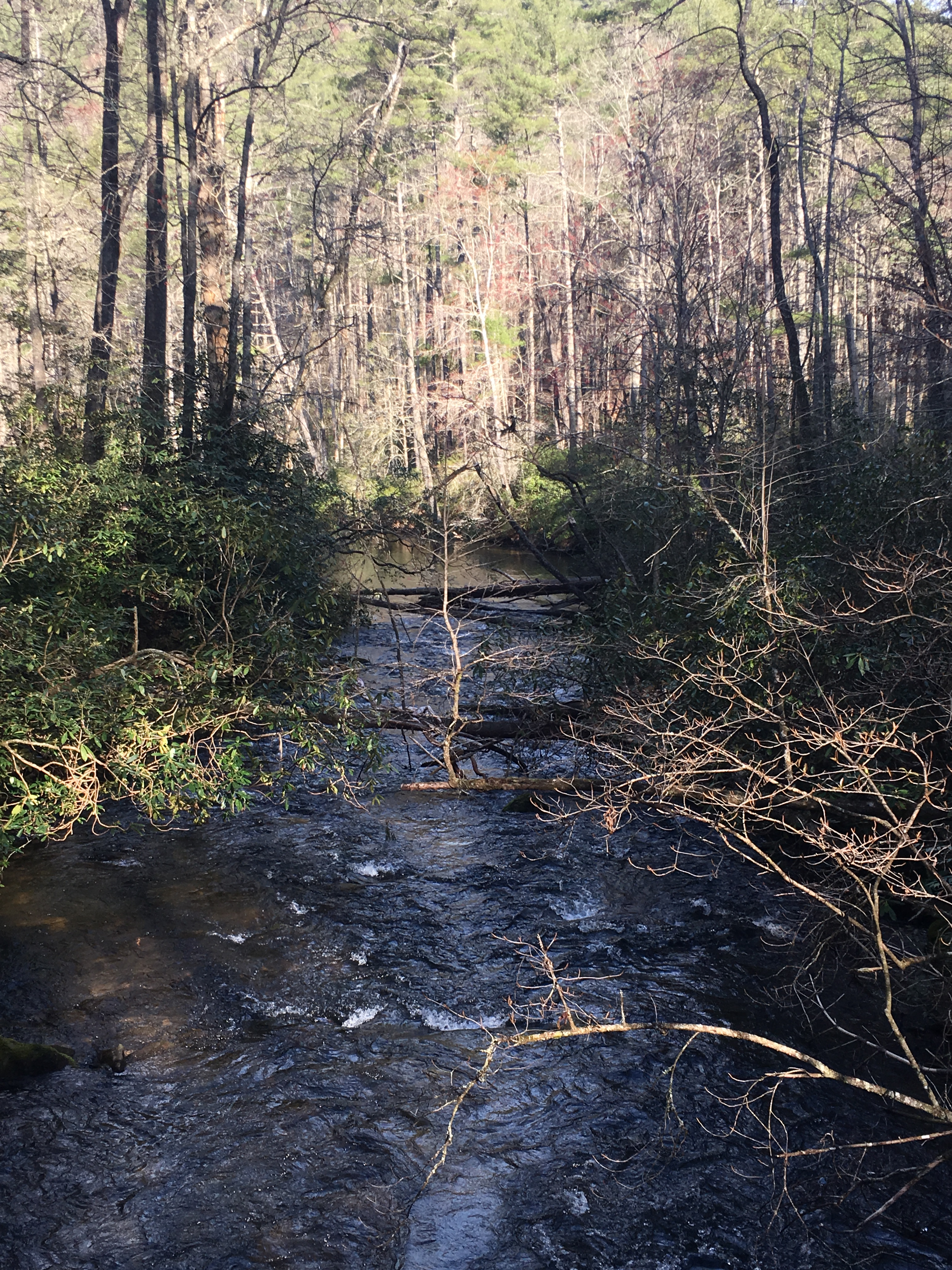
Chattooga Wild and Scenic River

Ellicott Rock Wilderness is located in the southern tip of the Blue Ridge Mountains, a sub-mountain range of the Appalachian Mountains. It has a temperate climate with an average rainfall of 80 inches per year creating a dense forest with steep, rugged terrain. Embedded throughout the wilderness landscape are a variety of hardwood trees white pines, and hemlocks with water sources including a couple waterfalls. One waterfall, Spoonauger Falls, is located on the Chattooga River Trail, a short quarter-mile hike from the trailhead located on Burrell's Ford road. The Wilderness is home to Glade Mountain of Georgia standing at an elevation of 3,672-foot (1,119 m) and Fork Mountain of South Carolina at an elevation of 3,294-foot (1,004 m). The watershed surrounding the Chattooga Wild and Scenic River is one of the most biologically diverse in the country. The area contains a variety of wild flora and fauna.

=== Recreation ===
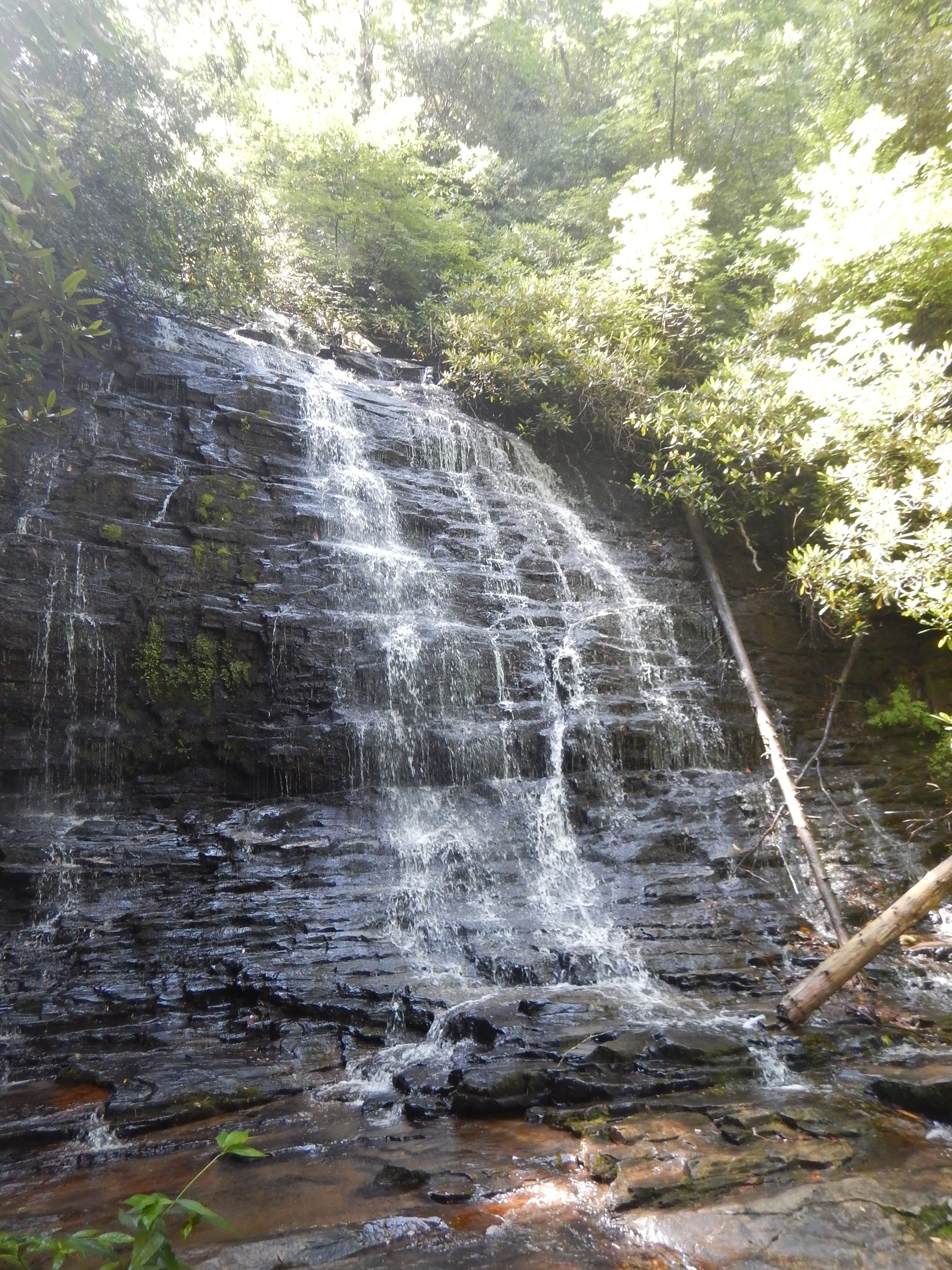
Spoonauger Falls

A variety of recreation occurs in Ellicott Rock Wilderness including hiking, camping, backpacking, fishing, hunting, kayaking, and orienteering. The Wilderness supports approximately 18 miles of designated terrestrial trails. South Carolina trails include Chattooga River Trail, East Fork Trail, Foothills Connector Trail, and a majority of the Fork Mountain Trail. North Carolina has one trail, Ellicott Rock Trail, with two trailheads along Bull Creek Road and a big river crossing in the middle. Georgia does not maintain any trails. While there are no officially designated campsites in Ellicott Rock Wilderness yet, many unofficial campsites occur along the trails, particularly along the Chattooga River trail. Unofficial campsites are primitive with no amenities.

== See also ==
- List of U.S. Wilderness Areas
- Wilderness Act
