= American Airlines Flight 157 =

1949 aviation accident

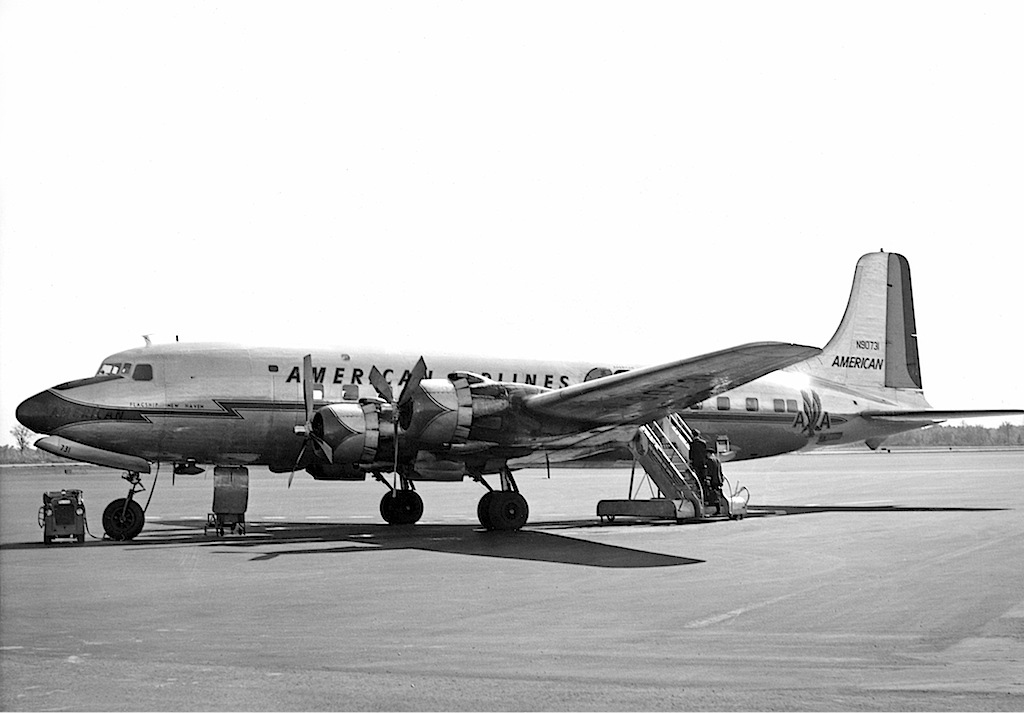
- An American Airlines Douglas DC-6, similar to the aircraft involved in the crash.

Accident
- Date: November 29, 1949
- Summary: Engine failure, pilot error
- Site: Love Field, Dallas, Texas; 32°50′53″N 96°51′04″W

Aircraft
- Aircraft type: Douglas DC-6
- Aircraft name: Flagship South Carolina
- Operator: American Airlines
- Registration: N90728
- Flight origin: LaGuardia Airport, New York City
- Stopover: Love Field, Dallas, Texas
- Destination: Mexico City Int'l Airport
- Occupants: 46
- Passengers: 41
- Crew: 5
- Fatalities: 28
- Injuries: 16
- Survivors: 18

American Airlines Flight 157, a Douglas DC-6, departed on November 29, 1949, from New York City bound for Mexico City with 46 passengers and crew. After one engine failed in mid-flight, a series of critical mistakes by the flight crew caused the pilot to lose control of the plane during the final approach to a routine stopover at Love Field in Dallas, Texas. The airliner slid off the runway and struck a parked airplane, a hangar, and a flight school before crashing into a business across from the airport. 26 passengers and two flight attendants died. The pilot, co-pilot, flight engineer, and 15 passengers survived.

== Flight history ==
The American Airlines DC-6, carrying a registration number of N90728 and the name Flagship South Carolina, had taken off from LaGuardia Airport in New York City bound for Mexico City with intermediate stopovers at Washington National Airport and Dallas Love Field. After the stop in Washington D.C., the flight was carrying 41 passengers and 5 crew members: Captain Laurens "Tommy" Claude, First Officer Robert Lewis and Flight Engineer William S. Forbes.

The flight was uneventful until the No. 1 engine, the outboard engine on the left wing, began backfiring and running roughly as the airplane neared Nashville, Tennessee. After reducing power and attempting corrective measures, the flight crew shut down the engine and feathered the propeller near Altheimer, Arkansas. Engine failures were considered fairly routine events on piston-engined airliners in the 1940s, so the crew elected to continue the flight to Dallas, and Captain Claude announced to the passengers that they would switch to another airplane upon arrival.

== Crash ==
At 5:25 am, as they approached Dallas airspace, the crew of Flight 157 alerted air traffic control that they were flying on three engines. The flight was given permission to enter the traffic pattern at Love Field at 5:36 am. Weather in Dallas was clear, with visibility of 15 miles (24 km), and no other air traffic was reported in the area. Captain Claude ordered the crew to lower the flaps and landing gear. At 5:45 am, the pilot made a right-hand turn to land on Runway 36, but the airplane came out of the turn slightly to the left of the runway. An "S"-turn was initiated to align the DC-6 with the runway centerline.

The plane suddenly shook and its airspeed dropped precipitously. The left wing dropped and the plane began to turn to the left. Flight Engineer Forbes noted that the fuel flow meter was not indicating any flow to the No. 4 engine. Captain Claude quickly applied full throttle and ordered Forbes to apply the booster pump, which increases the fuel flow to the engines in emergencies. The captain applied full right aileron in an attempt to raise the dropping left wing, and ordered First Officer Lewis to raise the flaps and landing gear, intending to circle the airport and attempt another landing (known as a go-around). Lewis raised the landing gear but did not raise the flaps, stating later that he "was afraid" to raise them because he assumed that the airplane would immediately stall if he complied. Lewis noticed that the No. 4 engine's fuel pressure was zero and its RPM was dropping, and he feathered the prop, hoping that the resulting reduction in drag would help the airplane accelerate and climb. However, with the flaps down and only two of the four engines working, the DC-6 did not accelerate; it continued to drop, headed on a path crossing Runway 36 approximately 40 degrees to the left. The captain raised the airplane's nose in a futile attempt to climb, but the airliner stalled instead, striking the runway tail-first.

The airplane slid off the left side of the runway, bouncing into the air as it struck a parked airplane (identified in newspaper reports only as "an old Army Air Force trainer") and set it ablaze. The airliner's left wing cut through the wall of a hangar, causing the roof to partially collapse, and then exploded into flames as its right wing tore through the Dallas Aviation School. The craft then struck the ground, broke into several pieces, and turned sideways as it slid across Love Field Drive, finally coming to rest after plowing into a building owned by the American Magnaflux Corporation.

== Aftermath ==
The 15 surviving passengers escaped in the initial seconds after the crash, scrambling through a gaping hole in the forward fuselage and through the emergency exit doors over the wings. The cockpit section of the aircraft had separated from the fuselage, helping the flight crew to escape the fire. Most survivors escaped with only minor injuries.

Only one passenger would die of his injuries after managing to escape from the burning aircraft. The remaining 25 passengers and two flight attendants were trapped in the wreck as the flames quickly grew too intense to allow any rescue attempts. Firefighters fought the massive blaze for at least 30 minutes before the wreckage could be approached, by which time many of the victims were charred beyond recognition. The Dallas Aviation School and American Magnaflux buildings were almost destroyed and the hangar was extensively damaged. The parked airplane that was struck by the DC-6 burned so extensively that little remained of it afterwards.

== Investigation ==
The Civil Aeronautics Board (CAB) held a hearing in Dallas in December 1949 to investigate the causes of the accident. During the hearings, it was revealed that neither Claude nor Forbes knew that Lewis had feathered the No. 4 propeller; Claude did not find out until hearing Lewis' statement being read to the CAB.

After investigating the remains of the aircraft, conducting flight tests to replicate the accident scenario, and completing the hearing, the CAB concluded in August 1950 that the probable cause of the accident was "the faulty execution of an engine-out approach." A series of significant mishaps by the crew contributed to the final outcome:

- The captain failed to align the aircraft with the runway centerline after the final turn.
- After realizing the misalignment, the captain attempted to correct it with a risky "S"-turn at low altitude. There is little room for error if a problem arises during this maneuver because as the angle of the bank increases, so does the probability of stalling the airplane.
- The crew made no attempt to balance the airplane's fuel load after the No. 1 engine failed. The DC-6 is equipped with four main fuel tanks that serve individual engines, while a network of valves allow fuel to be transferred from one engine's tank to feed other engines. The crew did not cross feed fuel from the tank serving the failed engine to balance the plane's weight as recommended in the flight operations manual. Flight 157 had flown for almost three hours with the No. 1 engine out, and the CAB concluded that the No. 1 main fuel tank was holding about 1,400 lbs (635 kg) more gasoline than the other three main tanks when the plane arrived at Love Field. The investigators primarily attributed the left wing's sharp drop to the excessive weight of the fuel at its outboard end.
- The captain applied excessive rudder during the "S"-turn, causing a condition known in aviation terminology as a skid. This maneuver would have caused the plane's airspeed to drop, and according to the CAB findings, it caused the fuel in the No. 4 main tank to slosh away from the fuel outlet, lowering the engine's fuel pressure.
- The captain's application of full throttle to both right-hand engines caused to airplane to turn further to the left due to the relative lack of thrust from the single functioning left-hand engine. This exacerbated his loss of directional control.
- The first officer disobeyed the captain's order to raise the wing flaps, and did not tell the captain.
- The first officer misinterpreted the No. 4 engine's fuel pressure drop as a sign of incipient engine failure and feathered the prop. However, the CAB partially exonerated Lewis for this act, concluding that the craft was so close to the ground at that point that his mistake probably had little influence on the final outcome.
- Excessive elevator input by the captain caused the aircraft to stall.

The CAB concluded that the accident could have been avoided if the crew had held the plane straight and level when the misalignment was first noticed, then raised the flaps, climbed to a safe altitude, circled the airport, and attempted another landing. The CAB concluded that there were no factors present that would compel the crew to land immediately despite the sloppy approach, such as rapidly deteriorating weather or a shortage of fuel.

== See also ==
- Aviation safety
- American Airlines accidents and incidents
- List of accidents and incidents involving commercial aircraft
