= Earl Leland Smith =

Earl Leland "Smitty" Smith (1895–1973) worked in aviation from his first flight in 1921 to his retirement in 1952. He worked as a pilot, flight instructor, and mechanic for numerous aviation companies throughout his career. He was also a tester for the National Bureau of Standards and an investigator for the Civil Aeronautics Board. Smith died in November 1973.

Smith is best known for commandeering the first rail-air flight across the US. He flew over mountains, which was a path deemed dangerous at the time, to demonstrate that a flight-rail path from East to West Coasts was possible.

He partnered with Bud Baker, another pilot, and started an airline: "It was in August 1929 that Bud and I started what is now United Air Lines."

His first accident occurred on September 1, 1931. Skillful at both flying and repairing planes, Smith was a pilot for major airlines like Eastern Air Transport and Condor Peruana de Aviniacion and a founder of his own mechanic shop in the early 1930s.

== Professional life ==
Smith began his aviation career in the early 1910s as a mechanic for Tony Jannus.

Smith began as a flight instructor in 1924, after founding his own company in Springfield, Illinois. In 1925, Smith moved to Marshall, Missouri, and became a mechanic specializing in motor maintenance while continuing his work as a flight and rigging instructor with the Nicholas-Beazley Airplane Company. From 1928 to 1929, Smith worked for the Newark Flying Service in New Jersey, where he restored airplanes.

=== Aviation reporting ===
From 1941 to 1952, Smith worked as a safety investigator for the Civil Aeronautics Board; he served in Detroit for five years and in Minneapolis for six years. During his time as a safety investigator, he testified in several hearings, including as an expert in a Montana 1942 accident report, stating how several factors combined—rain, wind, slag piles, and runway materials—could have caused the accident.

As an investigator, Smith flew from Detroit, Michigan, to Trammel, Kentucky, to investigate the crash scene of an American Airlines DC-3 airplane on June 28, 1943. The pilot of the crashed plane was veteran pilot B. A. Carpenter; four crew members and 16 passengers died, and two individuals survived.

Smith contributed records from his career in scrapbooks to the Smithsonian Institution in 1969.

=== Flying ===
During World War I, Smith applied for and was rejected by the U.S. Army Air Corp (later the U.S. Air Force) and instead began private flying lessons.

On June 11, 1921, Smith flew his first solo flight and began his career as a pilot in commercial aviation soon after.

In 1929, Smith was hired to work for Clifford Ball, Inc., assigned to fly passengers over mountains from Cleveland to Washington, D.C. Later that same year, Smith piloted for Universal Airlines in the first national rail-air flight on June 14, 1929. Although his flight paths were declared dangerous, his national rail-air flights as well as his flights for Universal Airlines crossed the Appalachian mountains. Smith described his flights over the Appalachian mountains as a "zany and hare-brained" idea that "led directly to the opening of new vistas of vast promise for the aviation industry."

In 1931, he experienced his first plane accident in Baltimore, Maryland, resulting in a crushed vertebra. After more than 2 months of recovery, "[Smith] continued flying for Ludington Airline and worked with the company until February 1933."

Smith's career in aviation brought him in contact with famous pilots such as Charles Lindbergh and Amelia Earhart. He roomed with Charles Lindbergh in 1924, when both were in St. Louis, Missouri, for air races, and he worked with Earheart when both were employed by Ludington Lines.

In 1935, the Bureau of Air Commerce granted Smith a certificate to run an aircraft repair shop without providing plans to the Department of Commerce. In 1938, Smith’s repair shop, located in Fairfax County, Virginia, was robbed of $500 worth of aircraft equipment (equivalent to $11,200 in 2024).

Flying Assignments

During his flying career, Smith worked for the following companies (as noted in the Smith archives at The University of Texas at Dallas):

- Earl L. Smith's private flying service (1924–1925, 1927)
- Nicholas-Beazley Airplane Co. (1927–1928)
- Newark Flying Service (1928)
- Universal Airlines, Clifford Ball, Inc. (1929)
- Ludington Airline (1930–1933)
- Eastern Air Transport (1933)
- Condór Peruana de Aviación, Beckman Flying Service (1934)
- United States Airmail Service (1937)

== Personal life ==
Earl Leland Smith was married twice—first to Sarah E. Lammy Fitzgerald and then to Helen E. Koch Smith. When married to his first wife, Smith fathered one son (Paul Leo "Smitty" Smith) in 1919 and one daughter (Imogene M. Smith Hornback) in 1927.
