= Trammel, Kentucky =

Unincorporated community in Kentucky, United States

Trammel
- Unincorporated community
- Location within the state of Kentucky Trammel (the United States)
- Coordinates: 36°47′07″N 86°21′12″W
- Country: United States
- State: Kentucky
- County: Allen
- Elevation: 738 ft (225 m)
- Time zone: UTC−6 (CST)
  - Summer (DST): UTC−5 (CDT)
- ZIP codes: 42164
- GNIS feature ID: 509228

Trammel is a rural unincorporated community in western Allen County, Kentucky, United States.

== History ==
On July 28, 1943, American Airlines Flight 63 (Flagship Ohio) crashed on the Louisville-Nashville sector about 1.6 miles (2.6 km) west of Trammel. The aircraft descended from 200 feet (61 m) until it struck trees, then slid across an open field and stopped in an upright position. It was caused by a loss of control from severe turbulence and downdrafts of a nearby thunderstorm. Twenty people on board lost their lives, while only two survived. Aircraft mechanic and instructor Earl Leland Smith flew to the area from Detroit to investigate the scene of the accident and identified the pilot of the aircraft as B.A. Carpenter.
