= American Airlines Flight 63 (October 1943) =

October 1943 plane crash in Tennessee, US

Flagship Missouri
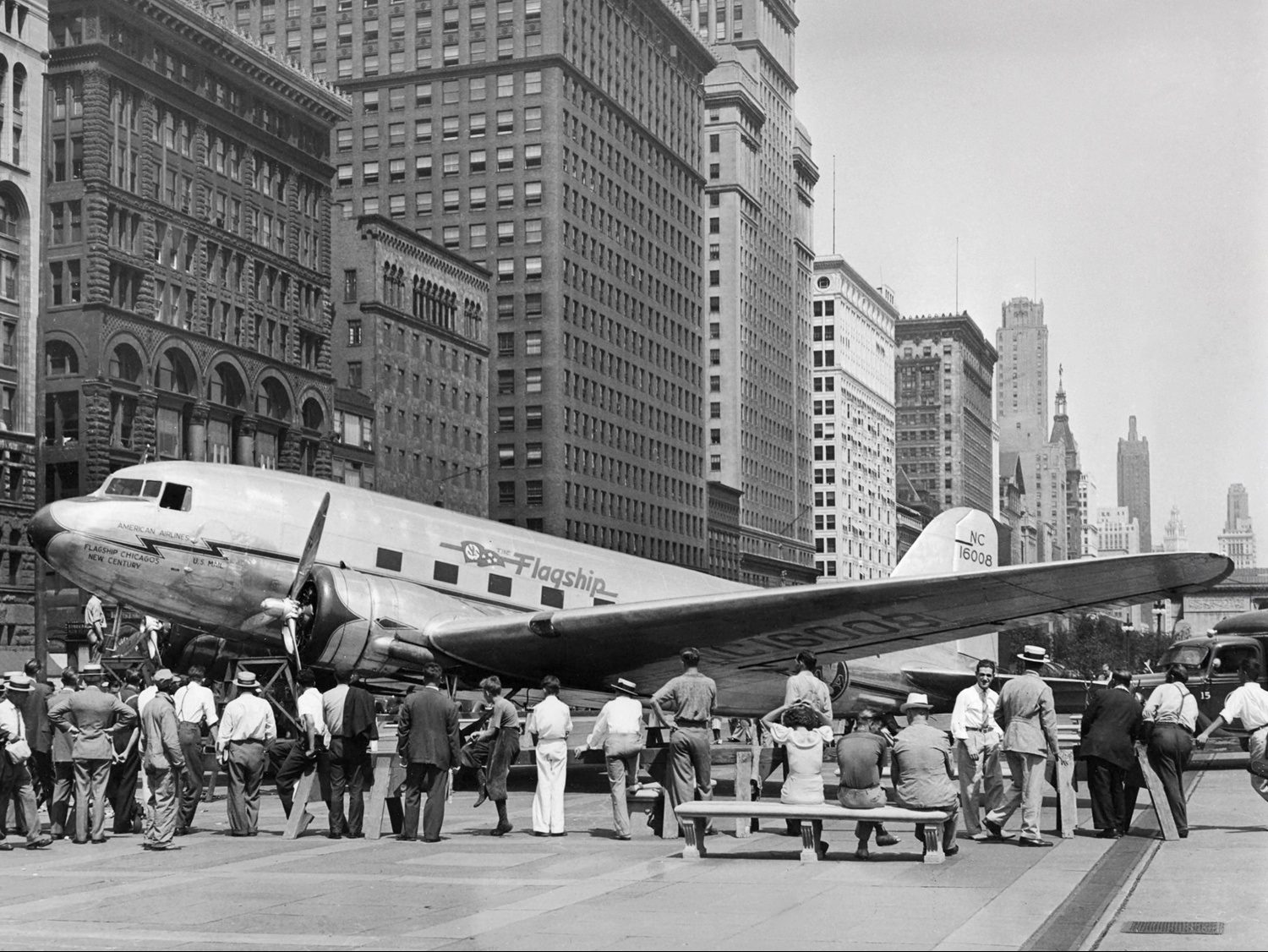
- NC16008, the aircraft involved in the accident

Accident
- Date: October 15, 1943
- Summary: Controlled flight into terrain due to icing
- Site: Centerville, Tennessee; 35°47′18″N 87°27′21″W

Aircraft
- Aircraft type: Douglas DC-3-178
- Aircraft name: Flagship Missouri
- Operator: American Airlines
- Registration: NC16008
- Flight origin: Cleveland, Ohio
- 1st stopover: Columbus, Ohio
- 2nd stopover: Dayton, Ohio
- 3rd stopover: Cincinnati, Ohio
- 4th stopover: Louisville, Kentucky
- Last stopover: Nashville, Tennessee
- Destination: Memphis, Tennessee
- Occupants: 11
- Passengers: 8
- Crew: 3
- Fatalities: 11
- Survivors: 0

American Airlines Flight 63 was an American Airlines Douglas DC-3 nicknamed the Flagship Missouri that crashed on October 15, 1943, near Centerville, Tennessee, after ice formed on its wings and propeller. All eight passengers and three crewmembers died. This was the second fatal crash of an aircraft designated Flight 63, occurring 2 1/2 months after the crash of the Flagship Missouri’s sister ship, the Flagship Ohio.

== Flight history ==
American Airlines Flight 63 serviced a 6-leg domestic passenger service between Cleveland, Ohio, and Memphis, Tennessee. The full routing of the flight was Cleveland-Columbus-Dayton-Cincinnati-Louisville-Nashville-Memphis. Up until July 28, 1943, this route was serviced by the Flagship Missouri's sister ship, the Flagship Ohio. The Flagship Ohio was lost on the Louisville-Nashville leg of the flight, when the severe downdrafts of a nearby thunderstorm forced the DC-3 to crash into a field near Trammel, Kentucky.

After the loss of the Flagship Ohio, the Flagship Missouri covered Flight 63. The Flagship Missouri was a DC-3 built by the Douglas Aircraft Company for American Airlines. It had been in service for seven years, since 1936, and had logged a total of 17,774 hours of flight time at the time of the crash. The three crewmembers were Captain Dale F. Dryer, pilot, First Officer W. J. Brand, and one stewardess.

== Crash ==
Flight 63 departed from Cleveland, Ohio, at 5:56 pm, 17 minutes behind schedule. The stops at Columbus, Dayton, Cincinnati, and Louisville were also delayed. By the time the flight departed Nashville, it was running 1 hour, 38 minutes late.

Departure from Nashville proceeded normally, and the pilot radioed to air traffic control (ATC) that he had reached an altitude of 6,000 feet (1,800 m) at 10:59 PM. At 11:06 PM, the flight requested and received permission from Nashville ATC to climb to 8,000 feet (2,400 m). Ice which had formed on the wings and propellers of the aircraft made it impossible for the aircraft to maintain altitude. The plane gradually lost altitude until it crashed into a forested hill that rose up 75 feet (23 m) above the surrounding terrain.

Eyewitnesses told reporters that the plane "circled desperately" in search of a safe landing place before plummeting into a deep gulch. Local woodsmen observed the plane's landing attempts and later heard the crash, but were unable to summon help or report it due to the lack of telephones in the area. The wreckage was discovered the following morning by woodcutter John Durison.

The Civil Aeronautics Board investigated the crash and determined that ice that had formed on the propeller or wings made it impossible for the pilot to control the altitude of the aircraft.

Inability of the aircraft to gain or maintain altitude due to carburetor ice or propeller ice or wing ice of some combination of these icing conditions while over terrain and in weather unsuitable for an emergency landing.... Weather conditions which, had their nature been anticipated, should have precluded the dispatch of the flight in an aircraft not equipped with wing or propeller deicing equipment.

— Civil Aeronautics Board, CAB File No. 4889-43

The ten passengers included two captains and an aviation cadet, as well as a Texan and four Tennessee residents.

== See also ==
- American Airlines
- American Airlines Flight 63 (Flagship Ohio)
- Air Florida Flight 90 - another crash caused by icing
- American Airlines accidents and incidents
- List of accidents and incidents involving commercial aircraft
