= American Airlines Flight 2207 =

1946 aviation accident

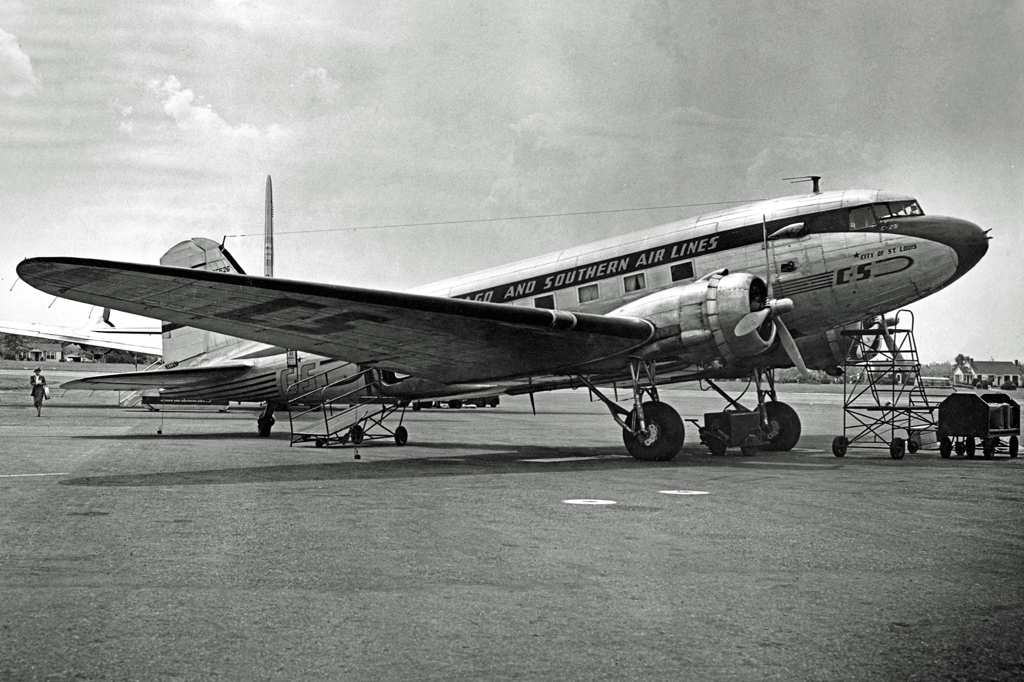
- A Chicago and Southern Air Lines DC-3, similar to the aircraft involved in the accident

Accident
- Date: December 28, 1946
- Summary: Unexplained fuel starvation, CFIT
- Site: Near Michigan City, Indiana, United States; 41°44′42″N 86°48′39″W

Aircraft
- Aircraft type: Douglas C-50A
- Operator: American Airlines
- Registration: NC15577
- Flight origin: Buffalo, New York
- Stopover: Detroit, Michigan
- Destination: Chicago, Illinois
- Occupants: 21
- Passengers: 18
- Crew: 3
- Fatalities: 2
- Injuries: 19
- Survivors: 19

The crash of American Airlines Flight 2207 was an accident involving a Douglas C-50A of the US airline American Airlines near Michigan City, Indiana, United States, on December 28, 1946, killing both pilots while the other crew member and 18 passengers survived with various injuries.

== Accident ==
Having originated in Buffalo, New York, United States, Flight 2207 took off from an undefined airport in Detroit, Michigan, United States on a scheduled flight to Chicago, Illinois, United States carrying 3 crew and 18 passengers, including Captain Frank Mapes Ham Jr. and First Officer Harman Edwin Ring on December 28, 1946, at 07:48, which was six minutes behind the scheduled takeoff time. At 08:40, Chicago ATC instructed the flight to climb to an altitude of 4,000 ft (1,219 m), which it was ordered to maintain until the flight was 10 minutes past South Bend, Indiana.

However at 09:18 the pilots reported to Air traffic control that both engines had shut down and the aircraft had descended to an altitude of 900 ft (274 m). Air traffic control at Chicago suggested that the flight should return to land at South Bend, but the pilots opted to try an emergency landing at Michigan City, Indiana instead. Unfortunately the aircraft had lost too much altitude to safely make it to the runway and crashed near Michigan City at 09:19. Both pilots were killed in the crash while the remaining crew member as well as all 18 passengers survived the crash with various injuries.

== Aircraft ==
The Douglas DC-3 C-50A involved, NC15577 (msn 4805) was built in 1941 and was used by American Airlines during its final flight.

External videos
- The aircraft involved in the accident at Los Angeles Airport in 1946 on YouTube

== Aftermath ==
The aircraft was damaged beyond repair in the crash, injuring nearly all 19 survivors while killing both pilots. An investigation of the accident determined that fuel starvation led to the failure of both engines which then started to accumulate carburetor ice. The exact reason for the fuel starvation could not be determined.
