= Glade Mountain =

Mountain in the United States

Coordinates: 34°59′48″N 83°08′03″W

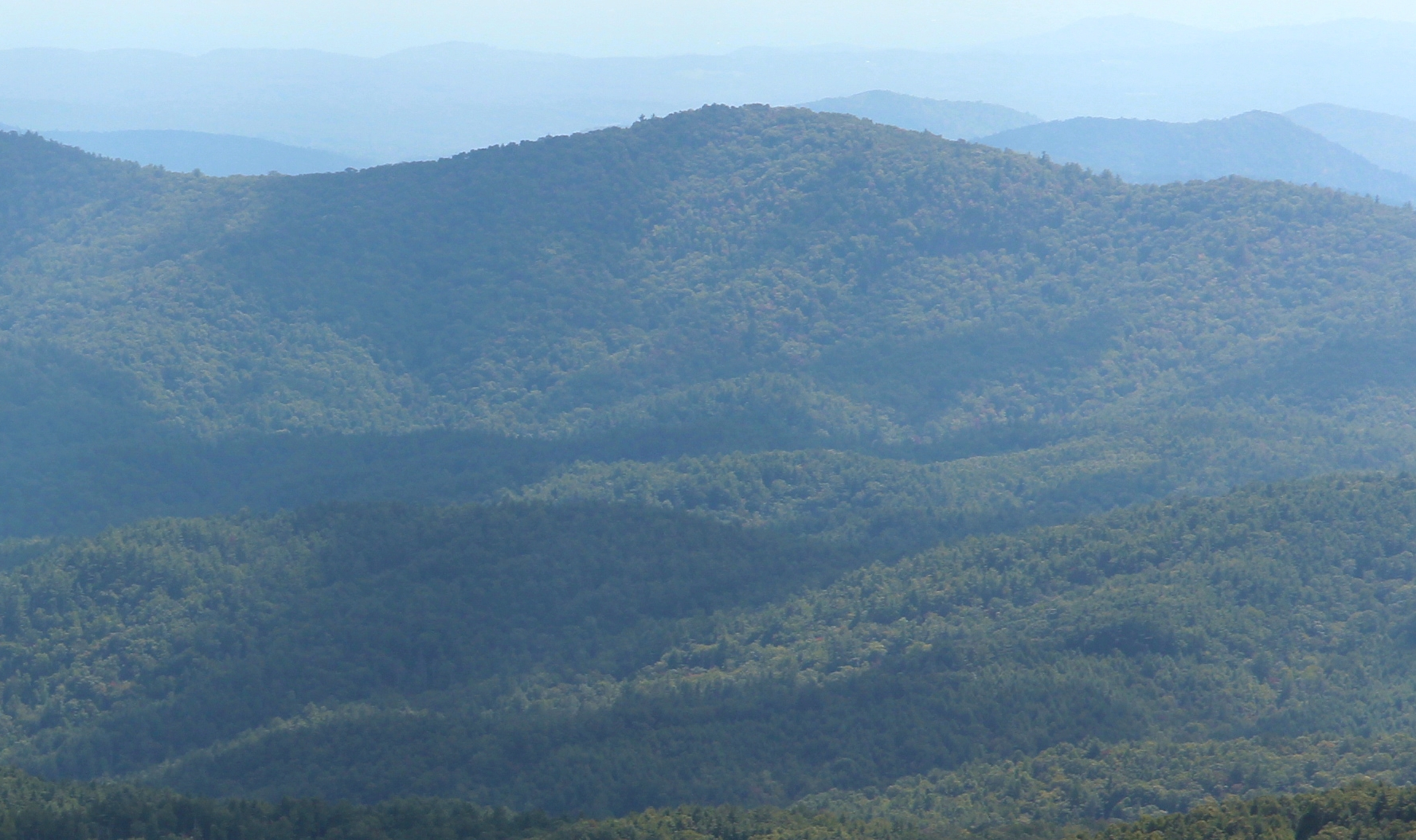
Glade Mountain viewed from Whiteside Mountain

Glade Mountain, elevation 3,672 feet (1,119 m), is the highest point in the Ellicott Rock Wilderness, which straddles Georgia, North Carolina, and South Carolina. It is also in the Chattahoochee National Forest in Rabun County, Georgia.
