= American Airlines Flight 6001 =

January 1945 plane crash in Burbank, California

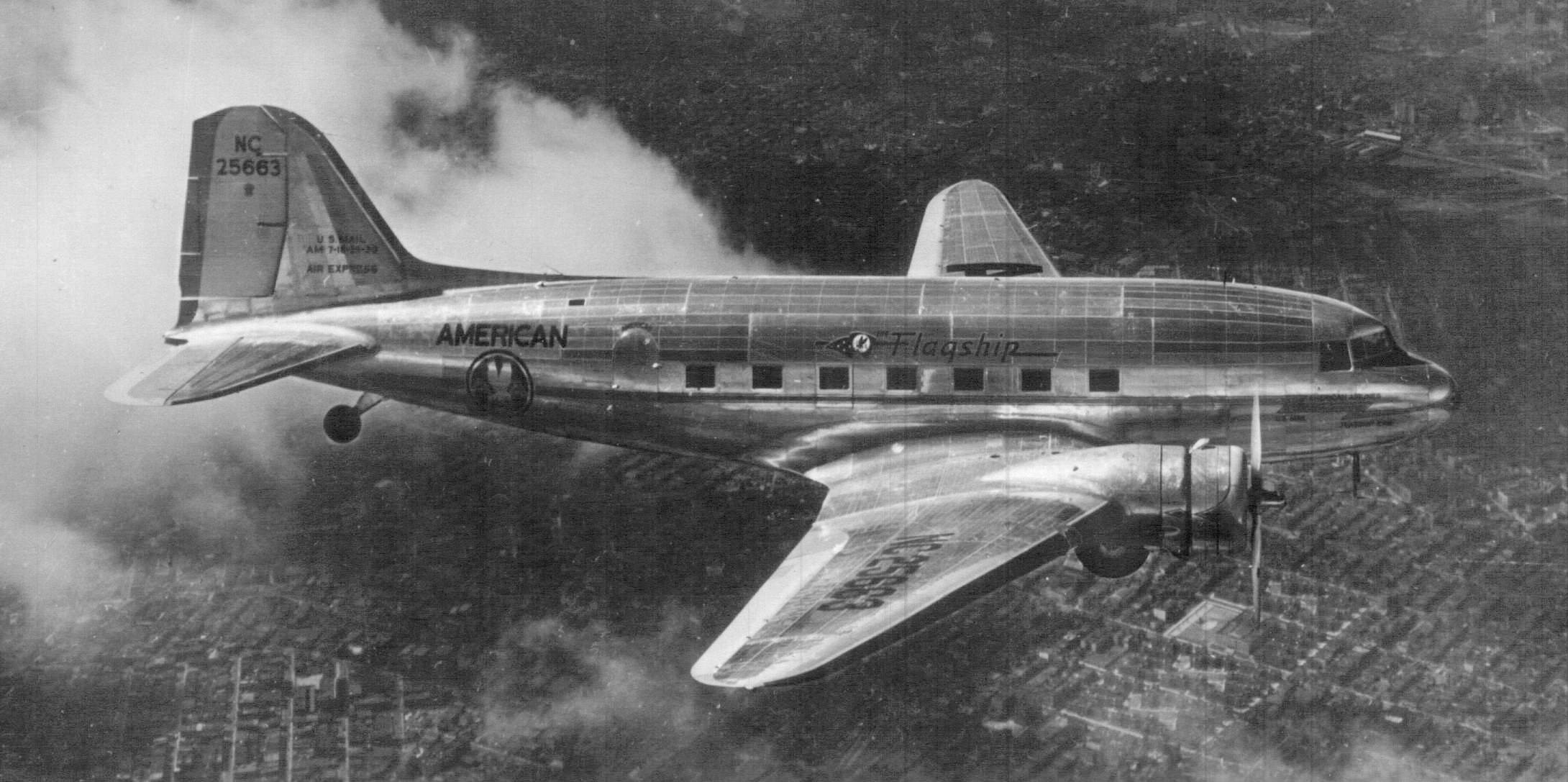
- An American Airlines Douglas DC-3, similar to the accident aircraft

Accident
- Date: January 10, 1945
- Summary: Controlled flight into terrain in poor weather
- Site: Verdugo Hills, Burbank, California, U.S. 34°10′49″N 118°19′42″W

Aircraft
- Aircraft type: Douglas DC-3-277B
- Operator: American Airlines
- Registration: NC25684
- Flight origin: LaGuardia Airport, New York City, New York, United States
- 1st stopover: El Paso International Airport, El Paso, Texas
- Last stopover: Phoenix Sky Harbor International Airport, Phoenix, Arizona
- Destination: Hollywood Burbank Airport, Burbank, California
- Occupants: 24
- Passengers: 21
- Crew: 3
- Fatalities: 24
- Survivors: 0

External videos
- Aircraft and Aviation Archeology analysis
- AVIA SVIT analysis

American Airlines Flight 6001 was a transcontinental flight from New York City's LaGuardia Airport to Hollywood Burbank Airport. On the morning of January 10, 1945, during a missed approach to Hollywood Burbank Airport, the American Airlines Douglas DC-3-277B operating the flight crashed into the nearby Verdugo Hills. All of the 21 passengers and 3 crew members were killed in the crash.

== Background ==
=== Aircraft ===
The aircraft involved in the accident was a Douglas DC-3-277B registered as NC25684. It was manufactured in May 1940 and delivered to American Airlines the same month. It had 14,888 hours of flying time and passed its last inspection on January 6, 1945.

=== Flight crew ===
Captain Joseph Russell McCauley (33), had 6,315 flight hours, 4,660 of which were on the DC-3. He had been employed by American Airlines since March 1940.

First officer Robert Gaylord Eitner (25), had 2,143 flight hours, 1,729 of which were on the DC-3. He had been employed by American Airlines since September 1942.

There was one stewardess on board, Lila Agnes Docken (22), who had worked for American Airlines since April 1944.

== Accident ==
American Airlines Flight 6001 took off from New York-LaGuardia at 7:23 p.m. EST on January 9, 1945. A crew change occurred in El Paso at 1:46 a.m. CST on the morning of January 10. After departing Phoenix, the flight was cleared to Newhall, California due to unfavorable weather conditions at Burbank. At 3 a.m. PST, the weather report showed a ceiling of 700 feet, overcast, visibility of two miles, and light fog. At 3:06 a.m., the flight was cleared by the Los Angeles Air Traffic Control to proceed to Burbank as originally planned.

At 3:42 a.m., the pilot was given the 3:30 a.m. weather report from Burbank. The flight was then cleared for a standard instrument approach to Burbank. The plane began its initial approach at 3:55 a.m. At 4:06 a.m., the plane was seen to fly across the airport, start a left turn, and then disappear from view. At 4:07 a.m., the captain radioed to Air Traffic Control that he was unable to maintain contact and was proceeding to Palmdale. All subsequent attempts to contact the plane from the tower, American Airlines, and other radio stations were unsuccessful.

At approximately 9:30 a.m., the control tower sighted the wreckage on a hillside about 2.75 miles northeast of the airport. All 21 passengers and three crew members were killed in the destruction of the aircraft by impact and fire.

== Probable cause ==
According to the Civil Aeronautics Board report, the probable cause was "the pilot's attempt to use the standard 'missed-approach' procedure after having followed another course up to a point where it was impossible to apply this procedure safely."

== See also ==
- List of accidents and incidents involving commercial aircraft
