= American Airlines Flight 2 =

1944 crash in Mississippi River with no survivors

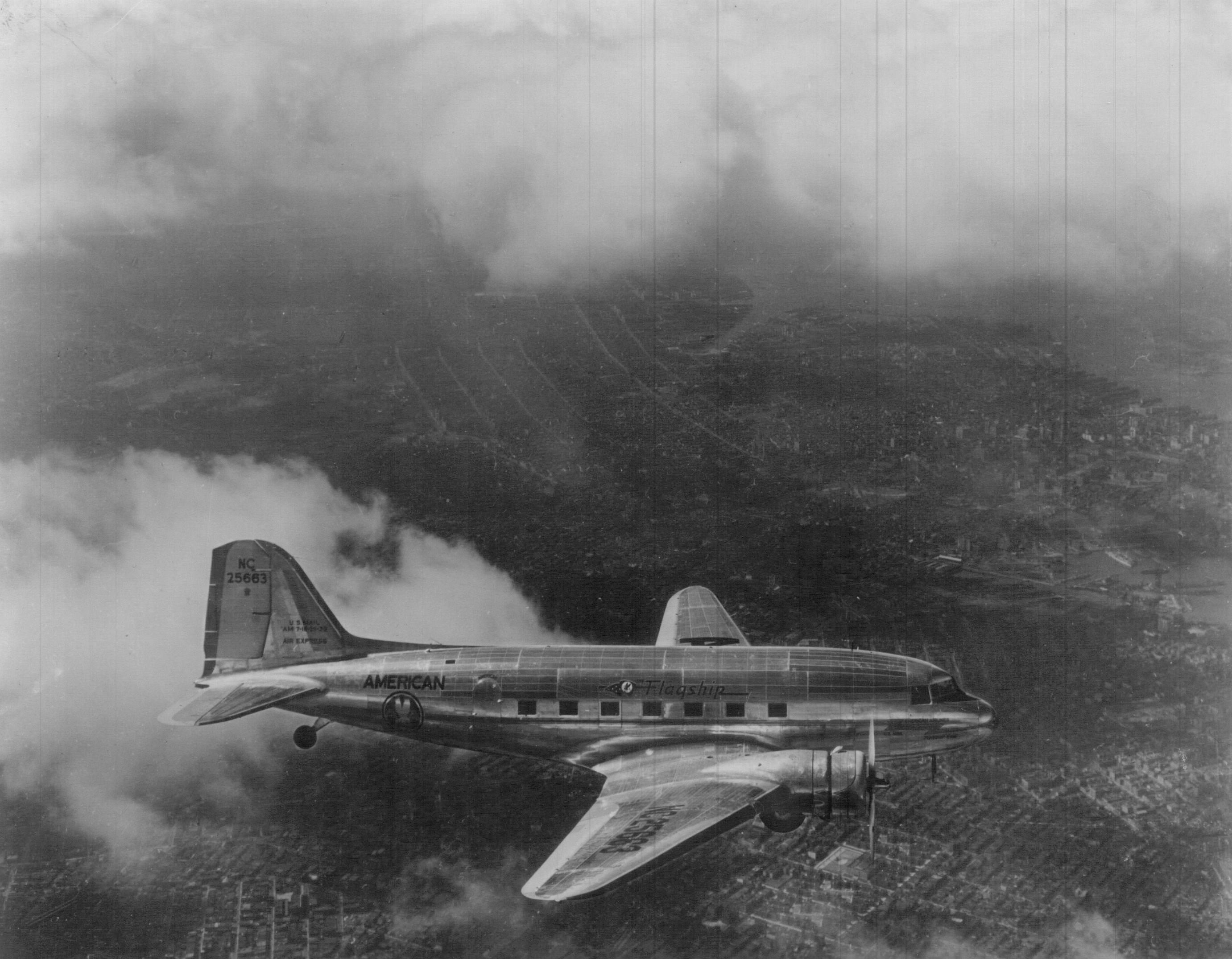
- A similar American Airlines DC-3

Accident
- Date: February 10, 1944
- Summary: Controlled flight into terrain, cause unknown
- Site: Mississippi River near West Memphis, Arkansas; 34.53°N 90.15°W

Aircraft
- Aircraft type: Douglas DC-3-277A
- Operator: American Airlines
- IATA flight No.: AA2
- ICAO flight No.: AAL2
- Call sign: AMERICAN 2
- Registration: NC21767
- Flight origin: Little Rock National Airport, Little Rock, Arkansas
- Destination: Memphis Municipal Airport, Memphis, Tennessee
- Occupants: 24
- Passengers: 21
- Crew: 3
- Fatalities: 24
- Survivors: 0

American Airlines Flight 2 was a Douglas DC-3 that crashed into the Mississippi River on February 10, 1944. All twenty-four passengers and crew were killed. The ultimate cause of the crash remains a mystery.

== Flight and aircraft ==
Flight 2 was a domestic scheduled passenger flight between Little Rock National Airport in Little Rock, Arkansas and Memphis Municipal Airport in Memphis, Tennessee. The aircraft was a DC-3-277A manufactured by the Douglas Aircraft Company and operated by American Airlines. The craft was five years old, having first entered service in 1939, and had accumulated a total of 12,446 hours of flight time at the time of the crash.

The plane departed Little Rock National Airport with three crew and twenty-one passengers on board. At 11:36 pm, approximately 29 kilometres (18 mi) southwest of Memphis Municipal Airport, the DC-3 descended at an angle of 20 degrees, the right wing slightly low, and struck the Mississippi River. There was no abnormal radio contact prior to the crash. All twenty-four people on the DC-3 were killed.

== Investigation ==
The Civil Aeronautics Board investigated the crash, but was unable to determine the probable cause of the accident. The report that was subsequently issued stated that the investigation would continue and a supplemental report would be issued as to their findings, but no such report was ever filed.

The Board is unable to determine the probable cause of this accident upon the available evidence which has been collected in the present investigation. Search for further information will continue and in the event that additional significant evidence is obtained a supplemental report will be issued.

— Civil Aeronautics Board, CAB File No. 523-44

== Flight 2 today ==
As of June 2023, Flight 2 is used on the Los Angeles-New York City (JFK) route, contrary to the convention of retiring flight numbers that have crashed.

== See also ==
- American Airlines
- American Airlines accidents and incidents
- List of accidents and incidents involving commercial aircraft
