= Weathervane effect =

Aircraft phenomenon

Weathervaning or weathercocking is a phenomenon experienced by aircraft on the ground and rotorcraft on the ground and when hovering.

Aircraft on the ground have a natural pivoting point on a plane through the main landing gear contact points [disregarding the effects of toe in/toe out of the main gear]. As most of the side area of an aircraft is typically behind this pivoting point, any crosswind will create a yawing moment tending to turn the nose of the aircraft into the wind.

It should not be confused with directional stability, as experienced by aircraft in flight.

The term also refers to a similar phenomenon in fin-guided small rockets which, when launched vertically, will tend to turn into a flight path that takes them upwind.

== See also ==
- Weathervane
