= American Airlines Flight 6-103 =

March 1946 plane crash on Thing Mountain, California

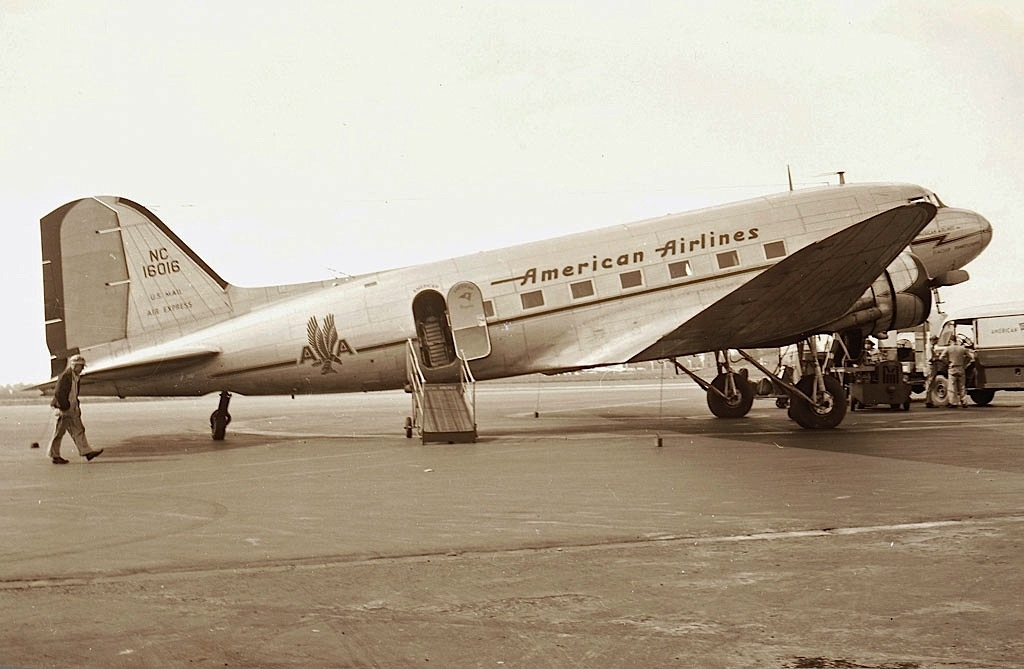
- An American Airlines Douglas DC-3, similar to the accident aircraft

Accident
- Date: March 3, 1946
- Summary: Controlled flight into terrain due to pilot error
- Site: Thing Mountain, 10 miles ESE of Pine Valley, California 32°49′41″N 116°31′36″W

Aircraft
- Aircraft type: Douglas DC-3-277B
- Operator: American Airlines
- Registration: NC21799
- Flight origin: New York City, New York
- 1st stopover: Nashville, Tennessee
- 2nd stopover: Dallas, Texas
- 3rd stopover: El Paso, Texas
- 4th stopover: Tucson International Airport, Tucson, Arizona
- Destination: San Diego, California
- Occupants: 27 (Note: Until 1960, the National Transportation Safety Board (NTSB) did not count infants (non-paying passengers) in official fatality records of airplane crashes. This policy was changed in 1960 to include all fatalities regardless of age or fare status.)
- Passengers: 24
- Crew: 3
- Fatalities: 27
- Survivors: 0

American Airlines Flight 6-103 was a transcontinental flight from New York City to San Diego, with intermediate stops in Nashville, Dallas, El Paso, and Tucson. At 8:12 a.m. PST on the morning of March 3, 1946, the Douglas DC-3 operating the flight crashed into the slope of Thing Mountain, California, during its final leg from El Paso to San Diego. All 27 occupants on board were killed, including 3 crew, 22 adult passengers, and 2 infants.

The crash was at the time the deadliest American airliner accident.

The exact crash site was not known after the initial investigation until it was re-discovered in 2015.

== Background ==
=== Aircraft ===
The aircraft involved in the crash was an American Airlines Douglas DC-3-277B, registered as NC21799. Its first flight was in 1940 and it had 16,322 hours of flying time.

=== Flight crew ===
The captain of the flight was Samuel Edward Stoner (age 30), of San Gabriel, California. He was employed by American Airlines in September 1939 and had 6,793 flight hours, 4,235 of which were in the Douglas DC-3.

The first officer was Emmett Edward Baker Jr. (age 25), of Brinkley, Arkansas. He was hired by American Airlines three months before the accident and had 3,300 flight hours, 1,000 of which were obtained during his time in the Navy.

There was one stewardess aboard the flight: Maxime Catherine Rickard (age 23). All members of the flight crew were properly certified and qualified for the flight.

== Accident ==
American Airlines Flight 6-103 departed New York City at 9:02 a.m. on March 2, 1946. Crew changes were made in Nashville and El Paso, and the flight from New York to El Paso was uneventful.

The flight left El Paso at 3:25 a.m. on the morning of March 3, 1946. After arriving in Tucson at 5:37 a.m., it departed for San Diego at 5:59 a.m. The pilots gave routine position reports to air traffic control over Casa Grande, Gila Bend, and Yuma, Arizona. At 7:53 a.m., the flight reported its position over El Centro, California, at an altitude of 8,000 feet.

Air traffic control in Los Angeles delivered a clearance of 8000 feet cruising altitude for the flight to the American Airlines radio station in San Diego. The station then attempted to contact Flight 6–103, but all further attempts were unsuccessful.

Wreckage of Flight 6-103 was discovered at 1:05 p.m. the same day by a naval aircraft on the eastern slope of Thing Mountain, at an altitude of 4,870 feet, approximately 50 miles east of San Diego. All 27 passengers and crew were killed in the crash.

== Probable cause ==
According to the Civil Aeronautics Board which investigated the accident, "the probable cause was the action of the pilot in descending or permitting a descent to be made, into instrument conditions to an altitude below that required to maintain clearance over Thing Mountain. The reason for the descent has not been determined."

== Re-discovery of crash site ==
After the crash the bodies were removed and the wreckage was mostly cleared. As the exact crash site was not documented, it became unknown. After searching for decades by multiple people, the crash site was found at Thing Mountain in 2015. Only small pieces the wreck were found, including a pepper shaker lid engraved with the words “American Airlines Pepper” and the antenna from the top of the plane that may have caused the accident. The re-discovery led to plans for making tours to the crash site for relatives of the people who died in the crash.
