= American Airlines Flight 63 (July 1943) =

1943 aviation accident

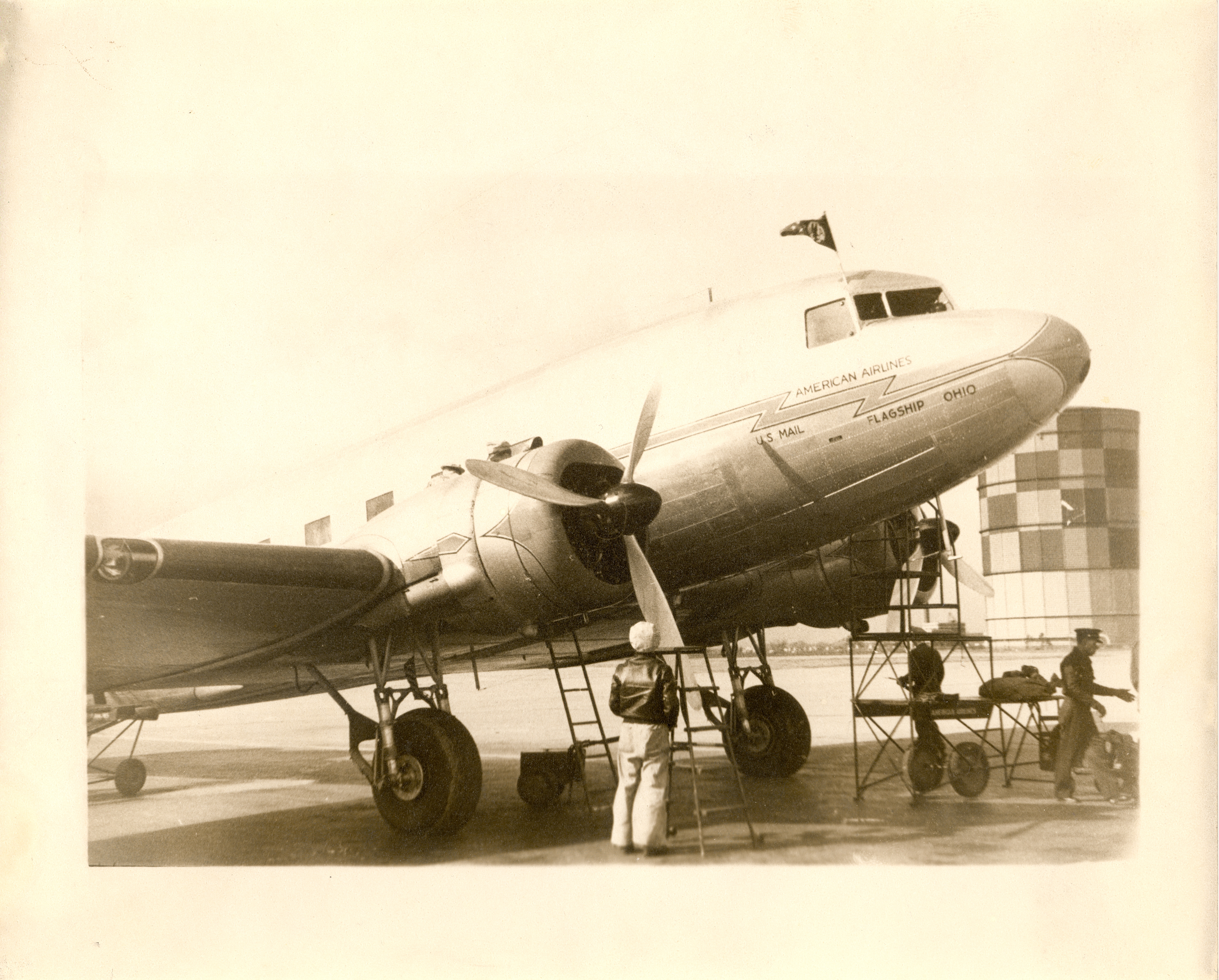
- NC16014, the aircraft involved in the accident

Accident
- Date: July 28, 1943
- Summary: Loss of control due to severe turbulence and violent downdrafts
- Site: near Scottsville, Kentucky; 36°47′8.22″N 86°22′16.65″W

Aircraft
- Aircraft type: Douglas DC-3-178
- Aircraft name: Flagship Ohio
- Operator: American Airlines
- Registration: NC16014
- Flight origin: Cleveland, Ohio
- 1st stopover: Columbus, Ohio
- 2nd stopover: Dayton, Ohio
- 3rd stopover: Cincinnati, Ohio
- 4th stopover: Louisville, Kentucky
- Last stopover: Nashville, Tennessee
- Destination: Memphis, Tennessee
- Occupants: 22
- Passengers: 18
- Crew: 4
- Fatalities: 20
- Survivors: 2

On July 28, 1943, American Airlines Flight 63 was flown by a Douglas DC-3, named Flagship Ohio, routing Cleveland-Columbus-Dayton-Cincinnati-Louisville-Nashville-Memphis, that crashed on the Louisville-Nashville sector about 1.6 miles (2.6 km) west of Trammel, Kentucky. The aircraft descended from 200 feet (61 m) until it struck trees, then slid across an open field and stopped in an upright position. Of the 22 people on board, 20 died. The cause of the crash was loss of control due to severe turbulence and violent downdrafts.

== Aircraft ==
Flagship Ohio was a Douglas DC-3 manufactured by the Douglas Aircraft Company and owned and operated by American Airlines. Since its first flight in 1936, the aircraft had logged 17,991 hours of flight time. At the time of the crash, it serviced a domestic scheduled passenger route with several stops in Ohio, Kentucky, and Tennessee.

== Crash ==
Flight 63 departed Cleveland at approximately 5:42 pm on July 28, 1943. The flight proceeded normally during its scheduled stops in Columbus, Dayton, Cincinnati, and Louisville. The aircraft arrived at its fourth stop, Louisville, at 9:42 pm. After refueling, the flight received clearance to depart at 9:54 pm. During the Louisville-Nashville leg, the Flagship Ohio was crewed by four American Airlines personnel, and carried eighteen passengers.

The aircraft's departure clearance specified an altitude of 2,500 feet (760 m) to Smiths Grove, Kentucky, and then at 2,000 feet (610 m) onward to Nashville. The projected arrival time was 10:54 pm — an hour's flight.

Thunderstorms around Smiths Grove caused extreme turbulence and strong downdrafts which forced the plane to lose altitude. The Smiths Grove area is characterized by hilly terrain with an elevation that ranges from 695 to 720 ft (212 to 219 m) above sea level. The plane clipped a clump of trees before skidding across an open field until it came to rest in an upright position in a copse of trees approximately 1,000 feet (300 m) away from its initial point of impact.

The Civil Aeronautics Board investigated the crash and determined that the extreme turbulence and conditions caused by the nearby thunderstorm created such severe flying conditions that the pilot was unable to maintain control of the aircraft.

Loss of control of the aircraft due to unusually severe turbulence and violent downdraft caused by a thunderstorm of unknown and unpredictable intensity.

— Civil Aeronautics Board, CAB File No. 325-43

All four crewmembers died in the crash. Of the eighteen passengers, only two survived.

After the loss of the Flagship Ohio, American Airlines replaced the aircraft on the Cleveland-Columbus-Dayton-Cincinnati-Louisville-Nashville-Memphis route with sister DC-3 Flagship Missouri. Three months later, on October 15, 1943, Flagship Missouri crashed on the Nashville-Memphis leg of the flight.

== See also ==
- American Airlines
- American Airlines Flight 63 (Flagship Missouri)
- American Airlines accidents and incidents
- List of accidents and incidents involving commercial aircraft
