= National Airlines (1934–1980) =

Airline of the United States (1934–1980)

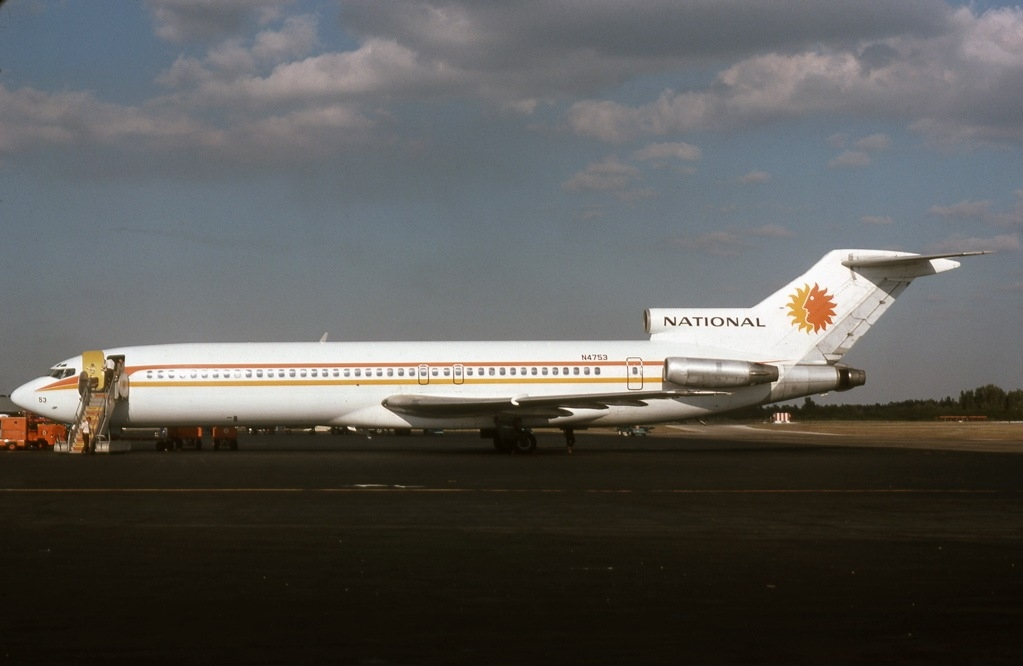
- A National Airlines Boeing 727-200 in 1980
IATA	ICAO	Call sign
NA	NAL	NATIONAL
- Founded: August 2, 1934 signed post office contract
- Commenced operations: October 15, 1934
- Ceased operations: January 7, 1980 (acquired by Pan Am)
- Operating bases: Jacksonville (FL); Miami; New Orleans; New York–JFK; Tampa
- Parent company: Pan Am Corporation
- Headquarters: Miami-Dade County, Florida, United States
- Key people: Louis "Bud" Maytag (CEO, 1962–1980)
- Founder: George T. Baker (CEO, 1934–1962)

National Airlines was a trunk carrier, a scheduled airline in the United States that operated from 1934 until it merged with Pan Am in 1980. For most of its existence the company was headquartered at Miami International Airport, Florida. At its height, National Airlines had a network of "Coast-to-Coast-to-Coast" flights, linking Florida and Gulf Coast destinations such as New Orleans and Houston with cities along the East Coast as far north as Boston as well as with large cities on the West Coast, including Los Angeles, San Francisco, and Seattle. From 1970 to 1978, National, Braniff International Airways, Pan American World Airways (Pan Am), and Trans World Airlines (TWA) were the only U.S. airlines permitted to operate scheduled passenger flights to Europe.

== History ==
=== 1930s ===
George T. Baker and D. K. Franklin created a partnership called National Airlines Taxi System to fly an airmail route from Daytona Beach to St. Petersburg, Florida, pursuant to a contract with the Post Office dated August 2, 1934. The route was operated continuously from October 15, 1934. On January 6, 1935, Franklin signed over his rights to Baker, and on March 1, 1935, Baker took over the contract as a sole proprietor, operating under the name National Airlines System until September 30, 1937. On that day, Baker's rights to the airmail contract and all property used to operate the contract were transferred to National Airlines, Inc., under a contract signed July 12, 1937. The new entity, National Airlines, was incorporated in Florida on 8 July 1937.

National Airlines was founded by George T. Baker (1899–1963) in 1934. Its headquarters were in St. Petersburg, Florida, and it was based at the city's Albert Whitted Airport. On October 15 of that year, revenue flights were launched, transporting passengers and mail from St. Petersburg to a few destinations within Florida using a fleet of two Ryan ST monoplanes. In 1935, the Stinson Trimotor was introduced with National Airlines, which were soon replaced by the Lockheed Model 10 Electra. In 1939, the company headquarters were moved to Jacksonville. By the end of the decade, the National Airlines network spanned from Miami to New Orleans, on what it called the Buccaneer Route.

=== 1940s ===
Revenue passenger traffic, in millions of passenger-miles (scheduled flights only, for years ending June 30)

Year	Pax-Miles
1936	0.249
1938	0.654
1939	1.34
1940	3.465
1941	7.264
1946	108.76

In 1940 the Lockheed Model 18 Lodestar became the backbone of National's fleet. National was awarded rights from Florida to New York City and other cities along the East Coast in 1944, with flights starting in 1945. In 1946 National got approval to fly to Havana, Cuba, which coincided with the introduction of the Douglas DC-4. The DC-4 allowed non-stop flights between Miami and New York that started on February 14, 1946. Later that year National relocated its headquarters to Miami International Airport; a maintenance base opened at Miami in 1950.

The Douglas DC-6, National's first pressurized airliner, began flights on July 1, 1947 and reduced New York to Miami flight time from five to four hours. Flights on the DC-6 were marketed as Star Service. National ran the Piggy Bank Vacations campaign, promoting low-fare flights to Florida during the off-peak summer season.

=== 1950s ===
This decade saw the introduction of the Convair 340/440, the Douglas DC-7, and the Lockheed L-1049 Super Constellation. On December 10, 1958, National became the first airline to operate domestic jet flights, using a Boeing 707 leased from Pan American World Airways between Miami and New York. In 1959 the Lockheed L-188 Electra was introduced into the fleet. It was the only turboprop aircraft type ever operated by the airline. At the end of the decade, Houston and Boston were the ends of the network, with heavy emphasis on service between Florida and the U.S. East Coast and Gulf Coast.

=== 1960s ===
With the award of traffic rights on the southern transcontinental route on March 11, 1961, National Airlines gained access to California and began operating new Douglas DC-8s between Florida and Los Angeles and San Francisco, with a number of flights stopping in Houston and/or New Orleans (previously, American Airlines, Delta Air Lines, and National had together operated Douglas DC-6s and DC-7s between Miami and California). In March 1962, National scheduled one round trip transcontinental nonstop flight: National flights 34 and 35 between Miami and Los Angeles on DC-8s. Concerning international destinations in Central and South America, a cooperation involving interchange flights with Pan Am was set up.

In the early 1960s, National started a new service with the Lockheed Electra propjet to Las Vegas and San Diego. Eastbound coast to coast routes flown with the Electra included San Diego-Los Angeles-Houston-New Orleans-Miami and San Francisco-Las Vegas-Houston-New Orleans-Tampa-Orlando-Jacksonville. National had other long, multistop routings with the Electra ,such as Boston-New York City-Jacksonville-Orlando-Tampa-New Orleans-Houston-Las Vegas-San Francisco. National fFight 223 departed Boston at 7:30am and arrived in San Francisco at 8:42pm.

In 1962 Louis Bergman "Bud" Maytag, Jr. (grandson of Maytag Corporation founder Frederick Louis Maytag I), who had previously led Frontier Airlines bought a majority share in National Airlines and replaced George T. Baker as CEO. In 1960 the airline modernized its fleet with new Douglas DC-8s, followed by ten new Boeing 727-100 trijets, the first of which was delivered in 1964.

After the retirement of the Electras in 1968, National became an all-jet airline with the DC-8 and 727. The airline introduced the first jet service into Key West, FL, in 1968 with the Boeing 727-100. The Douglas DC-8 fleet included the stretched Super DC-8-61, which was the largest aircraft type operated by the airline until the introduction of new wide-body jetliners such as the Boeing 747 and McDonnell Douglas DC-10. In 1969 National flew the Super DC-8 nonstop between Miami and New York JFK airport and nonstop between Miami and Los Angeles, flights having names such as "The Royal Biscayne," "The Royal Dolphin," "The Gotham," and "The Manhattan" between Miami and New York, and "The Californian" and "The Caribbean" between Miami and Los Angeles.

On July 26, 1969, the Atlanta-San Francisco nonstop route was awarded to National, and service began on October 1, 1969. It was National's only route out of Atlanta.

=== 1970s ===
Revenue passenger traffic, in millions of passenger-miles (scheduled flights only, domestic and international)

Year	Pax-Miles
1951	432
1955	905
1960	1041
1965	2663
1970	2643
1975	3865

A $17 million IBM electronic computer reservation system, called Res-A-Vision, was completed and put into operation in 1970.

On June 16, 1970, National Airlines reintroduced international flights, when their Miami-London route opened (flights to Cuba were suspended in 1961 after the Cuban Revolution). With the London route, they became the third U.S. transatlantic passenger carrier, after Pan Am and TWA.

In the fall of 1970, the Boeing 747-100 jumbo jet, at that time the largest commercial airliner, entered service with National on the Miami-New York nonstop route on October 1, 1970, and the Miami-Los Angeles transcontinental nonstop route on October 25, 1970. National sold its 747s in May 1976. Also in 1970, National Airlines opened their own terminal at John F. Kennedy International Airport, which was dubbed the Sundrome.

Following an order for ten aircraft in 1969, the widebody McDonnell Douglas DC-10-10 was put in service on the Miami-New York route on December 15, 1971. A 1971 publicity campaign designed by F. William Free promoting National's flight attendants was criticized by the National Organization for Women as being sexist due to the slogan "I'm (flight attendant's name). Fly me. Fly National," or similar. Seeing one of these posters in Manchester inspired Eric Stewart of 10cc to write the band's 1976 hit song "I'm Mandy Fly Me".

A proposed merger of National Airlines and Northwest Orient Airlines was announced on September 23, 1971, as an effort to combine National’s Florida, East Coast, and southern transcontinental network with Northwest’s Upper Midwest, western U.S., and trans-Pacific system, creating a geographically complementary national and international airline. Under the agreement, National would be absorbed into Northwest, with National shareholders receiving 0.85 Northwest shares for each National share; shareholders of both companies overwhelmingly approved the transaction in December 1971. The airlines argued that the merger would generate operating economies, improve aircraft utilization, connect complementary seasonal traffic flows, and provide passengers with expanded through-service while eliminating relatively little direct competition. However, the proposal faced opposition from labor unions and the Department of Justice and Civil Aeronautics Board staff, who argued that both airlines were financially viable independent competitors and that eliminating one major trunk carrier could reduce competition. After CAB hearings in early 1972, examiner Robert L. Park recommended against approval on May 22, concluding that the claimed benefits did not justify the loss of an independent airline. Although the decision was only an examiner’s recommendation rather than a final CAB rejection, prolonged regulatory uncertainty weakened support for the transaction, and on November 28, 1972, National’s board unilaterally terminated the merger agreement before the full board issued a final decision.

In May 1973, the front cover of the airline's system timetable proudly proclaimed, "National has daily nonstop 747s from Miami to London". By early 1976, the airline was operating scheduled wide body DC-10 service to Houston (IAH), Las Vegas (LAS), Los Angeles (LAX), Miami (MIA), New Orleans (MSY), Orlando (MCO), San Diego (SAN), San Francisco (SFO), Tampa (TPA), West Palm Beach (PBI) and all three airports in the New York City area: John F. Kennedy (JFK), LaGuardia (LGA), and Newark (EWR). With the advent of the intercontinental McDonnell Douglas DC-10-30, National Airlines then expanded their European network by adding Paris (inaugurated on June 22, 1977), as well as Frankfurt, Amsterdam (both in 1978) and Zürich (in 1979). National began the very first nonstop flights from New Orleans to Europe (to Amsterdam) on July 2, 1978. National then began nonstop New York Kennedy (JFK)-Amsterdam flights on December 13, 1978, taking the route over from Pan Am.

National was criticized in 1974 by the Civil Aeronautics Board for giving preferential treatment to Rudy Vallée, allowing him to travel between Los Angeles and Florida with more than 20 bags without charges for excess baggage.

In 1975, National was forced to shut down for several months due to a strike by flight attendants.

In the late 1970s, several airlines attempted to take over National Airlines, which had become a major player in the southern transcontinental and Florida-East Coast airline markets. In 1978, Texas International Airlines (which was led by Frank Lorenzo at that time) acquired 24.6 percent of the shares, but did not succeed in the subsequent tender offer takeover bid. A similar attempt was made by Eastern Air Lines in 1979. At the same time, the shares held by Texas International were sold to Pan American World Airways, who emerged as a white knight and succeeded in accumulating a controlling majority.

=== Acquisition by Pan Am ===
On January 7, 1980, the acquisition of National was completed, with Pan Am taking over the National Airlines fleet and route network. Pan Am continued to utilize the former National Miami maintenance base and headquarters building until Pan Am itself ceased operations in December 1991. Much later, National's "Sun King" logo was sold and repackaged, much like Pan Am's, to start-up low-cost carrier Southeast Airlines, which used it on the tail of its aircraft.

Most industry analysts believe that Pan Am paid too high a price for National and was ill-prepared to integrate National's domestic route network with Pan Am's own globe-girdling international network. The cultures of National and Pan Am also proved to be incompatible, making workforce integration difficult. Texas International walked away from their foiled attempt with a multi-million dollar stock profit and was poised for Lorenzo's next ventures—a startup airline in the high-density East Coast corridor (New York Air) and subsequent acquisition of Continental Airlines.

== Route network ==
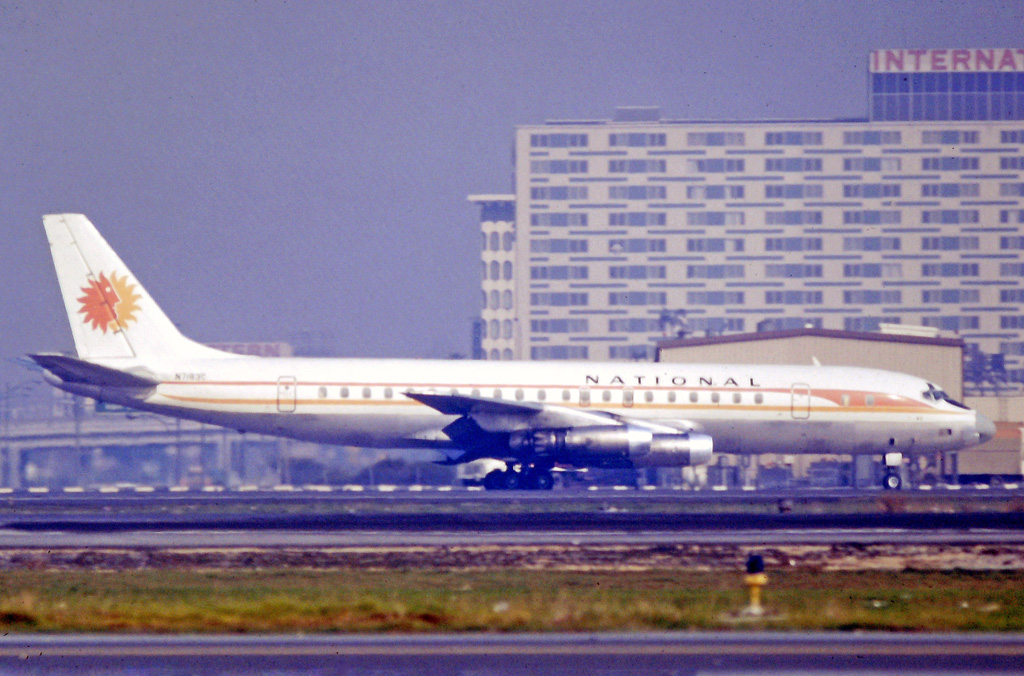
National Douglas DC-8 at Los Angeles International Airport (1971)

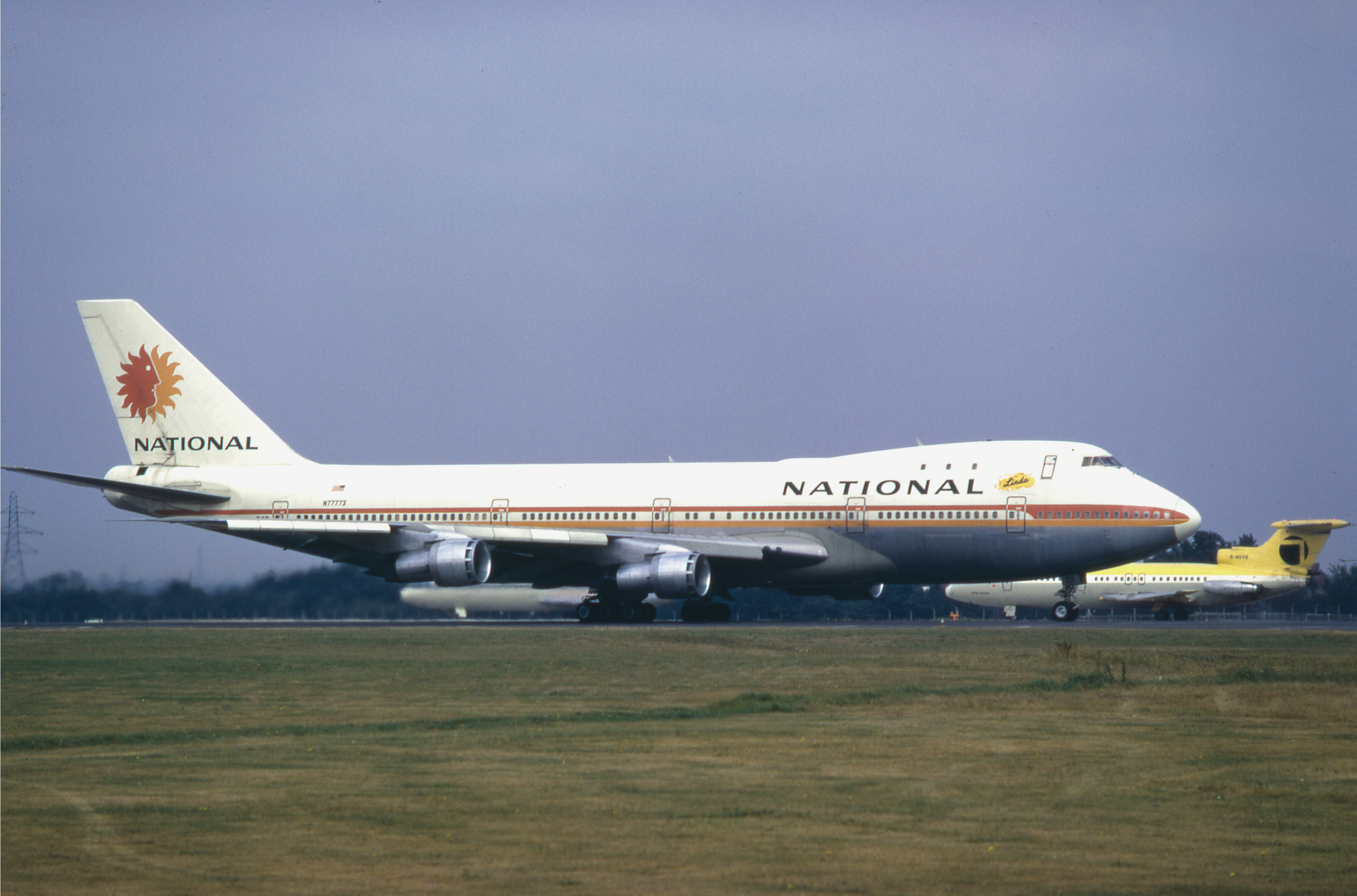
National Boeing 747-100 at London Heathrow Airport (1973)

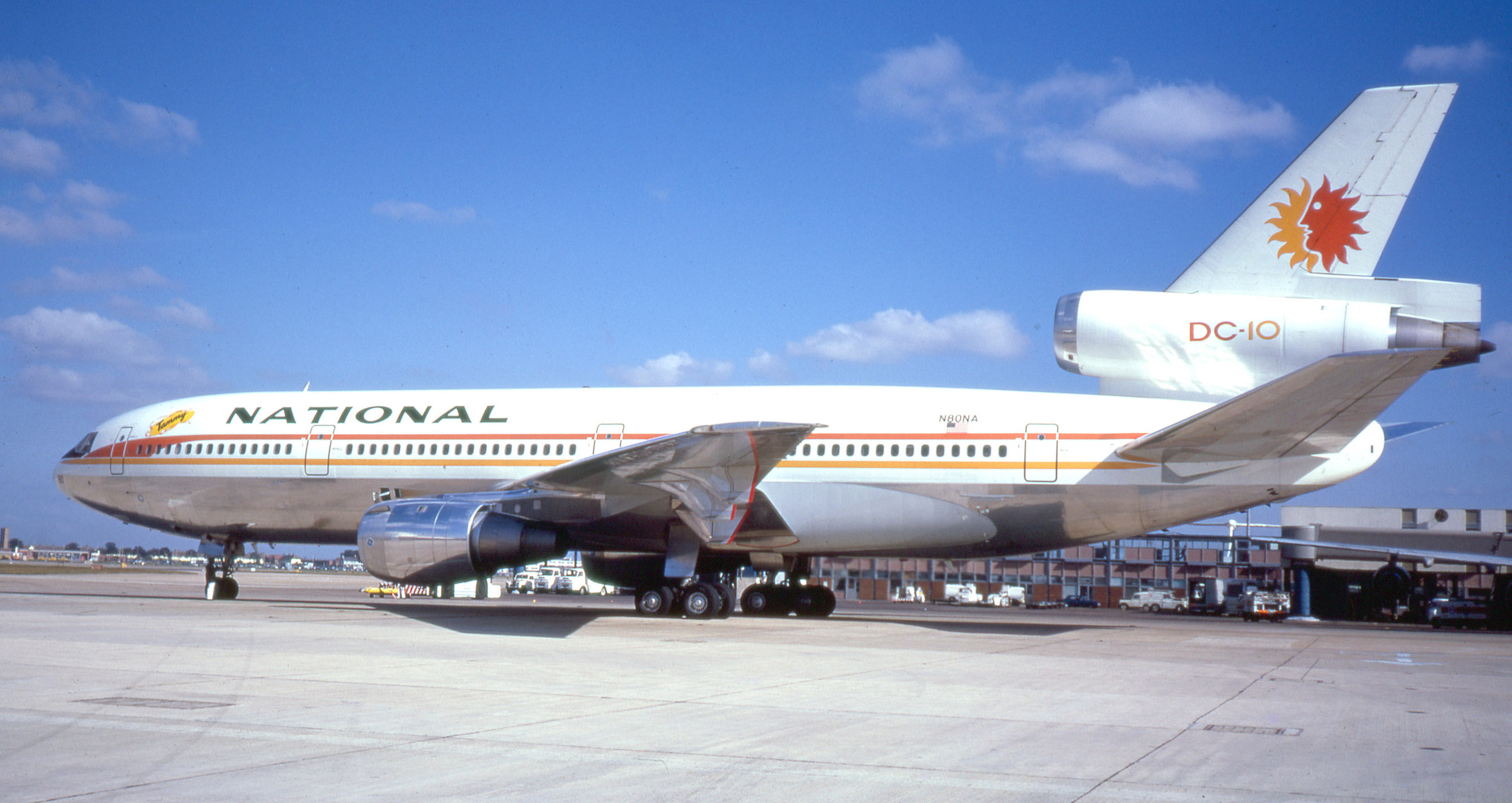
National McDonnell Douglas DC-10 at Heathrow in 1974. This aircraft would later be written off in 1993

National Airlines operated scheduled flights to the following U.S. cities:

Location	State	Airport(s)	Began	Ended	Notes
Mobile	Alabama	Mobile Municipal Airport; Mobile Regional Airport	November 1, 1938	1980	
Los Angeles	California	Los Angeles International Airport	June 11, 1961	1980	
San Diego	California	San Diego International Airport	June 11, 1961	1980	
San Francisco	California	San Francisco International Airport	June 11, 1961	1980	
San Jose	California	San Jose International Airport	July 1, 1976	1979	
Daytona Beach	Florida	Daytona Beach Airport; Daytona Beach International Airport	October 15, 1934	1980	
Fort Lauderdale	Florida	Fort Lauderdale–Hollywood International Airport	October 19, 1959	1980	
Fort Myers	Florida	Page Field	July 16, 1937	1980	
Jacksonville	Florida	Jacksonville Municipal Airport; Imeson Field	November 19, 1934	1980	focus city
Key West	Florida	Key West International Airport	March 1, 1944	ca. 1970	
Lakeland	Florida	Lakeland Municipal Airport (Drane Field)	1934	1962	
Marathon	Florida	Florida Keys Marathon Airport	1959	1961	
Marianna	Florida	Marianna Municipal Airport	1938	1961	
Melbourne	Florida	Melbourne Airport	April 26, 1959	1980	
Miami	Florida	Miami Municipal Airport; Miami International Airport	July 16, 1937	1980	main base
Orlando	Florida	Orlando Municipal Airport; Orlando International Airport	October 15, 1934	1980	
Palm Beach	Florida	Morrison Field	August 1, 1944	1980	
Panama City	Florida	Panama City-Bay County Airport	September 1, 1948	1980	
Pensacola	Florida	Pensacola Municipal Airport	November 1, 1938	1980	
Sarasota	Florida	Sarasota-Brandenton Airport	July 16, 1937	1980	
St. Petersburg	Florida	Albert Whitted Airport; St. Petersburg–Clearwater International Airport	October 15, 1934	1961	
Tallahassee	Florida	Tallahassee Municipal Airport	November 1, 1938	1980	
Tampa	Florida	Davis Islands Airport; Tampa International Airport	October 15, 1934	1980	focus city
Atlanta	Georgia	William B. Hartsfield Atlanta International Airport	October 1, 1969	1978	
Savannah	Georgia	Savannah Airport	July 15, 1946	1980	
Valdosta	Georgia	Valdosta Regional Airport	1946	1960	
New Orleans	Louisiana	Shushan Airport; New Orleans International Airport	November 1, 1938	1980	focus city
Baltimore	Maryland	Friendship Airport	September 1, 1948 (Harbor Field 1948)	1980	
Boston	Massachusetts	Boston Logan International Airport	December 14, 1956	1980	
Gulfport	Mississippi	Gulfport-Biloxi Airport	1938	1959-60	
Las Vegas	Nevada	McCarran International Airport	June 11, 1961	1980	
Newark	New Jersey	Newark Airport	February 12, 1946	1980	
New York City	New York	Idlewild/Kennedy Airport	October 1, 1944	1980	focus city
New York City	New York	LaGuardia Airport	October 1, 1944, end 1947 resume 1966	1980	
Fayetteville	North Carolina	Fayetteville Municipal Airport	1956-57	1962	
New Bern	North Carolina	Simmons-Nott Airport	1946	1962	
Wilmington	North Carolina	Bluethenthal Field	1945-46	1962	
Philadelphia	Pennsylvania	Philadelphia International Airport	July 1, 1945	1980	
Providence	Rhode Island	T. F. Green Airport	December 14, 1956	1980	
Charleston	South Carolina	Charleston Airport	July 1, 1945	1980	
Houston	Texas	William P. Hobby Airport followed by Houston Intercontinental Airport	November 20, 1956	1980	
Newport News	Virginia	Newport News/Williamsburg International Airport	1955	1980	
Norfolk	Virginia	Norfolk Airport	December 1, 1945	1980	
Richmond	Virginia	Richmond International Airport	1948	1971	
Seattle	Washington	Seattle–Tacoma International Airport	April 1, 1979	1980	
Washington, D.C.	Virginia	Washington National Airport	February 25, 1948	1980	

National also operated scheduled flights to the following destinations in Europe and the Caribbean:

Location	Country	Airport	Commenced	Ceased
Havana	Cuba	José Martí International Airport	1946	1961
Paris	France	Orly Airport	June 22, 1977	1980
Amsterdam	Netherlands	Amsterdam Airport Schiphol	May 4, 1978	1980
San Juan	Puerto Rico	Luis Muñoz Marín International Airport	April 1, 1979	1980
Zürich	Switzerland	Zurich Airport	July 22, 1979	1980
London	United Kingdom	Heathrow Airport	June 16, 1970	1980
Frankfurt	West Germany	Frankfurt Airport	May 1, 1978	1980

== Fleet ==
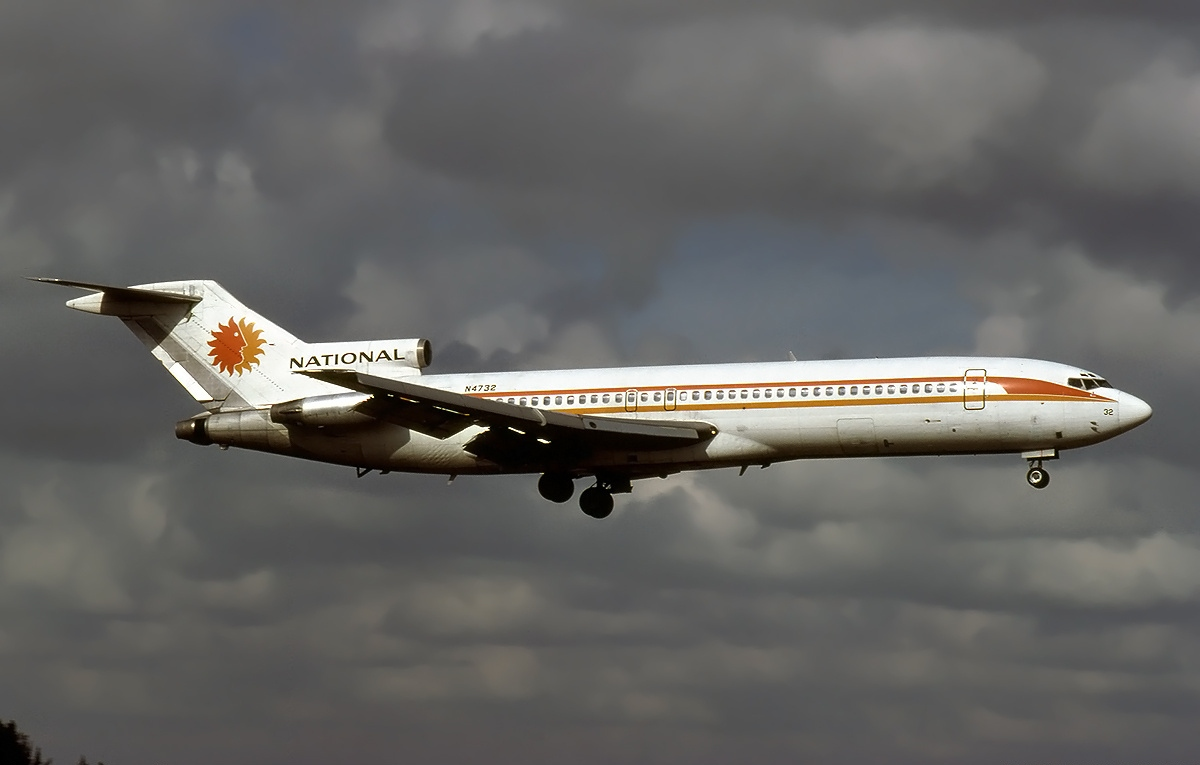
A Boeing 727 in the livery of National Airlines landing at Miami International Airport (1980). The airline had already been taken over by Pan Am.

When National Airlines was acquired by Pan Am in 1980, the fleet consisted of 43 Boeing 727 aircraft (19 of the original series 100 model and 24 of the stretched series 200 variant), as well as 16 McDonnell Douglas DC-10 airliners (11 of the series 10 model used in domestic service and five of the intercontinental series 30 model used for service to Europe).

Over the years, National Airlines owned the following aircraft types:

National Airlines historical fleet
Aircraft	Total	Introduced	Retired	Remark
Boeing 707-120	1	1958	1958	N710PA leased from Pan Am
Boeing 727-100	21	1964	1980	
Boeing 727-200	27	1967	1980	
Boeing 747-100	2	1970	1976	N77772, N77773
Convair CV-340	1	1954	1960	N11136
Convair CV-440	1	1953	1960	N8415H
Curtiss C-46F Commando	2	1948	1954	N1661M, N1662M
Douglas C-54	3	1949	1950	N88444, N88852, N95490
Douglas DC-4-1009	7	1946	1952	
Douglas DC-6	8	1947	1963	
Douglas DC-6B	13	1952	1963	
Douglas DC-7	9	1953	1964	
Douglas DC-8-20	3	1960	1974	N6571B, N6572C, N6573C
Douglas DC-8-30	5	1963	1978	
Douglas DC-8-50	9	1961	1973	
Douglas DC-8-61	2	1967	1975	N45090, N45191
Lockheed C-60	4	1940	1956	
Lockheed L-188 Electra	17	1959	1968	
Lockheed L-1049H Super Constellation	4	1957	1964	N7131C, N7132C, N7133C, N7134C
Lockheed Model 18 Lodestar	4	1940	1956	
McDonnell Douglas DC-10-10	11	1971	1980	
McDonnell Douglas DC-10-30	4	1971	1980	N80NA, N81NA, N82NA, N83NA
Ryan B-5 Brougham	2	1934	n/a	NC9234, NC545N
Ryan B-7 Brougham	1	1934	n/a	NC723M
Sikorsky S-55	1	1953	1954	N423A
Stinson U Tri-Motor	n/a	1935	n/a	NC432M

== Sun King Club ==
=== Domestic ===
- Fort Lauderdale
- Houston
- Miami
- Jacksonville
- Los Angeles
- New Orleans
- New York (Kennedy)
- New York (LaGuardia)
- Newark
- Orlando
- San Francisco
- Tampa
- Washington (National)
- West Palm Beach

=== International ===
- Amsterdam
- Frankfurt
- London (Heathrow)
- Paris (Orly)

== Accidents and incidents ==
=== Fatal ===
- On October 5, 1945, National Airlines Flight 16, a Lockheed Model 18 Lodestar (registered NC18199) crashed into a lake near Lakeland, Florida at 01:05 local time. The scheduled passenger flight had originated in Tampa, when the pilots encountered technical problems during approach of Lakeland Airport, which led to a failed go-around attempt. Of the 15 people on board, two passengers died.
- On January 14, 1951, 6 of the 28 passengers on board Flight 83 died when the aircraft, a Douglas DC-4 (registered N74685), overshot the runway and crashed into a ditch at Philadelphia International Airport. The pilots of the flight from New York City had tried to land the aircraft too far down the runway, instead of aborting the approach. Frankie Housley, the only stewardess, also died. She has been regarded as a hero, as she had returned to the burning wreckage to lead passengers to safety.
- On February 11, 1952, Flight 101, a Douglas DC-6, crashed shortly after take-off from Newark Airport due to a failure of a propeller and subsequent loss of control. Of the 59 passengers on board, 26 died, as well as three of the four crew members. Four people on the ground were killed.
- With 46 fatalities (5 crew and 41 passengers, among them Billy DeBeck's widow), the disaster of Flight 470 on February 14, 1953, marks the worst accident in the history of National Airlines. The aircraft, a DC-6 registered N90893, crashed into the Gulf of Mexico 20 miles (32 km) off Mobile Point en route from Tampa to New Orleans, after having encountered severe turbulence.
- On November 16, 1959, at 00:55 local time, a Douglas DC-7 (registered N4891C) crashed into the Gulf of Mexico, the cause of which could not be determined. The 36 passengers and six crew aboard Flight 967 from Tampa to New Orleans died in the accident 35.6 miles (57.3 km) off the coast of Pilottown, Louisiana.
- On January 6, 1960, a bomb exploded aboard the DC-6 registered N8225H Flight 2511 en route from New York to Miami. In the subsequent crash near Bolivia, North Carolina, all 29 passengers and five crew died. One of the passengers, who was under criminal investigation, is suspected of committing a suicide bombing.
- On November 3, 1973, a McDonnell Douglas DC-10 (registered N60NA) suffered an uncontained engine failure over Datil, New Mexico while operating as Flight 27 from Houston to Las Vegas. Pieces of the turbine penetrated the fuselage, breaking a window in the passenger cabin and causing subsequent decompression. One passenger was sucked out of the aircraft and died. The flight made a successful emergency landing at Albuquerque.

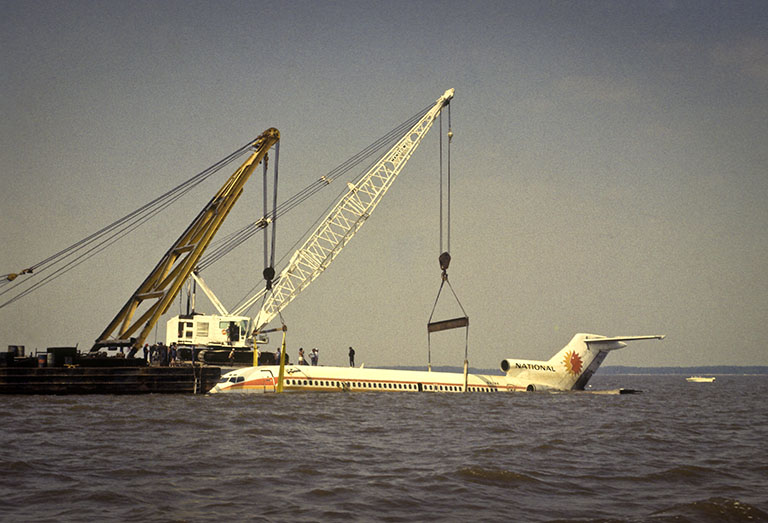
The wreckage of Flight 193 (1978).

- On May 8, 1978, at 21:20 local time, Flight 193 went down in Escambia Bay near Pensacola, in 12 ft (3.7 m) deep water. Of the 52 passengers aboard the Boeing 727 registered N4744, three died. The pilots had attempted to land the aircraft at Pensacola International Airport.

=== Non-fatal ===
- On September 13, 1945, a National Airlines Lockheed Lodestar (registered NC33349) overshot the runway at Peter O. Knight Airport near Tampa in rainy weather and came to a rest in the water of Hillsborough Bay. There were eleven passengers and three crew members on board the scheduled flight from Miami.
- On October 11, 1945, another Lodestar (NC15555) was involved in a hull-loss accident. The pilots of Flight 23 from Jacksonville to Miami with 14 passengers aboard experienced an engine fire and attempted an emergency landing at Melbourne Airport. The approach was missed, but the pilots did not manage to pull the aircraft up, so it impacted the ground.
- On October 2, 1950, a cargo-configured Curtiss C-46 Commando (registered N1661M) was substantially damaged in a belly landing at Washington National Airport.
- On January 10, 1955, at 09:38, Flight 1 with ten passengers and three crew veered off the runway during a takeoff attempt at St. Petersburg-Clearwater Airport. The copilot had lost control of the Lockheed Lodestar (registered N33369) that had been bound for Sarasota.
- On November 15, 1961, at 17:10, National Airlines Flight 429 (a DC-6 registered N8228H) collided with Northeast Airlines Flight 120 (a Vickers Viscount) on the ground at Logan International Airport in Boston. The pilots of the National aircraft with 25 passengers aboard had commenced with the takeoff run without having been cleared to do so, hitting the landing Northeast plane.

=== Hijackings ===
Between 1961 and 1980, 22 (attempted) hijackings on board National Airlines occurred, which involved the aircraft being demanded to be flown to Cuba. In 1969 alone, there were nine such occurrences. These events can be partly attributed to the tense Cuba–United States relations at that time, and the many flights of National Airlines in and to the southeastern United States, near Cuba. See List of Cuba – United States aircraft hijackings for more information.

There were several other criminal acts involving National Airlines aircraft:

- On March 8, 1971, a hijacker on board Flight 745, a Boeing 727 with 46 occupants en route from Mobile to New Orleans, demanded the aircraft be flown to Canada instead.
- On July 12, 1972, Michael Stanley Green and Ethiopian national Lulseged Tesfa hijacked National Airlines Flight 496 (a Boeing 727) while en route to New York from Philadelphia.
- On March 30, 1974, following a hostage taking in Sarasota, the perpetrator tried to hijack a parked National Airlines 727 at Sarasota-Brandenton Airport, but was prevented from doing so by a flight engineer. A similar hijacking attempt happened on January 3, 1975, at Pensacola Airport.

== See also ==
- List of defunct airlines of the United States
- WPST-TV, a defunct television station in Miami, Florida, owned and operated by the airline from 1957 to 1961

== Bibliography ==
- Banning, Eugene (2001). Davies, R.E.G. (ed.). Airliners of Pan American since 1927. Paladwr Press. ISBN 1-888962-17-8.
- Bender, M.; Altschul, S. (1982). The chosen instrument. New York (N.Y.): Simon & Schuster.
- Cearley, G.W. (1995). National-Airline of the stars. Dallas (TX): Airline Historical Publications.
- Conrad, Barnaby (1999). Pan Am: An Aviation Legend. Emeryville, CA: Woodford Press. ISBN 0-942627-55-5.
- Daley, R. (1980). An American saga. New York (N.Y.): Random House.
- Davies, R.E.G (1982) [1972]. Airlines of the United States Since 1914 (Revised ed.). Putnam. ISBN 0-370-30942-1.
- Davies, R.E.G. (1987). Pan Am: An Airline and Its Aircraft. Illustrated by Mike Machat. New York (N.Y.): Orion Books. ISBN 0-517-56639-7.
- Gandt, Robert L. (1995). Skygods: The Fall of Pan Am. New York: Morrow & Co. ISBN 0-688-04615-0.
- Ladd Smith, H. (1965). Airways-The history of commercial aviation in the United States. Russell & Russell.
- Solberg, C. (1979). Conquest of the skies. Boston: Little, Brown & Co.
- Szurovy, G. (2003). Classic American airlines. St. Paul (MN): Motorbooks International/MBI Publishing Co.
- Whitehouse, A. (1971). The sky’s the limit-A history of the U.S. airlines. New York (N.Y.): The Macmillan Co.
- Williams, B. (1970). The anatomy of an airline. Garden City (N.Y.): Doubleday & Co.
- World Airline Record. Chicago (IL): Roadcap & Ass. 1948.
- The Clipper Heritage: Pan American World Airways 1927-1991. Pan American Historical Foundation. 2005.
- Pan American World Airways Records. Otto G. Richter Library, University of Miami Archives. June 26, 1996.
