= National Airlines Flight 83 =

1951 aviation accident

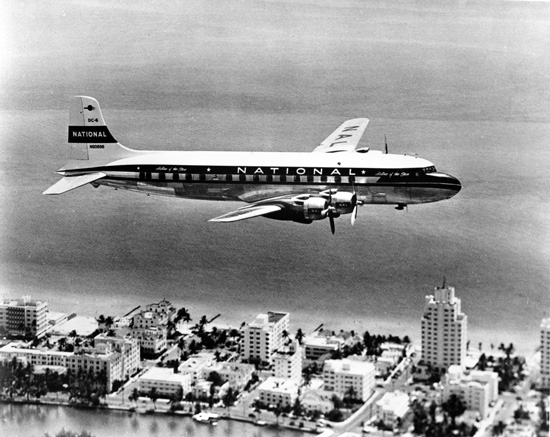
- A DC-4 similar to the accident aircraft

Accident
- Date: 14 January 1951
- Summary: Over-shoot on icy runway, resulting in a fire
- Site: Philadelphia International Airport, Philadelphia, Pennsylvania, U.S.; 39°52′20.17″N 75°14′14.89″W

Aircraft
- Aircraft type: Douglas DC-4
- Operator: National Airlines
- Registration: N74685
- Flight origin: Newark International Airport (EWR/KEWR)
- Destination: Philadelphia International Airport (PHL/KPHL)
- Passengers: 25
- Crew: 3
- Fatalities: 7
- Injuries: 11
- Survivors: 21

National Airlines Flight 83 was a United States domestic flight from Newark International Airport, serving New York City, to Philadelphia. On January 14, 1951, the Douglas DC-4 of National Airlines crashed on landing at Philadelphia International Airport. The aircraft over-shot the runway, ran into a ditch and caught fire. Of the 28 people on board, 7 were killed and 11 injured. One of the dead was the lone flight attendant, Frankie Housley, who had gone back into the burning aircraft to try to save more passengers.

== Crash ==
On arrival at Philadelphia International Airport, the pilots tried to land the aircraft too far down the runway, instead of aborting the approach. The runway was icy; the aircraft over-shot, running through a fence and into a ditch. The left wing broke off, rupturing the gasoline tanks, and the airplane caught fire. Of 28 people on board, including 3 crew, 7 were killed, including two infants and the one flight attendant on board.

== Frankie Housley ==
Mary Frances "Frankie" Housley was the lone flight attendant on the flight. She opened the emergency door and saw the ground eight feet below. Returning to the cabin, she helped passengers release their seat belts, guided them to the door and gave a gentle shove to those who were hesitant to jump. After seeing 10 people to safety, she returned to the cabin to try to rescue a baby. After the fire was extinguished, the bodies of five women and two infants were found, including Housley with a four-month-old infant in her arms.
