= Frankie Housley =

American flight attendant

- Born: Mary Frances Housley; October 12, 1926; Knoxville, Tennessee
- Died: January 14, 1951 (aged 24); Philadelphia, Pennsylvania
- Cause of death: Plane crash
- Resting place: Knoxville, Tennessee
- Education: Central High School (Knoxville, Tennessee)
- Occupation: Flight attendant
- Employer: National Airlines
- Known for: Heroism after plane crash

Mary Frances "Frankie" Housley (October 12, 1926 – January 14, 1951) was the lone flight attendant on National Airlines Flight 83, which crashed after landing at Philadelphia International Airport on January 14, 1951. She led 10 passengers to safety, then returned to the burning cabin to save an infant. She died in the attempt and was later found holding the four-month-old baby in her arms.

== Early life ==
Mary Frances "Frankie" Housley was born in Knoxville, Tennessee, the daughter of John H. Housley and Fannie Mayer Housley. She grew up in Fountain City and attended Central High School, where she was a member of the Bowling Club, Commercial Club, Science Club, and Glee Club, and a member of the honor society. She attended the University of Tennessee for one year and pledged Sigma Kappa sorority, but left to get married. She was soon divorced, then worked as an office assistant for doctors in Jacksonville, Florida. In 1950, she applied for a job as a flight attendant with National Airlines (1934–1980), and was hired the next day.

== The crash ==
At 2:13pm, January 14, 1951, National's Flight 83, a DC-4, landed in Philadelphia from Newark, New Jersey, en route to Norfolk, Virginia. It skidded off the icy runway, through a fence, and into a ditch. The left wing broke off, rupturing the gasoline tanks, and the plane caught fire. Housley opened the emergency door and saw the ground eight feet below. Returning to the cabin, she helped passengers release their seat belts, guided them to the door and gave a gentle shove to those who were hesitant to jump. After saving 10 passengers, she returned to the cabin to try to rescue a four-month-old baby. After the fire was extinguished, the bodies of five women and two infants were found, including Housley with a baby in her arms.

== Aftermath ==
National Airlines installed a plaque in Housley's honor at Variety Children's Hospital in Miami. She was posthumously awarded the Carnegie Medal from the Carnegie Hero Fund in 1951. There is a memorial to her in front of the Engine 78 firehouse at Philadelphia International Airport. Entertainer Eddie Cantor performed a benefit show in Jacksonville to raise money for a new wing of the Hope Haven Hospital for Crippled Children to be named in Housley's honor. The Knoxville chapter of the Shriners dedicated a room in the Crippled Children’s Hospital to Frankie Housley. Fifteen years later, Reader's Digest published A Girl Named Frankie; its author, MacKinlay Kantor, called her "the Bravest Woman In America." She was inducted into the Florida Aviation Hall of Fame in 2016. The bridge on Holbrook Drive in her hometown of Fountain City, Tennessee, was named in her honor in 2017. On October, 9, 2020, a Tennessee State Historical Marker (1E 136) was unveiled in her honor near the corner of Forestal Drive and Tazewell Pike in Fountain City.

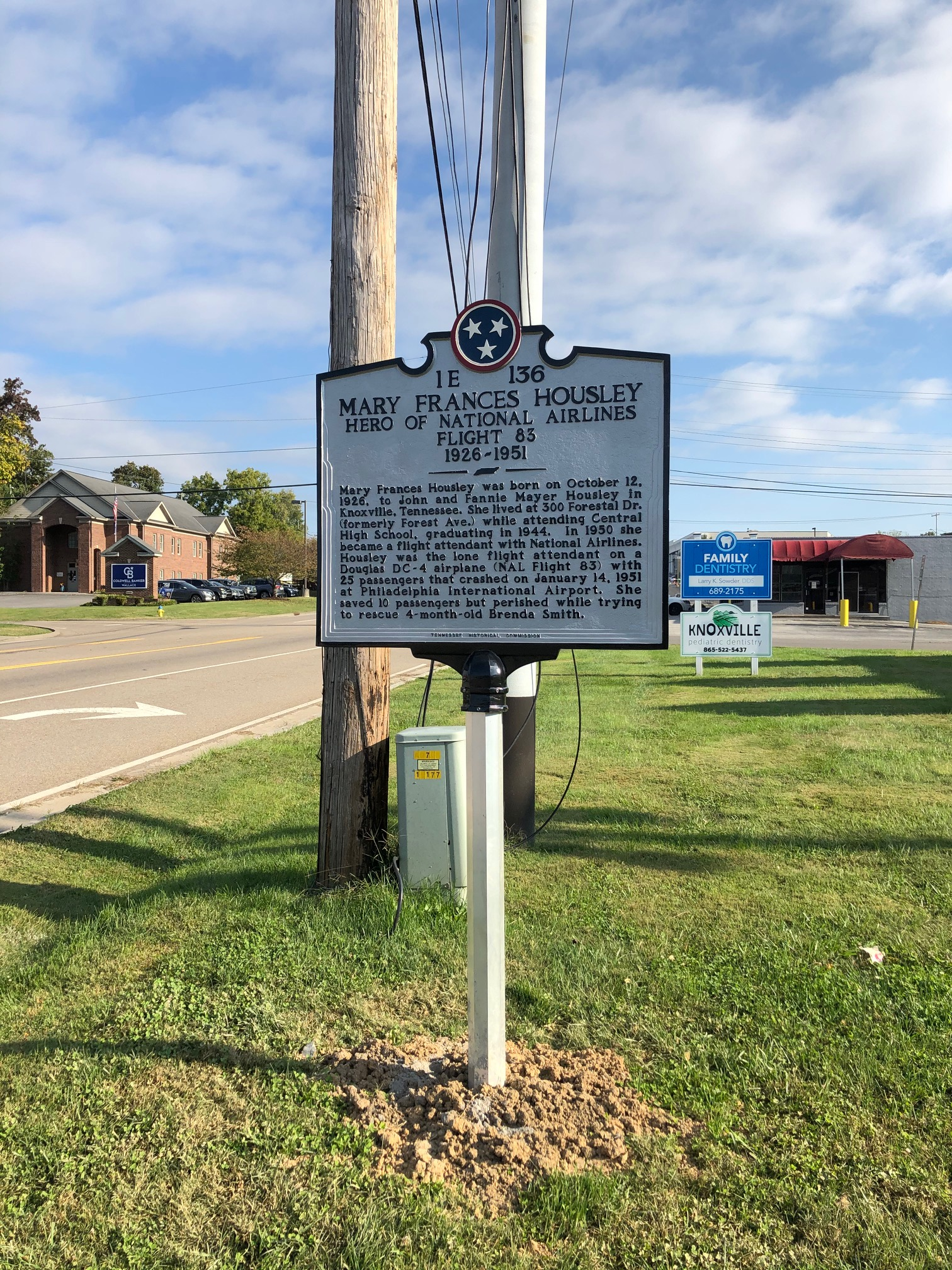
Mary Frances Housley Tennessee State Historical Marker (1E 136) located near the corner of Forestal Drive and Tazewell Pike in Knoxville, Tennessee.

== In popular culture ==
In September, 1951, her story was adapted into a comic book and she was featured on the cover of New Heroic Comics issue number 68, published by Eastern Color Printing.

== See also ==
- Neerja Bhanot
- Barbara Jane Harrison
