= National Airlines Flight 16 =

1945 aviation accident

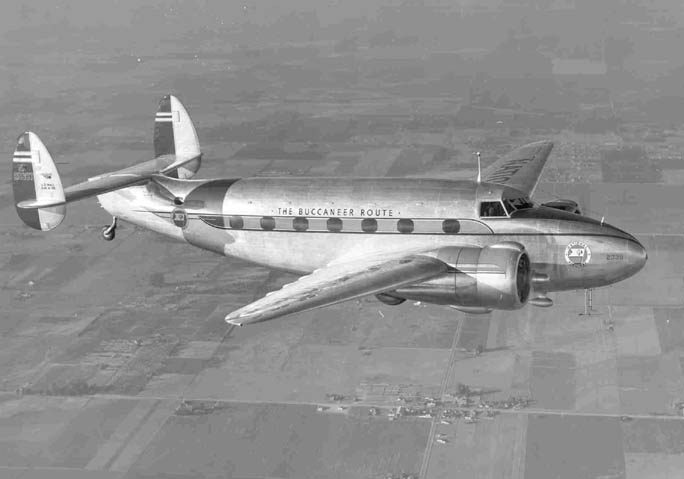
- A National Airlines Lockheed 18 Lodestar, similar to the one involved in the accident

Accident
- Date: October 5, 1945
- Summary: Pilot error
- Site: Lakeland, Florida; 27°59′20″N 082°01′07″W

Aircraft
- Aircraft type: Lockheed 18-50 Lodestar
- Operator: National Airlines
- Registration: NC18199
- Flight origin: Miami, Florida
- 1st stopover: Fort Myers, Florida
- 2nd stopover: Sarasota, Florida
- 3rd stopover: St Petersburg, Florida
- 4th stopover: Tampa, Florida
- Destination: Lakeland Municipal Airport
- Occupants: 15
- Passengers: 12
- Crew: 3
- Fatalities: 2
- Survivors: 13

National Airlines Flight 16 was a domestic (U.S.), scheduled passenger flight from Miami, Florida, to Lakeland, Florida, that crashed on October 5, 1945. The aircraft was on the last leg of a Miami-Fort Myers-Sarasota-St Petersburg-Tampa-Lakeland route. The cause of the crash was determined to be a faulty missed approach procedure, which caused the aircraft to overshoot the runway and land in Lake Parker approximately 1,000 feet (300 m) beyond. Two passengers drowned, and several others were injured.

== Aircraft and crew ==
Flight 16 was serviced by a Lockheed Lodestar 18-50 that had been manufactured in 1942 for the US Army Air Corps. The aircraft was owned by the Defense Plant Corporation, and was leased to National Airlines. The airframe had accumulated a total of 1798 hours of airtime, 628 hours of which had occurred since its last overhaul. The aircraft was one of only 13 Lodestar 18-50s variants built out of a total of 625 Lodestar 18's.

The aircraft was piloted by Captain William Merrill Corry, an employee of National Airlines since November 1943. Captain Corry had a total of 4800 hours of flight time, and 851 hours on a Lockheed 18–50. The copilot was First Officer William Hawley Conrad, an employee of National Airlines since May 7, 1945. First Officer Conrad had 5247 hours of flight time, with 409 on a Lockheed 18–50. The stewardess was Ethel Katherine McCoy.

== Flight and crash ==
The aircraft, a Lockheed 18-50 Lodestar, departed Miami at 9:12 p.m. on October 4, 1945, 1 hour, 15 minutes behind schedule due to delays in previous flights. The flight progressed normally during stops at Fort Myers, Sarasota, St. Petersburg, and Tampa. The plane departed Tampa at 12:45 a.m. and continued towards Lakeland.

Lakeland reported 9 miles of visibility with scattered clouds at 500 feet (150 m). At 12:58 a.m., at seven miles from the airfield, the pilots established a straight-in descent to the northeastern runway. The descent continued normally until the aircraft reached 600 feet (180 m), when the aircraft abruptly entered an unexpected cloud. This prompted the captain to retract the landing gear and tell the first officer that he was going to initiate a missed approach, and go around for a second attempt at landing.

Witnesses on the ground observed that the aircraft continued along the runway at approximately 30 to 40 feet (9.1 to 12.2 m) above the surface. It passed the end of the runway and struck the surface of the Lake Parker adjacent to the Lakeland airport approximately 1,000 feet (300 m) beyond the end of the runway. The aircraft skipped an additional 1,000 feet (300 m), shedding fuselage covering as it went, before sinking in 10 feet (3.0 m) of water.

Two passengers drowned. All other occupants escaped from the wreckage and were rescued by locals within thirty minutes.

== Investigation ==
Civil Aeronautics Board investigators examined the wreckage and determined that there had been no malfunction or failure of aircraft equipment. The condition of the wreckage indicated that the plane had first struck the water in a level bellyflop.

The Civil Aeronautics Board determined that:

Testimony of the flight personnel and the results of pilot check flights conducted by the CAB and company check pilots subsequent to the hearing revealed a definite lack of familiarity of some National Airlines' captains with the operating limitation of the Lodestar. Although legally qualified to pilot the aircraft, their proficiency was not in conformance with accepted standards. ... The company training program and training facilities were inadequate for the maintenance of sufficient competency of pilot personnel with respect to the Lockheed 18-50.

— Civil Aeronautics Board, Docket #SA-108. File #3452-45

Because of the captain's unfamiliarity with the aircraft specifications, he waited too long to commit himself to the go-around procedure, dooming the aircraft as immediate action was necessary. The CAB also determined that the pilot had available alternative procedures which would have enabled him to complete the maneuver safely. The cause of the crash was ultimately determined to be due to pilot error.
