= Philadelphia International Airport =

Airport in Philadelphia, Pennsylvania, United States

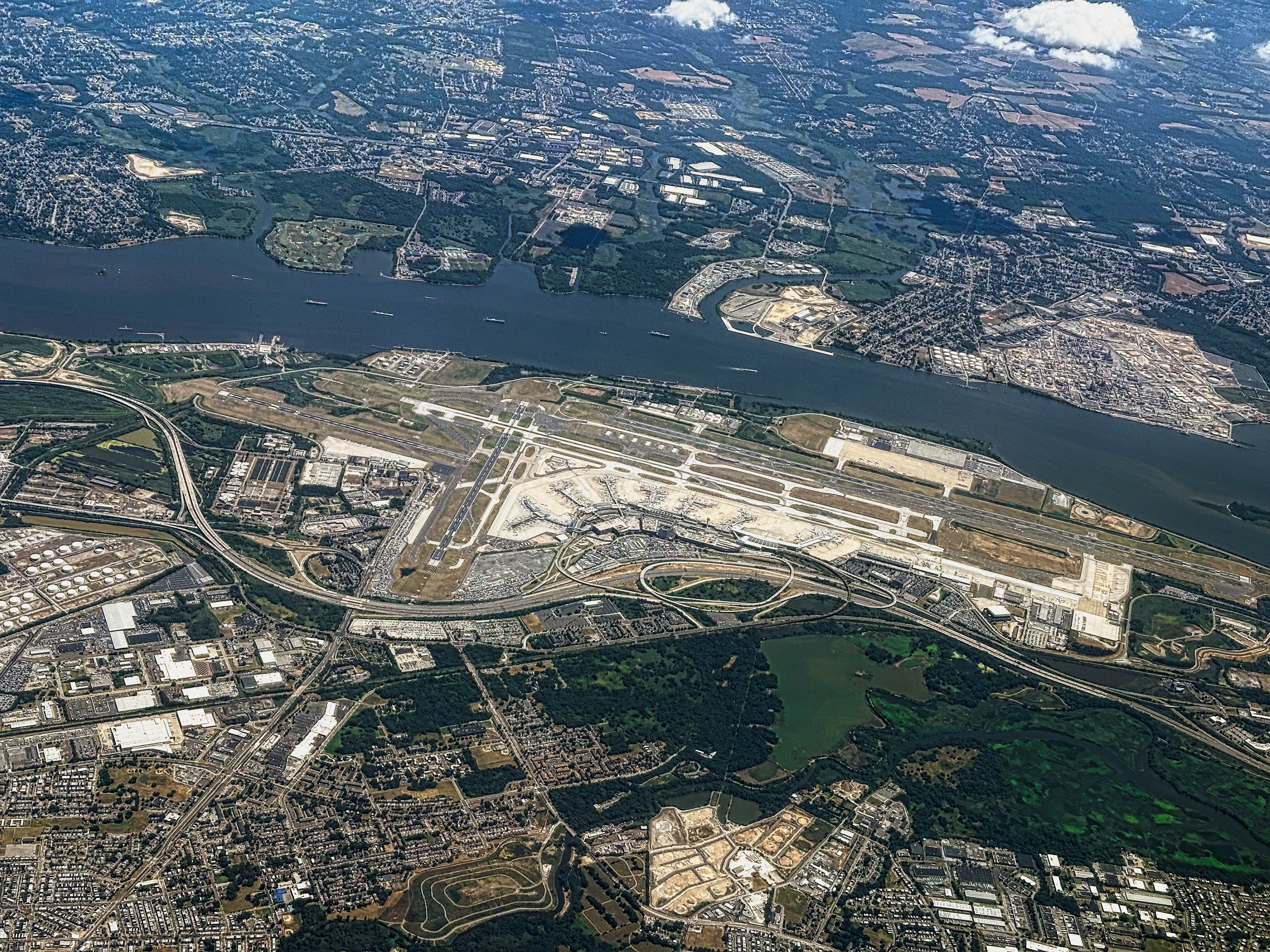
- Aerial view of Philadelphia International Airport in June 2024, looking southeast
- IATA: PHL; ICAO: KPHL; FAA LID: PHL; WMO: 72408

Summary
- Airport type: Public
- Owner/Operator: Philadelphia Department of Aviation
- Serves: Philadelphia metropolitan area; South Jersey
- Location: Philadelphia/Tinicum Township, Delaware County, Pennsylvania, U.S.
- Opened: June 20, 1940; 86 years ago
- Hub for: American Airlines; UPS Airlines
- Operating base for: Frontier Airlines
- Built: 1925; 101 years ago
- Time zone: EST (UTC−05:00)
  - Summer (DST): EDT (UTC−04:00)
- Elevation AMSL: 11 m (36 ft)
- Coordinates: 39°52′19″N 075°14′28″W
- Website: www.phl.org

Maps
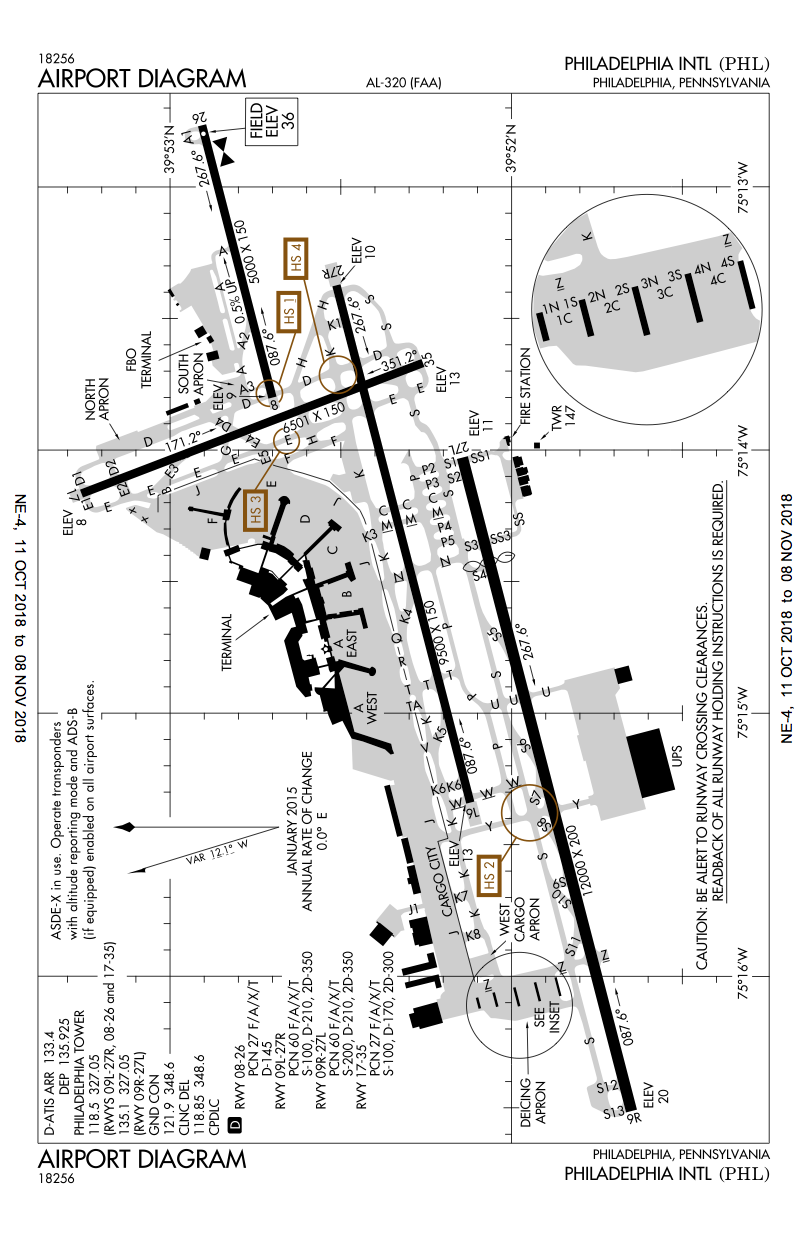
- FAA airport diagram
- Interactive map of Philadelphia International Airport

Runways
Direction	Length		Surface
Direction	m	ft	Surface
8/26	1,524	5,001	Asphalt
9L/27R	2,896	9,500	Asphalt
9R/27L	3,658	12,000	Asphalt
17/35	1,981	6,500	Asphalt

Statistics (2025)
- Aircraft operations: 323,122
- Passengers: 30,136,790 ▼2.5%
- Total cargo (metric tons): 482,483.6
- Source: PHL Airport Federal Aviation Administration

Philadelphia International Airport (IATA: PHL, ICAO: KPHL, FAA LID: PHL) is the primary international airport serving Philadelphia, Pennsylvania, United States. It served 30.1 million passengers annually in 2025, making it the busiest airport in Pennsylvania and the 21st-busiest airport in the United States. The airport is located 7 miles (11 km) from Center City Philadelphia and has 22 airlines that offer nearly 500 daily departures to more than 130 destinations worldwide.

The airport is the fifth-largest hub for American Airlines and serves as American Airlines' primary hub in the Northeastern United States and its primary European and transatlantic gateway. The airport is also a regional cargo hub for UPS Airlines and a focus city for Frontier Airlines. The airport has service to cities in the United States, Canada, Mexico, the Caribbean, Europe, and the Middle East. As of 2019, the airport offers flights to 140 destinations, 102 of which are domestic and 38 of which international.

Much of the airport property is in the city of Philadelphia. Terminal A, the international terminal, and the western and southern ends of the airfield are in Tinicum Township, Delaware County. PHL covers 2,302 acres (932 ha) and has four runways.

Philadelphia International Airport is an important component of the economies of the Philadelphia metropolitan area, and Pennsylvania. The Commonwealth's Aviation Bureau reported in its Pennsylvania Air Service Monitor that the total economic impact made by the state's airports in 2004 was $22 billion. In 2017, the airport commissioned a new economic impact report, which found that it accounted for $15.4 billion in economic activity, $5.4 billion in total earnings, and over 96,000 direct and indirect jobs. In October 2022, the airport gained a direct connection to a Colonial Pipeline fuel supply.

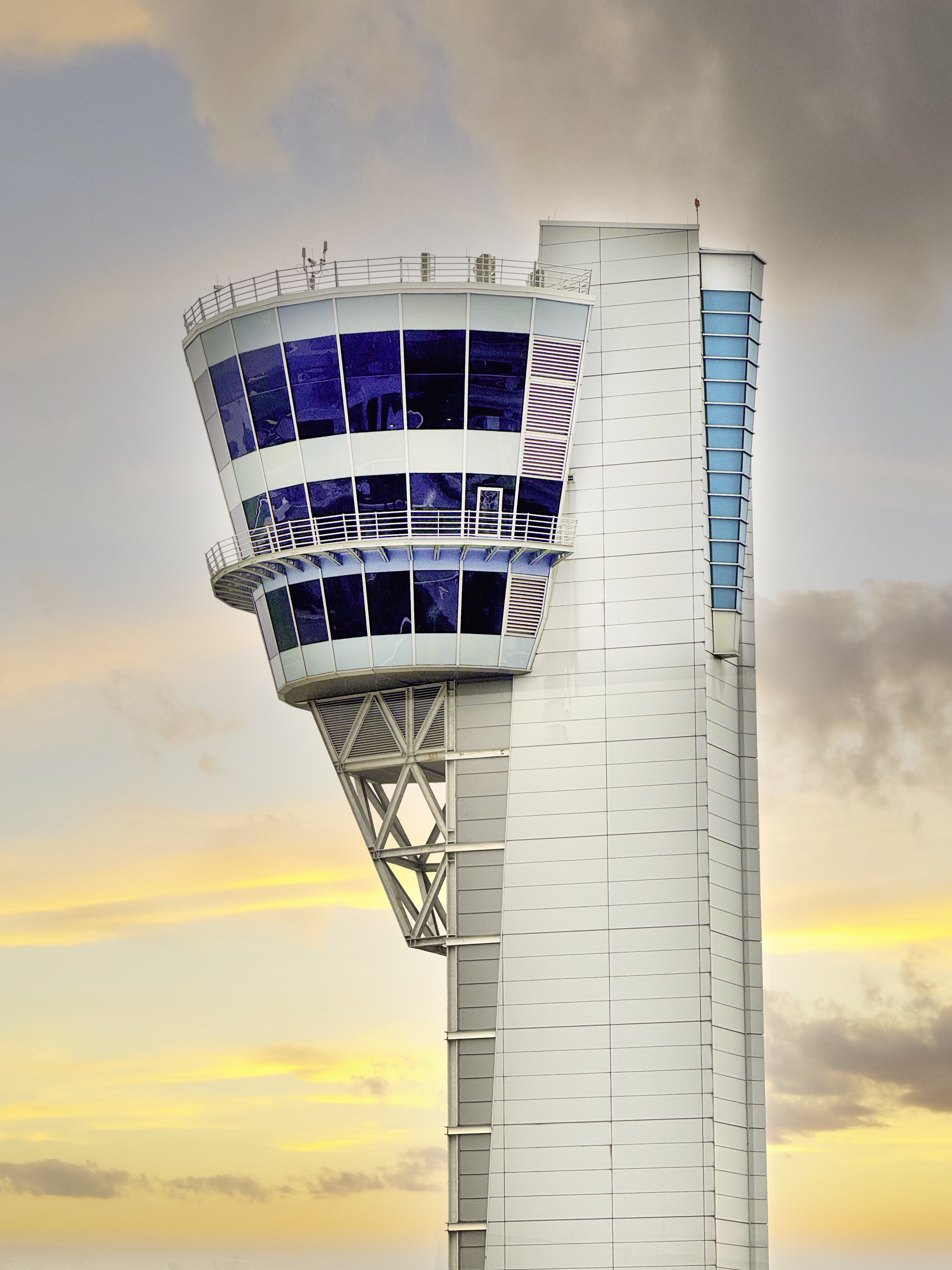
The air traffic control tower at Philadelphia International Airport

== History ==
=== 20th century ===
Starting in 1925, the Pennsylvania National Guard used the present airport site (known as Hog Island) as a training airfield. The site was dedicated as the "Philadelphia Municipal Airport" by Charles Lindbergh in 1927, but it had no proper terminal building until 1940; airlines used Camden Central Airport in nearby Pennsauken Township, New Jersey. Once Philadelphia's terminal was completed (on the east side of the field) American, Eastern, TWA, and United moved their operations here.

In 1947 and 1950, the airport had runways 4, 9, 12 and 17, all 5,400 feet (1,600 m) or less. In 1956 runway 9 was 7,284 feet (2,220 m); in 1959 it was 9,499 feet (2,895 m) and runway 12 was closed. Not much changed until the early 1970s, when runway 4 was closed and 9R opened with 10,500 feet (3,200 m).

On June 20, 1940, the airport's weather station became the official point for Philadelphia weather observations and records by the National Weather Service.

During World War II the United States Army Air Forces used the airport as a First Air Force training airfield.

Beginning in 1940, Rising Sun School of Aeronautics of Coatesville performed primary flight training at the airport under contract to the Air Corps. After the Pearl Harbor Attack, the I Fighter Command Philadelphia Fighter Wing provided air defense of the Philadelphia metropolitan area from the airport. Throughout the war, various fighter and bomber groups were organized and trained at Philadelphia airport and assigned to the Philadelphia Fighter Wing before being sent to advanced training airfields or being deployed overseas. Known units assigned were the 33d, 58th, 355th and 358th Fighter Groups.

In June 1943, I Fighter Command transferred jurisdiction of the airport to the Air Technical Service Command (ATSC). ATSC established a sub-depot of the Middletown Air Depot at the airport. The 855th Army Air Forces Specialized Depot unit repaired and overhauled aircraft and returned them to active service, and the Army Air Forces Training Command established the Philco Training School on January 1, 1943, which trained personnel in radio repair and operations.

In 1945, the Air Force reduced its use of the airport and it was returned to civil control that September.

Philadelphia Municipal became Philadelphia International Airport in 1945, when American Overseas Airlines began direct flights to Europe. A new terminal opened in December 1953; the oldest parts of the present terminal complex (B and C) were built in the late 1950s.

As of April 1957, the airport was providing 30 weekday departures on Eastern, 24 on TWA, 24 on United, 18 on American, 16 on National, 14 on Capital, six on Allegheny, and three on Delta. To Europe, five Pan Am DC-6Bs a week via Idlewild and Boston and two TWA 749As a week via Idlewild; one TWA flight continued to Ceylon. Eastern and National had nonstops to Miami, but the TWA 1049G to LAX that started in 1956 was the only nonstop beyond Chicago. The first scheduled jets were TWA 707s in the summer of 1959. (Note: TWA's 707 to LAX is not in the OAG for July 15; it is in TWA's timetable for August 2.)

Terminal B/C modernization was completed in 1970, Terminal D opened in 1973 and Terminal E in 1977; the $300 million expansion was designed by Arnold Thompson Associates, Inc. and Vincent G. Kling & Associates.

In the 1980s, the airport hosted several hubs. The Airline Deregulation Act of 1978 allowed regional carrier Altair Airlines to create a small hub at PHL using Fokker F-28s. Altair began in 1967 with flights to cities such as Rochester, New York, Hartford, Connecticut and to Florida until it ceased operations in November 1982. In the mid-1980s Eastern Air Lines opened a hub in Concourse C. The airline declined in the late 1980s and sold aircraft and gate leases to Chicago-based Midway Airlines. Midway operated its Philadelphia hub until it ceased operation in 1991. During the 1980s US Airways (then called USAir) built a hub at PHL.

US Airways became the dominant carrier at the airport in the 1980s and 1990s and shifted most of its hub operations from Pittsburgh to Philadelphia in 2003. As of 2013, the airport was US Airways' largest international hub and its second-largest hub overall behind Charlotte. PHL became an American Airlines hub after it completed its merger with US Airways in 2015 and remains one of the airline's biggest hubs, offering an average of 420 departing flights per day to over 100 destinations. In recent years, American has opted to continue expanding at PHL while downsizing its hub at JFK in New York due to greater slot availability, lower operation costs in Philadelphia, and its greater network of connecting flights.

In July 1999, the Pennsylvania Department of Transportation (PennDOT) and several U.S. federal government agencies selected a route for the connecting ramps from Interstate 95 to the Terminal A-West complex, then under development; the agency tried to avoid the John Heinz National Wildlife Refuge at Tinicum. K/B Fund II, the owner of the International Plaza complex, formerly the Scott Paper headquarters Scott Plaza, objected to the proposed routing, saying it would interfere with International Plaza development. It entered a filing in the U.S. Court of Appeals for the Third Circuit to challenge the proposed routing.

=== 21st century ===
In 2000, the airport attempted to acquire the complex for $90 million but Tinicum Township commissioners stopped the deal from going forward, citing concerns of a loss of tax revenue for the township and the Interboro School District, which serves Tinicum and noise pollution concerns.

In 2002 construction on the controversial new entrance ramps went forward. The new ramps eliminated the traffic signal and stop intersections previously encountered by northbound I-95 motorists who had to use Route 291 to the airport. The project consisted of six new bridges, more than 4,300 linear feet of retaining walls, and 7.7 lane miles of new pavement. The project also included new highway lighting, overhead sign structures, landscaping and the paving of Bartram Avenue. Also under the project, PennDOT resurfaced I-95 between Route 420 and Island Avenue and built a truck enforcement and park-and-ride facility. In 2003 Terminal A-West opened, with a 1,500-space parking garage. Construction of the terminal was funded by airport revenue bonds sold by the Philadelphia Authority for Industrial Development.

By 2005 two studies dealt with expanding runway capacity at PHL: the Runway 17–35 Extension Project EIS and the PHL Capacity Enhancement Program EIS. Completed in May 2009, the Runway 17-35 Extension Project extended runway 17–35 to a length of 6,500 ft (2,000 m), extending it at both ends and incorporating the proper runway safety areas. Other changes made with the Runway 17–35 Extension Project included additional taxiways and aprons, relocation of perimeter service roads, and modifications to nearby public roads.

The status of Philadelphia as an international gateway and major hub for American Airlines and the growth of Southwest Airlines and other low-cost carriers have increased passenger traffic to record levels in the mid-2000s; in 2004 28,507,420 passengers flew through Philadelphia, up 15.5% over 2003. In 2005, 31,502,855 passengers flew through PHL, marking a 10% increase since 2004. In 2006, 31,768,272 passengers travelled through PHL, a 0.9% increase. US Airways commenced a nonstop flight to Tel Aviv in July 2009. It operated an Airbus A330 on the route.

In 2011, a nearly 85,000-square-foot mural was completed along the sides of the airport parking garages that face I-95. The design includes images taken from photographs of Philadelphians dancing by local photographer JJ Tiziou. More than 800 people painted the mural over four months.

On November 14, 2019, after a five-year project, extended Runway 27L was dedicated and opened for operations. The runway was extended 1,500 feet to 12,000 feet with several new taxiways to accommodate the newest fleet of large aircraft that are popular on many long-haul flights. Runway 9R/27L, at 12,000 feet is the longest civil runway in all of Pennsylvania.

In 2023, the airport began a $15 million multi-year project to renovate and expand the airport's restroom facilities, funded by a FAA Airport Terminal Program grant included in the federal Infrastructure Investment and Jobs Act that was signed into law by President Joe Biden. The project will construct two new restrooms, five lactation suites, four service animal relief areas, 49 gender neutral restrooms, three adult assisted care restrooms, and upgrade 30 existing restrooms to be compliant with the Americans with Disabilities Act. In 2024, the airport received $20.4 million in federal funds allocated from the Infrastructure Investment and Jobs Act to perform HVAC and electrical system repairs at several terminals, baggage claims and ticket areas, and pedestrian bridges.

== Facilities ==
=== Terminals ===
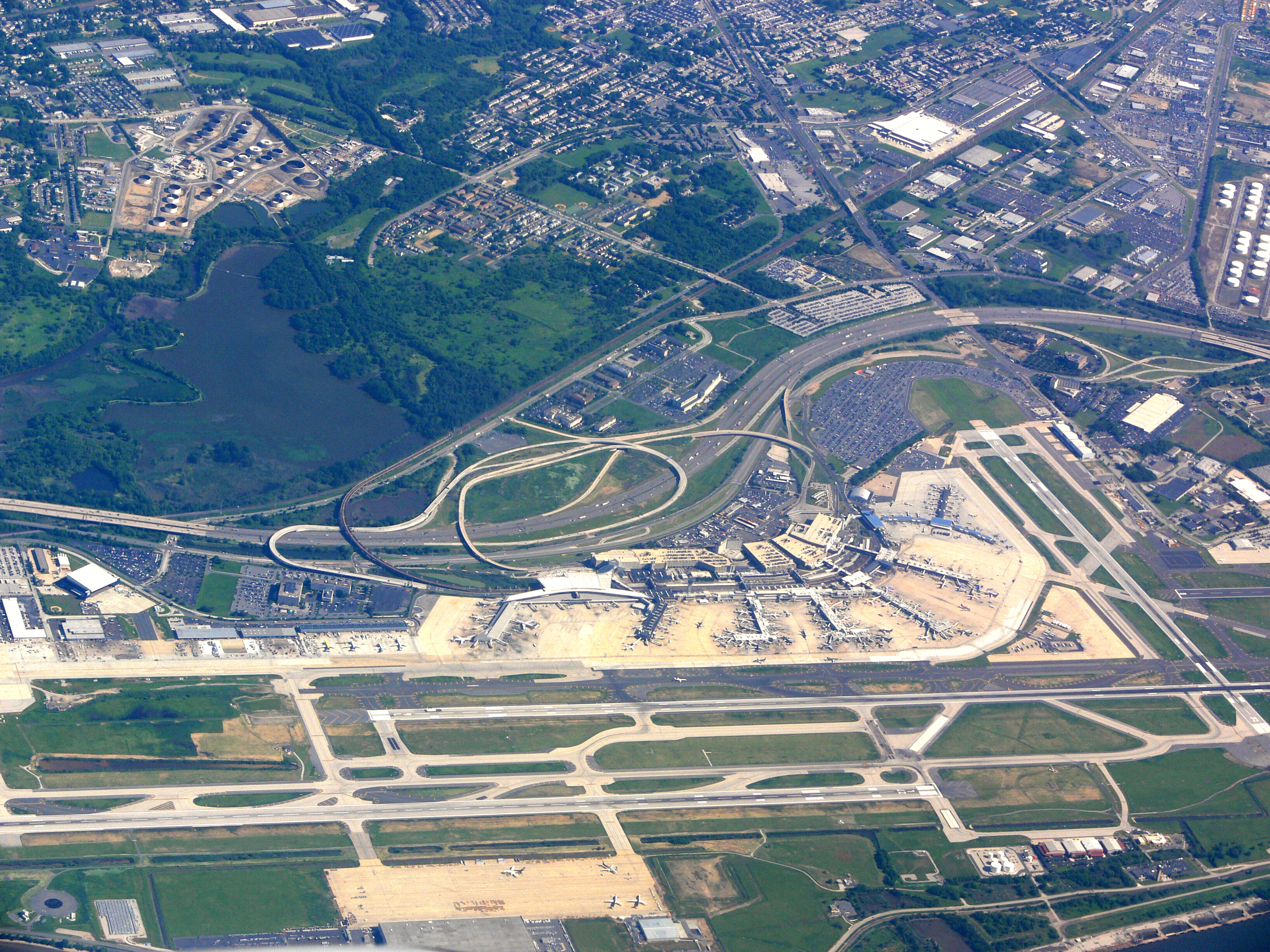
An aerial view of the airport in June 2007

Philadelphia International Airport has six terminals with a total of 126 gates. Non pre-cleared international arrivals are processed in Terminal A. American operates Admirals Clubs in Terminal A, the B/C connector and Terminal F. Terminal A also contains a British Airways Galleries Lounge as well as a American Express Centurion Lounge. Terminal D contains a United Club as well as a Delta Sky Club. A USO lounge is located in Terminal E.

=== Terminal A ===
Terminal A is divided into two sections, east and west. Terminal A West has 13 gates, while Terminal A East has 11 gates. The 800,000 sqft Terminal A West has a modern and innovative design, made by Kohn Pedersen Fox, Pierce Goodwin Alexander & Linville and Kelly/Maiello. Opened in 2003 as the new international terminal, it is now home to American (domestic and international), British Airways, Qatar Airways, and Discover Airlines. Terminal A-West's check-in lobby is located on the first floor, and it has over 60 counters. The ceiling of the check-in lobby extends to the second floor. Terminal A-West offers a variety of international dining options. Passenger Transfer Vehicles (PTVs), also known as Mobile Lounges or "Plane Mates" remain in use to support international flights in A-East and A-West during peak times, when no regular gates are available.

Terminal A East, originally the airport's international terminal, is now used by Aer Lingus, Aeroméxico, and American domestic and international flights as well as international arrivals for Frontier Airlines. A-East is well maintained and received an upgrade to its baggage claim facilities. Most of the gates in this terminal are equipped to handle international arrivals and the passengers are led to the customs facility in Terminal A West. It opened in 1990. The security entrance was significantly enlarged in 2012.

There are four lounges along the corridor between Terminal A East and A West; an American Airlines Admirals Club and Flagship Lounge, British Airways Galleries Lounge and American Express Centurion Lounge. The east terminal also contains an Admirals Club. There is also a children's play area located in the east terminal.

International Arrivals (except from locations with Customs preclearance) arrive at gates in both Terminal A east and west and are processed at the Federal Inspection Facility at the Terminal A West 190 ft over the drop-off ramps and SEPTA tracks. The FIS features 56 Customs and Border Protection inspection booths and 8 baggage carousels. After clearing customs, there is the Arrivals Hall dominated by an atrium, and a 250-ft. long display of the Declaration of Independence, one of several symbols of Philadelphia's identity as America's birthplace. In 2022, the International Arrivals Hall was renamed "Reverend Dr. Leon H. Sullivan International Arrivals Hall" in memory of Leon Sullivan.

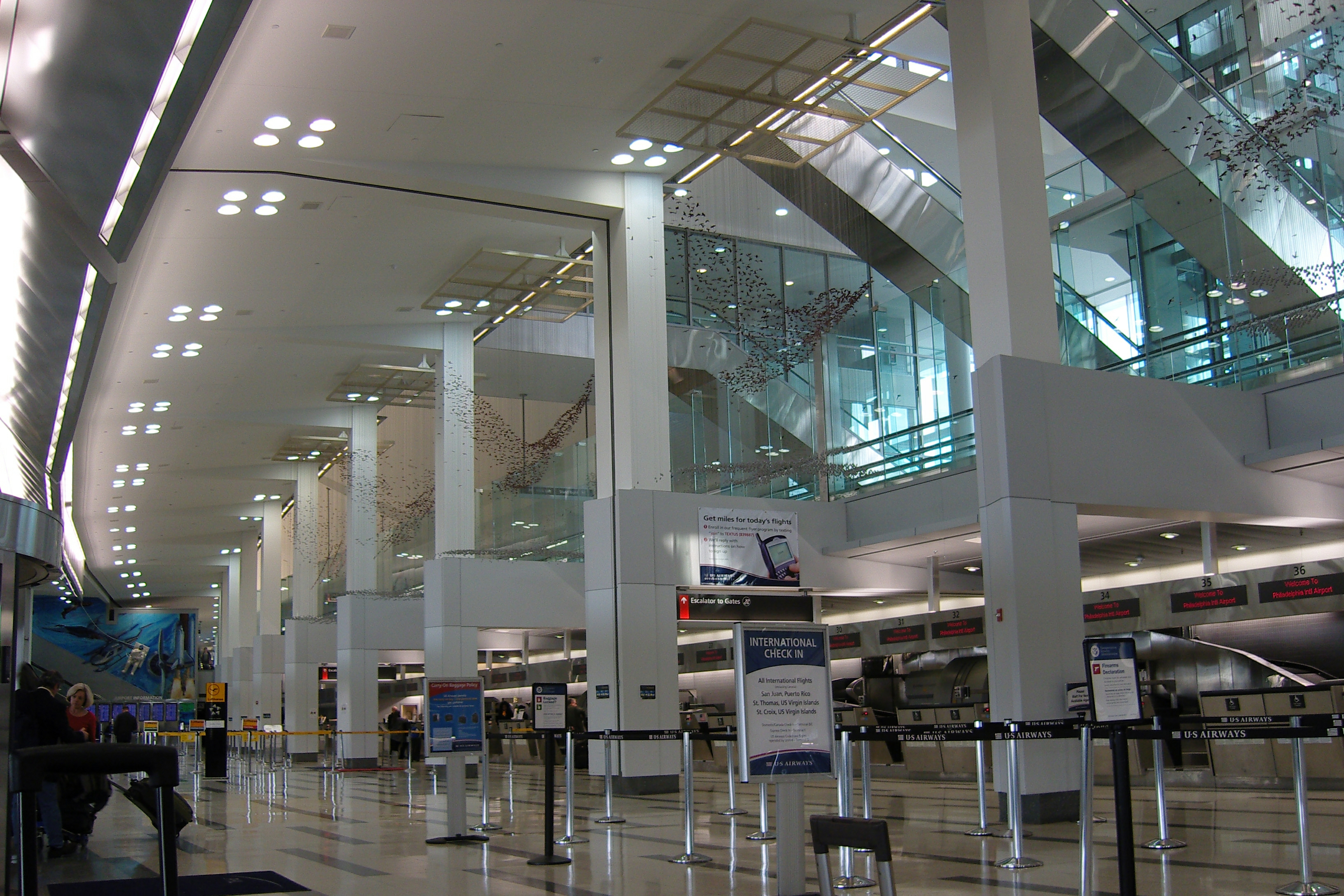
Check-in lobby of Terminal A-West

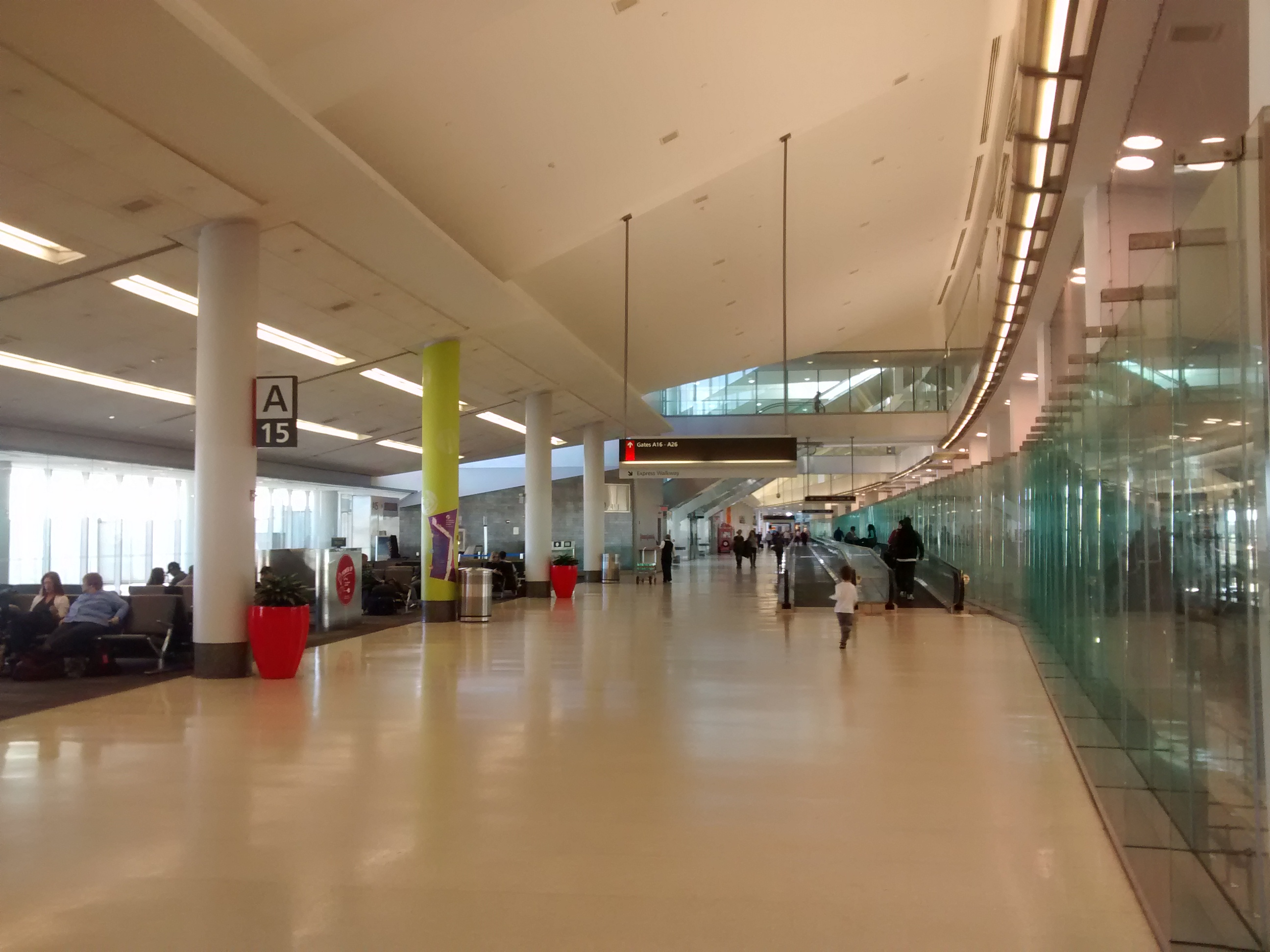
Interior of Terminal A West (airside)

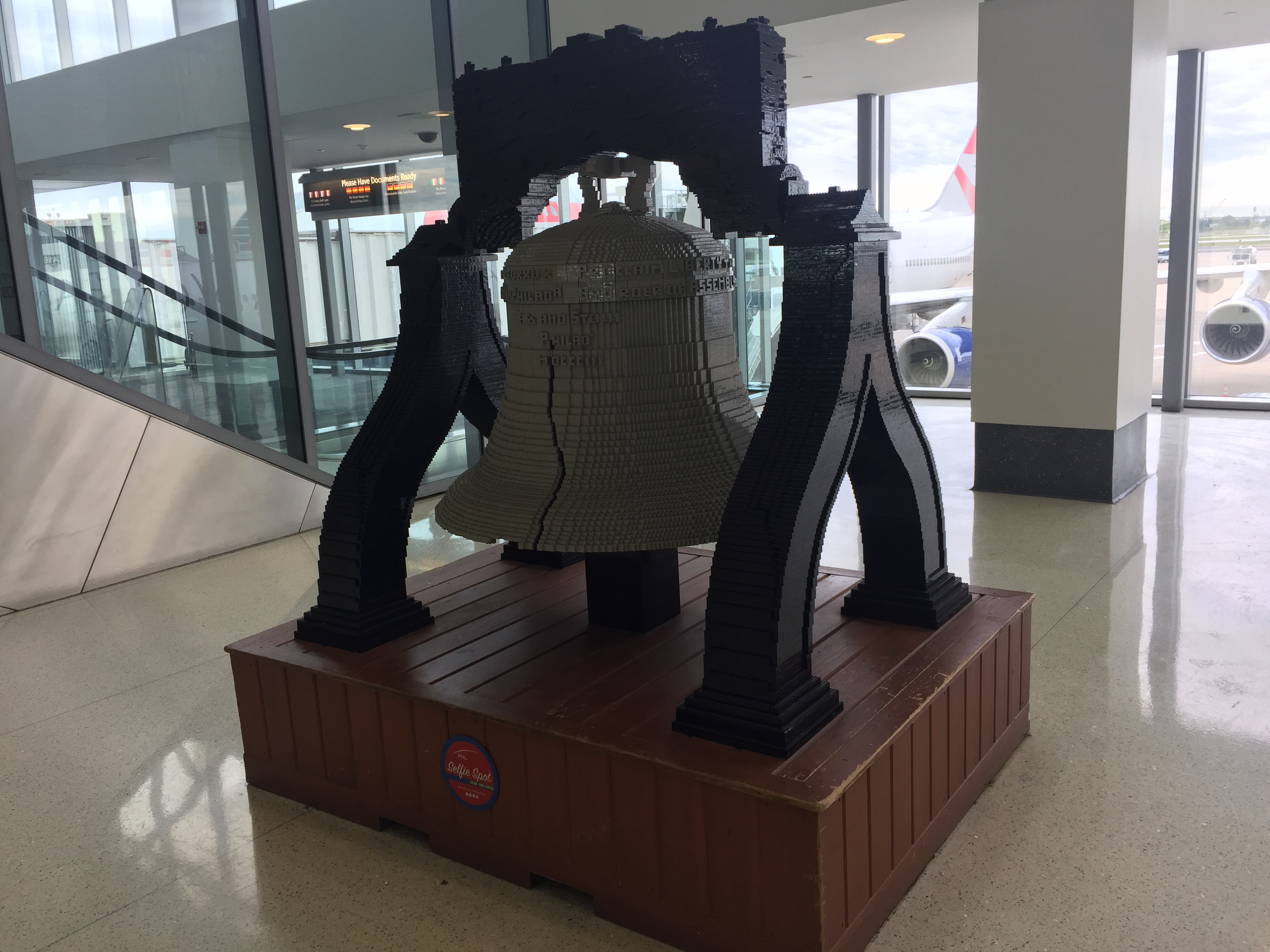
A replica of the Liberty Bell built with LEGO bricks in Terminal A West

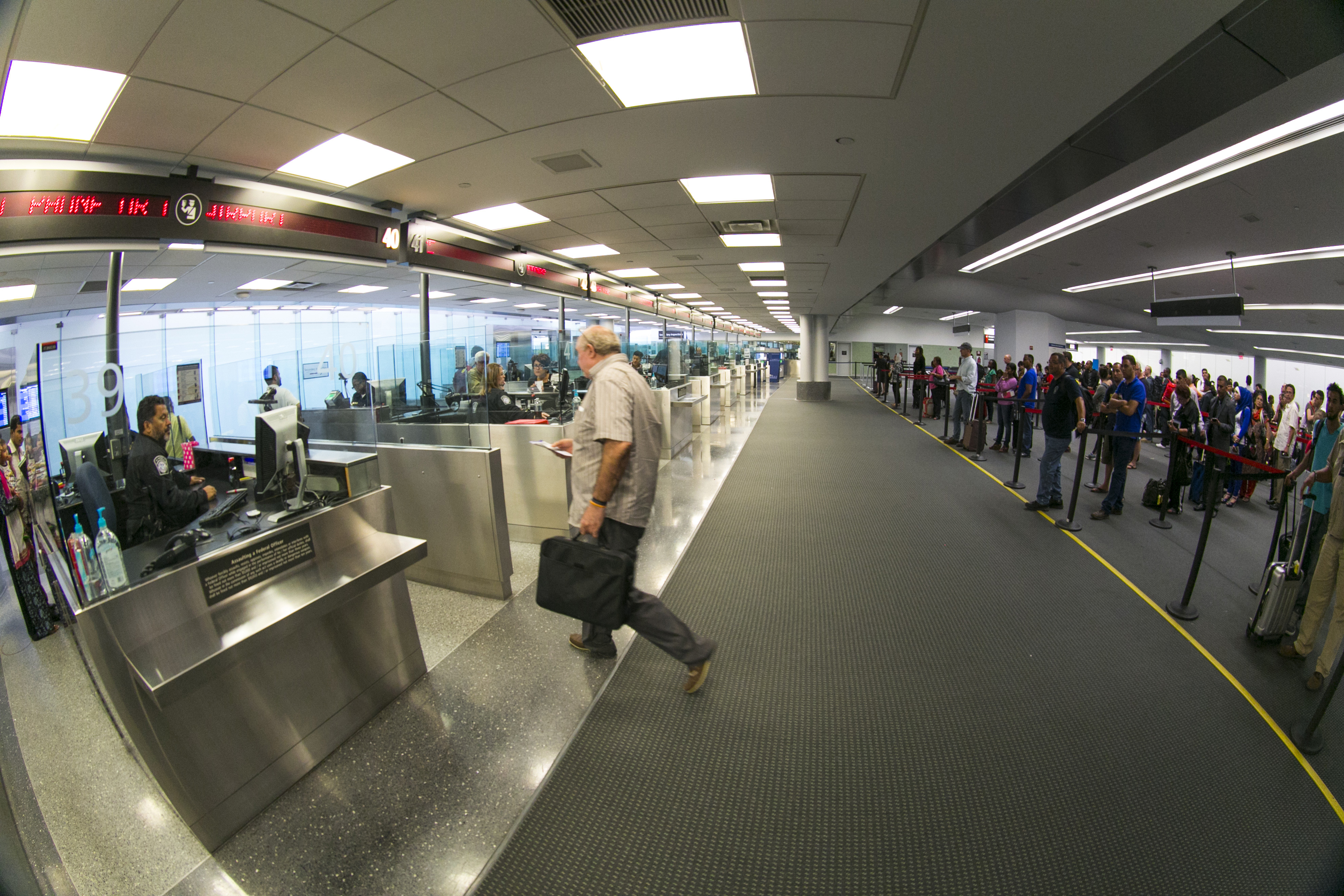
Federal Inspection facilities for international arrival passengers

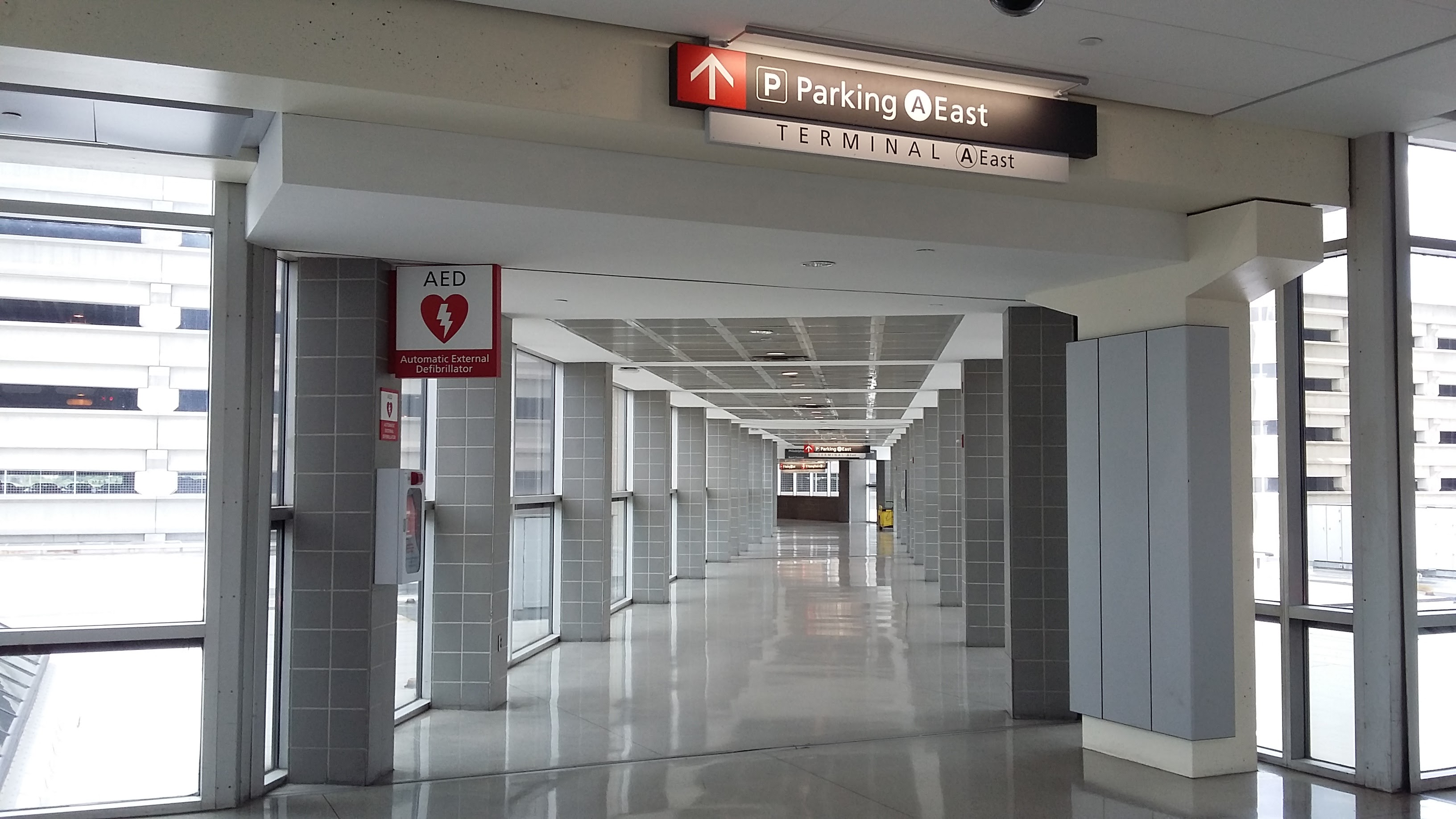
Walkway to the parking garage

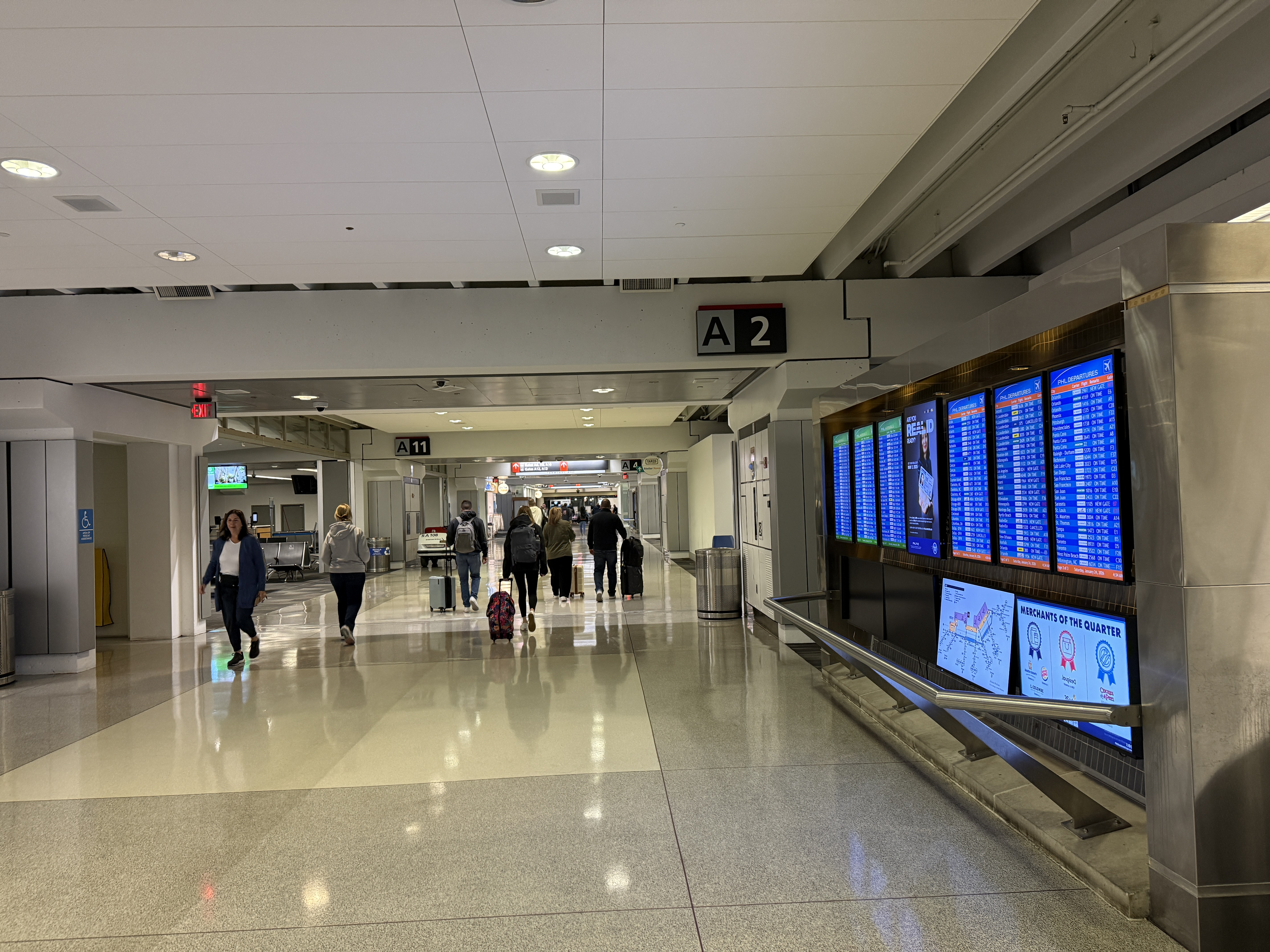
Terminal A East

=== Terminals B and C ===
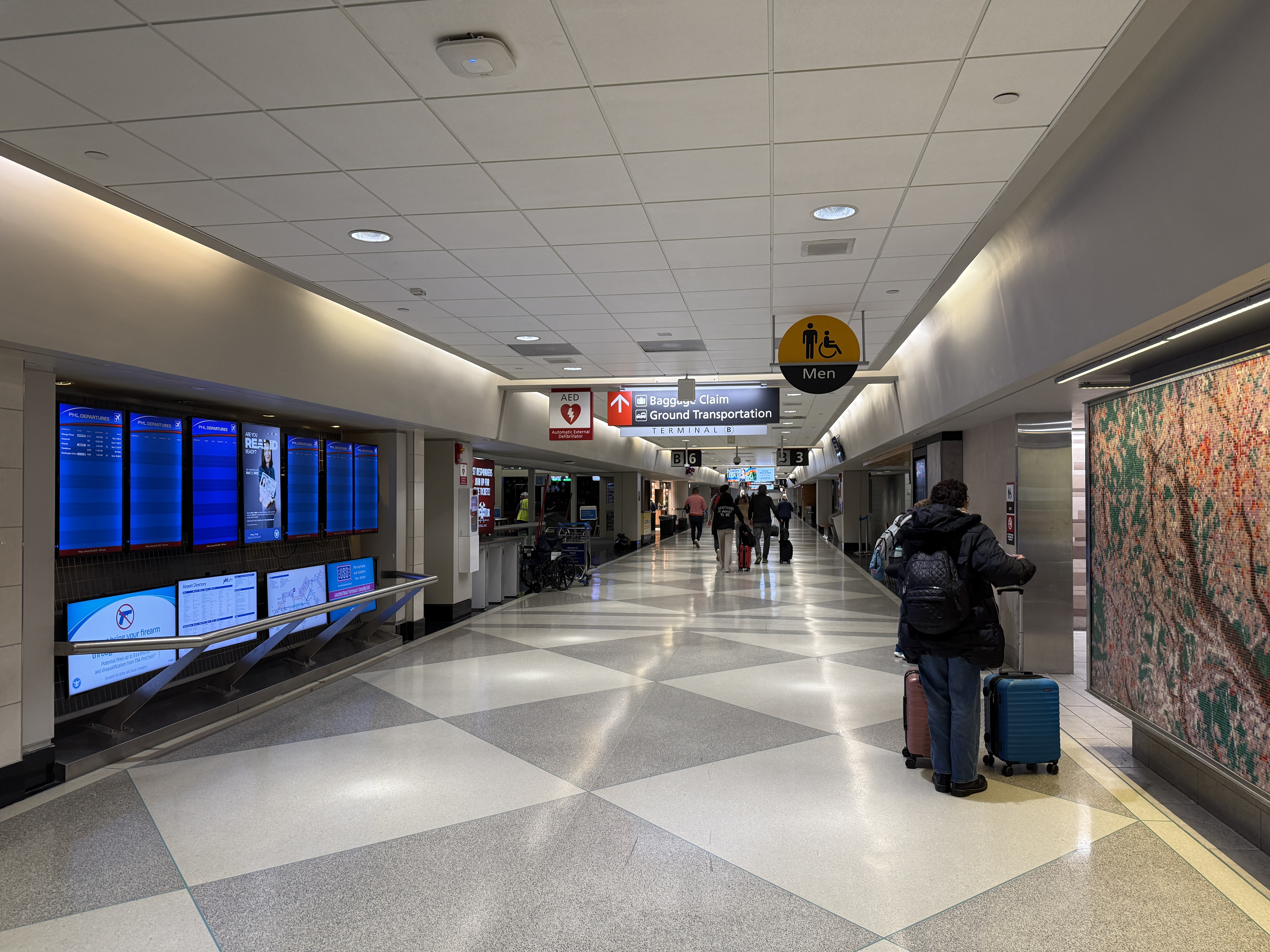
Terminal B

Terminals B and C have 15 and 14 gates respectively. They are the two main terminals used by American. They were renovated at a cost of $135 million in 1998, which was designed by DPK&A Architects, LLP. They are connected by a shopping mall and food court named the Philadelphia Marketplace. Remodeling was done in the gate areas, although these cosmetic changes have not solved the space problems at many of the gates. They are the oldest terminals and opened in 1953. There is an American Airlines Admirals Club located in the B/C connector.

=== Terminals D and E ===
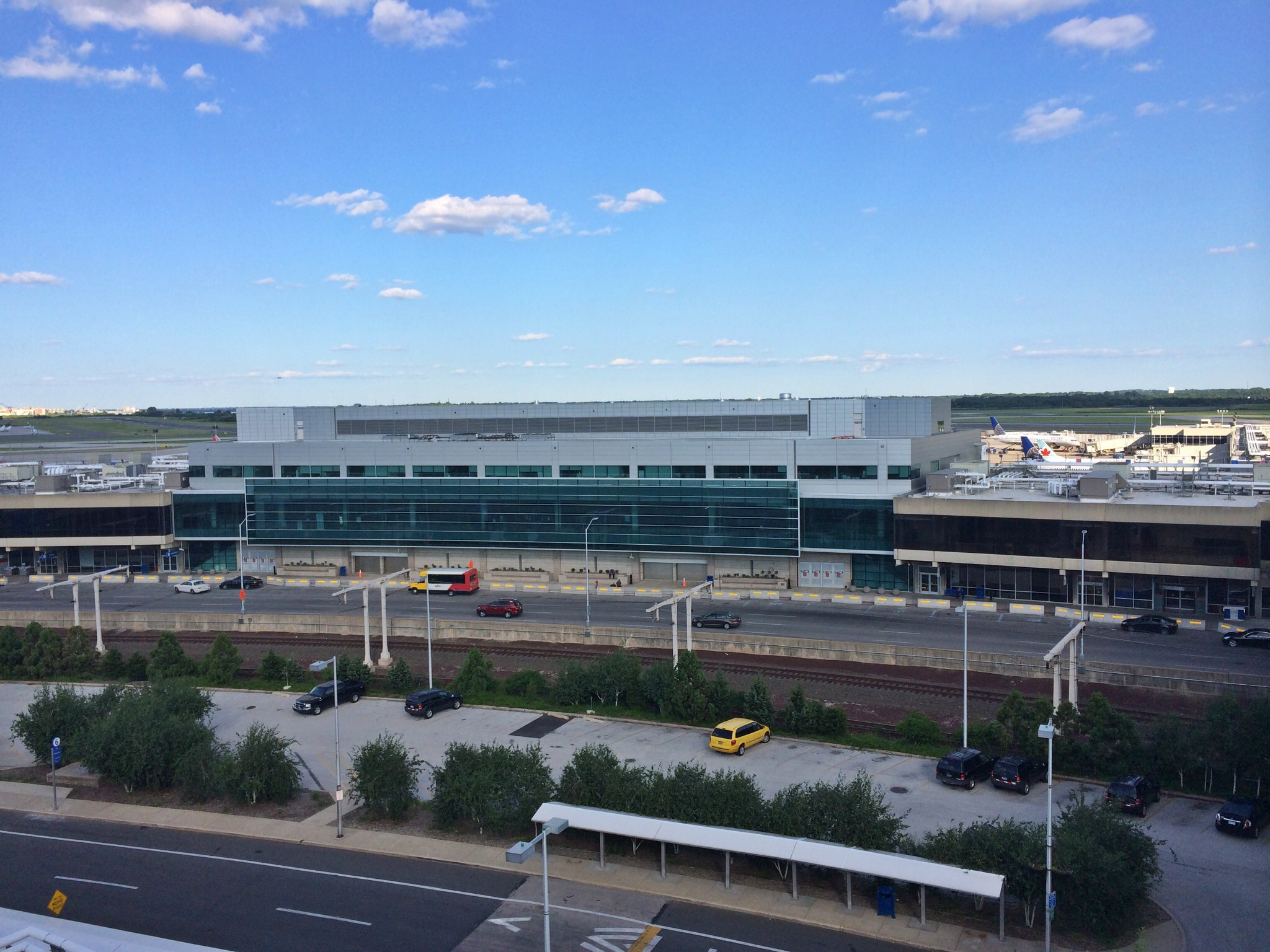
Terminal D/E and Connector, pictured in June 2014

Terminal D has 16 gates; it opened in 1973. Terminal D is home to Air Canada, Delta, and United. This terminal is connected to the shopping area of Terminals B/C through a post-security walkway. The terminal contains a United Club and a Delta Sky Club (recently announced to soon be remodeled and expanded).

Terminal E has 17 gates. It is home to Alaska Airlines (check-in only, departures from D1), Allegiant Air, Frontier, JetBlue (check-in only as of 2022), Southwest, and Sun Country Airlines (check-in only, departures from Terminal D). It opened in 1977, a fan-shaped extension at the end of the concourse was constructed along with the Connector Project in 2008. Terminal E houses a USO lounge available for all members of the military and their families.

The two terminals were connected in late 2008 with a new concourse while providing joint security, a variety of shops and restaurants and a link to Baggage Claims D and E. This is the inverse of the connector between Terminals B and C, which comprises a combined ticket hall but separate security facilities.

A new Chase Sapphire Lounge by The Club opened in the Terminal D/E connector concourse with a 20,000-square-foot (1,858 m^{2}) facility, one of the largest in its collection.

=== Terminal F ===
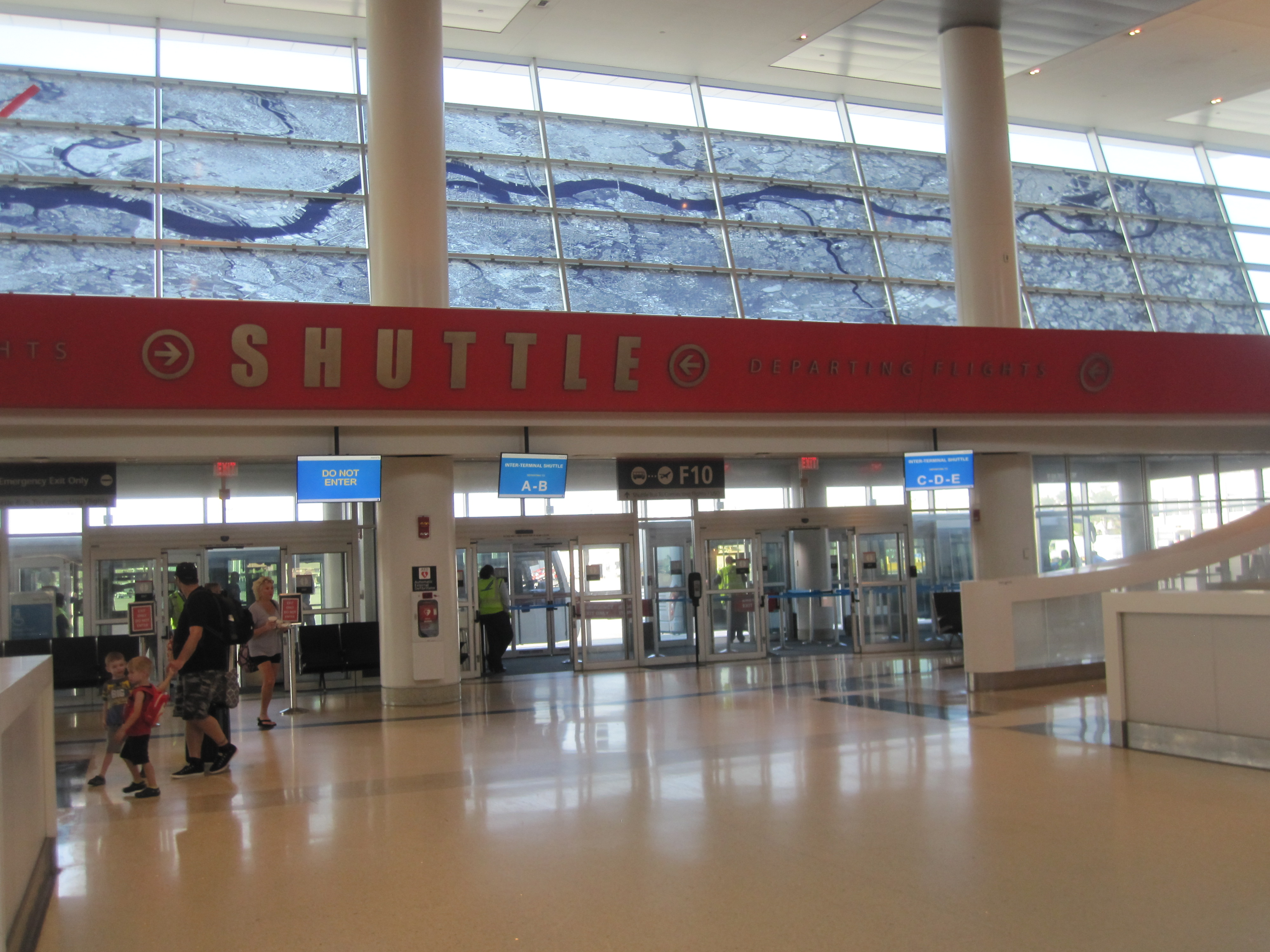
The shuttle stop at Terminal F, pictured in August 2022

Terminal F has 38 gates. The terminal is a regional terminal used by American Eagle flights. It includes special jet bridges that allow passengers to board regional jets without walking on the apron. Opened in 2001, Terminal F is the second newest terminal building at PHL. It was designed by Odell Associates, Inc. and The Sheward Partnership. An American Airlines Admirals Club is located above the central food court area of Terminal F.

When Terminal F opened in 2001, it had 10,000 sq ft (929 m^{2}) of space for concessions.

=== Overseas Terminal (old international terminal) ===
The Overseas Terminal housed all the international airlines at Philadelphia. It was opened in 1973 and the building was a converted hangar. It was replaced by Terminal A in 1991.

== Ground transportation ==
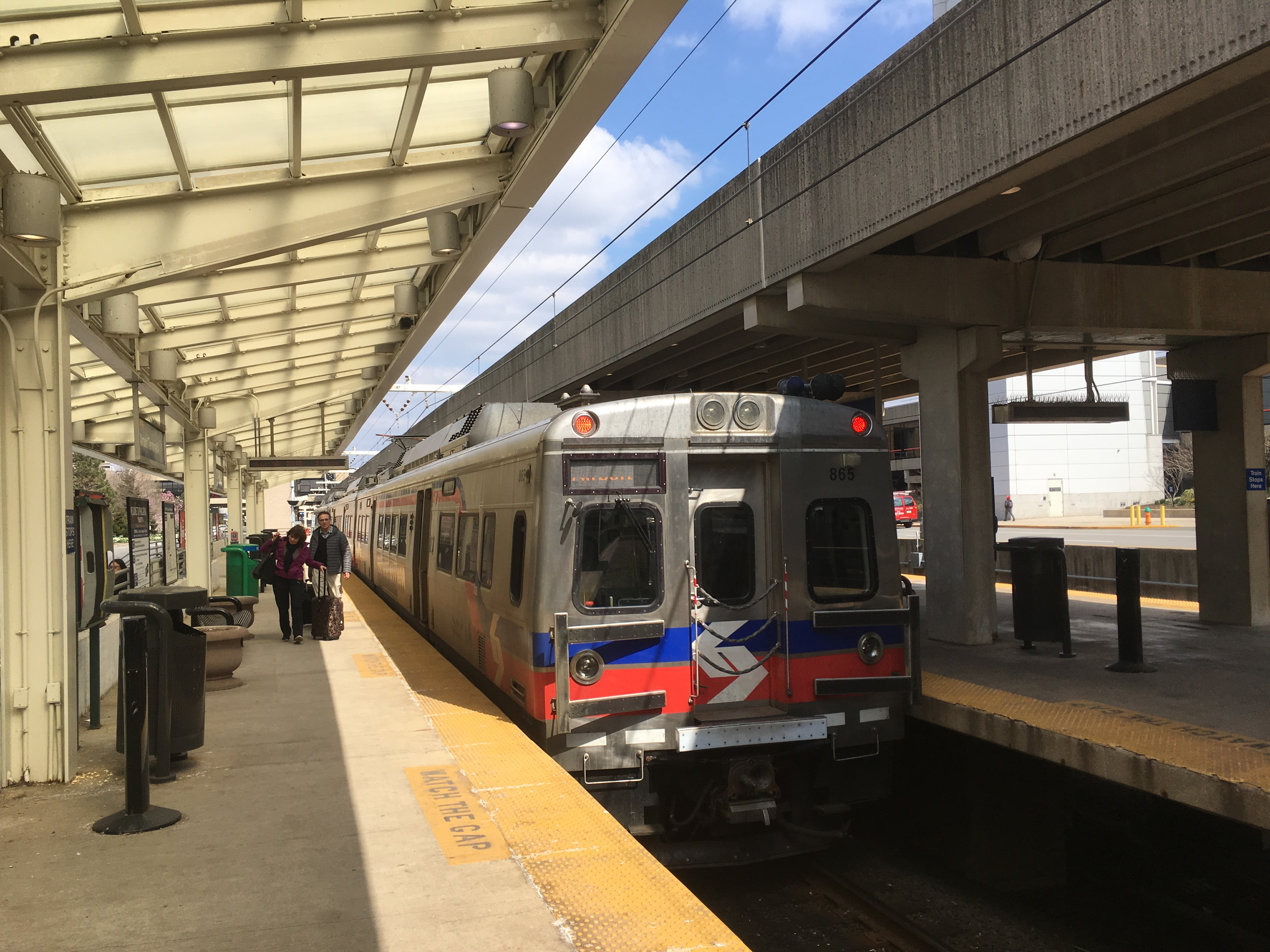
An outbound SEPTA Airport Line train at the Terminal A station, one of four SEPTA stops at the airport

SEPTA Regional Rail's Airport Line serves stations at Terminals A, B, C, D, and E. The four stations are Airport Terminal A East/West, Airport Terminal B, Airport Terminals C & D, and Airport Terminals E & F. The stations are next to the baggage claim at each terminal with escalator and elevator access from each terminal's skywalk. The Airport Line connects to Center City Philadelphia, other SEPTA trains, Amtrak trains, and NJ Transit trains at 30th Street Station. The Airport Line runs through Center City Philadelphia to Glenside, Pennsylvania; half of the trains continue to Warminster, Pennsylvania, on the Warminster Line while the other half of weekday trains diverge past Wayne Junction to continue to Fox Chase, Philadelphia, Pennsylvania, on the Fox Chase Line and the other half of weekend/holiday trains terminate at Glenside. The Airport Line runs 5:00 a.m. to midnight daily, with trains every 30 minutes on weekdays and every hour on weekends and holidays. The ride from the airport to Center City Philadelphia takes 25 minutes.

Philadelphia International Airport has road access from an interchange with I-95 (exit 12 northbound and exit 12A southbound), which heads north toward Center City Philadelphia and south into Delaware County. PA 291 heads northeast from the airport area and provides access to and from I-76. Rental cars are available through a number of companies; each operates a shuttle bus between its facility and the terminals. As part of the airport's expansion plan, the airport plans to construct a consolidated rental car facility. Taxis and ride-sharing services both serve the airport.

SEPTA has various bus routes to the airport: Route 37 (serving South Philadelphia and Chester Transit Center), Route 108 (serving 69th Street Transit Center and the UPS air hub), and Route 115 (serving Delaware County Community College and Darby Transportation Center). Local colleges and universities including The University of Pennsylvania, Villanova University, Swarthmore College, Haverford College and Saint Joseph's University traditionally operate transportation shuttles to the airport for students during heavy travel periods such as spring and Thanksgiving breaks.

=== Airline shuttle buses ===
Operator	Destinations	Refs
American Airlines (operated by Landline)	Allentown, Atlantic City, Trenton, Wilkes-Barre/Scranton, Wilmington (DE)	

American Airlines offers "tarmac-to-tarmac" bus service between PHL and several airports within close proximity, which are considered too close for flights to be economically feasible. This is designed to facilitate connections through PHL, a major international hub for American Airlines. Passengers check their bags and clear security at their respective airport, and board a motorcoach that takes them directly to a gate past security at PHL. The service is operated by the Landline Company, and is booked through the regular American Airlines reservation system.

== Airlines and destinations ==
Philadelphia International Airport is a major hub for American Airlines, which utilizes the airport as a transatlantic connecting point between Europe and the United States. Over 100 daily or weekly destinations are served by the following airlines to the following destinations:

=== Passenger ===
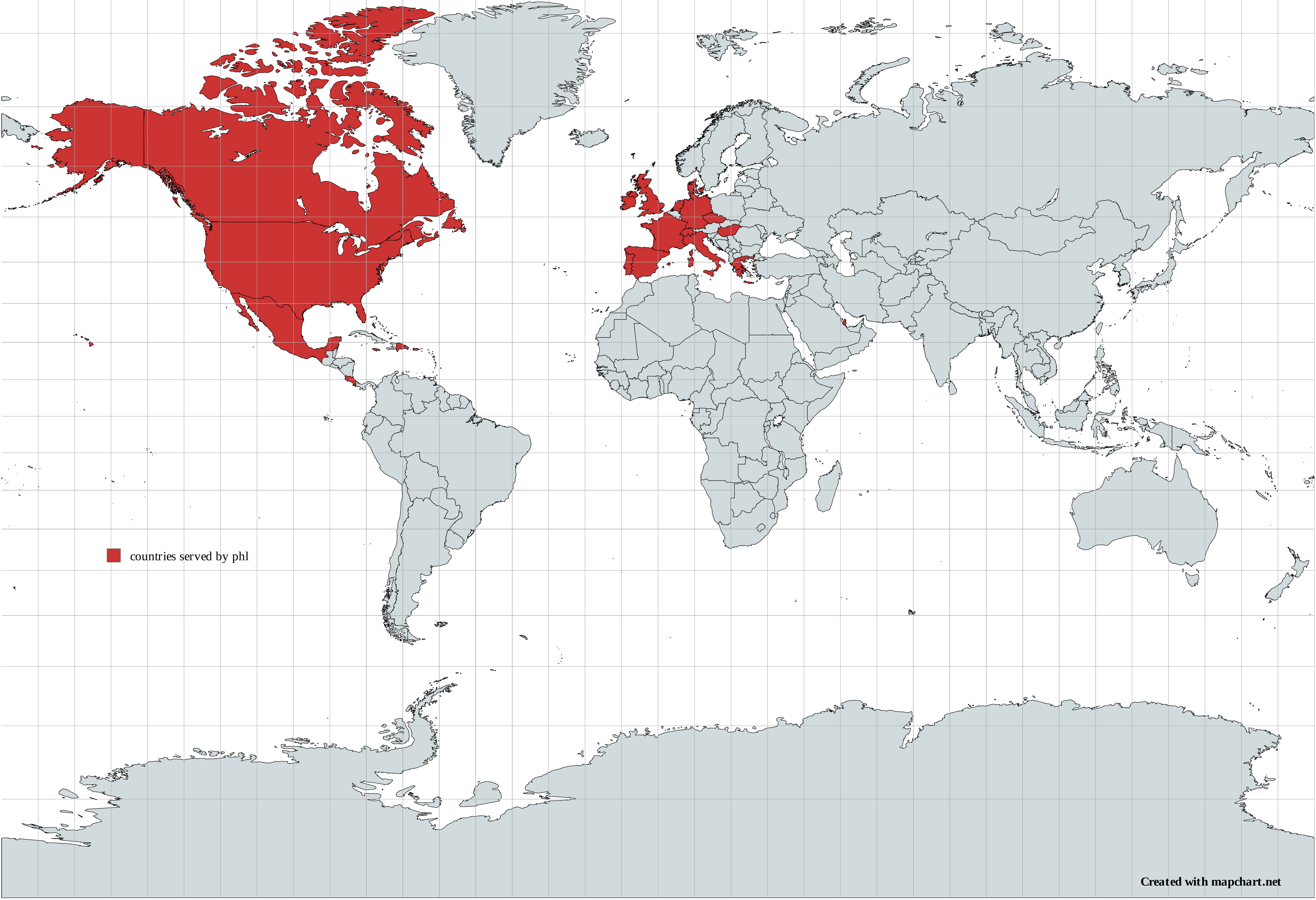
All countries served/will be served by PHL

Airlines	Destinations	Refs
Aer Lingus	Dublin	
Aeroméxico	Mexico City–Benito Juárez	
Air Canada	Seasonal: Montréal–Trudeau, Toronto–Pearson	
Air Canada Express	Montréal–Trudeau, Toronto–Pearson	
Alaska Airlines	Seattle/Tacoma; Seasonal: Portland (OR)	
Allegiant Air	Des Moines, Destin/Fort Walton Beach (begins May 21, 2027), Grand Rapids, Knoxville, St. Petersburg/Clearwater	
American Airlines	Amsterdam, Aruba, Atlanta, Austin, Barcelona, Boston, Cancún, Charleston (SC), Charlotte, Chicago–O'Hare, Dallas/Fort Worth, Denver, Dublin, Fort Lauderdale, Fort Myers, Hartford, Houston–Intercontinental, Jacksonville (FL), Kansas City, Key West, Las Vegas, Lisbon, London–Heathrow, Los Angeles, Madrid, Miami, Montego Bay, Nashville, Nassau, New Orleans, Orlando, Paris–Charles de Gaulle, Phoenix–Sky Harbor, Pittsburgh, Providenciales, Punta Cana, Raleigh/Durham, Rome–Fiumicino, St. Louis, St. Maarten, Salt Lake City, San Diego, San Francisco, San Juan, Sarasota, Seattle/Tacoma, Tampa, West Palm Beach, Zurich; Seasonal: Athens, Bangor, Barbados, Bermuda, Budapest, Burlington (VT), Cincinnati, Cleveland, Columbus–Glenn, Copenhagen, Edinburgh, Grand Cayman, Halifax, Indianapolis, Liberia (CR), Milan–Malpensa, Milwaukee, Minneapolis/St. Paul, Myrtle Beach, Naples, Nice, Pensacola, Portland (ME), Portland (OR), Porto (begins March 28, 2027), Prague, Providence, Reykjavík–Keflavík (begins May 27, 2027), St. Lucia–Hewanorra, St. Thomas, San Antonio, Santo Domingo–Las Américas, Santiago de los Caballeros, Savannah, Venice, Vienna (begins May 6, 2027)	
American Eagle	Albany, Asheville, Atlanta, Bangor, Birmingham (AL), Buffalo, Burlington (VT), Charleston (SC), Cincinnati, Cleveland, Columbia (SC), Columbus–Glenn, Dayton, Detroit, Fayetteville/Bentonville, Grand Rapids, Greensboro, Greenville/Spartanburg, Harrisburg, Hartford, Indianapolis, Jacksonville (FL), Kansas City, Knoxville, Lexington, Louisville, Madison, Manchester (NH), Memphis, Milwaukee, Minneapolis/St. Paul, Montréal–Trudeau, Myrtle Beach, Nashville, New Orleans, Norfolk, Pittsburgh, Portland (ME), Providence, Raleigh/Durham, Richmond, Roanoke, Rochester (NY), St. Louis, Salisbury, Savannah, State College, Syracuse, Toronto–Pearson, Washington–National, Watertown (NY), Wilmington (NC), Worcester; Seasonal: Boston, Des Moines, Destin/Fort Walton Beach, Hilton Head, Houston–Intercontinental, Hyannis, Key West, Martha's Vineyard, Nantucket, Omaha, Panama City (FL), Pensacola, Québec City, Sarasota, Traverse City, Vero Beach	
British Airways	London–Heathrow	
Delta Air Lines	Atlanta, Detroit, Los Angeles (begins June 7, 2027), Minneapolis/St. Paul, Salt Lake City; Seasonal: Seattle/Tacoma (ends November 30, 2026)	
Delta Connection	Boston, Detroit	
Discover Airlines	Frankfurt	
Frontier Airlines	Atlanta, Cancún, Charlotte, Chicago–O'Hare, Dallas/Fort Worth, Denver, Detroit, Fort Lauderdale, Fort Myers, Jacksonville (FL), Las Vegas, Miami, Nashville, Orlando, Punta Cana, Raleigh/Durham, San Juan, Tampa, West Palm Beach; Seasonal: Santiago de los Caballeros	
JetBlue	Boston, Fort Lauderdale, San Juan	
Qatar Airways	Doha	
Southwest Airlines	Baltimore (begins March 11, 2027), Chicago–Midway, Dallas–Love, Denver, Las Vegas (begins March 11, 2027), Nashville, Orlando, St. Louis; Seasonal: Tampa	
Sun Country Airlines	Seasonal: Minneapolis/St. Paul	
United Airlines	Chicago–O'Hare, Denver, Houston–Intercontinental, San Francisco	
United Express	Houston–Intercontinental, Washington–Dulles	

=== Cargo ===
Airlines	Destinations
UPS Airlines	Seasonal: Providence

== Statistics ==
=== Top destinations ===
Busiest domestic routes from PHL (September 2025 – August 2026)
Rank	City	Passengers	Carriers
1	Orlando, Florida	851,692	American, Frontier, Southwest, Spirit
2	Atlanta, Georgia	737,475	American, Delta, Frontier, Spirit
3	Chicago–O'Hare, Illinois	622,620	American, Frontier, United
4	Dallas/Fort Worth, Texas	532,202	American, Frontier
5	Fort Lauderdale, Florida	500,521	American, Frontier, JetBlue, Spirit
6	Boston, Massachusetts	490,780	American, Delta, JetBlue
7	Miami, Florida	480,105	American, Frontier, Spirit
8	Charlotte, North Carolina	456,295	American, Frontier, Spirit
9	Denver, Colorado	453,115	American, Frontier, Southwest, United
10	Tampa, Florida	392,556	American, Frontier, Southwest

Busiest international routes from PHL (September 2025 – August 2026)
Rank	Airport	Passengers	Carriers
1	London–Heathrow, United Kingdom	433,908	American, British Airways
2	Cancún, Mexico	329,069	American, Frontier, Spirit
3	Punta Cana, Dominican Republic	244,642	American, Frontier, Spirit
5	Toronto–Pearson, Canada	233,063	Air Canada, American
4	Dublin, Ireland	228,169	Aer Lingus, American
6	Rome–Fiumicino, Italy	176,826	American
7	Lisbon, Portugal	172,252	American
8	Madrid, Spain	145,462	American
9	Montréal–Trudeau, Canada	140,437	Air Canada, American
10	Barcelona, Spain	145,755	American

=== Airline market share ===
Largest airlines at PHL (September 2025 – August 2026)
Rank	Airline	Passengers	Share
1	American Airlines	19,987,739	67.5%
2	Frontier Airlines	3,281,227	11.1%
3	Delta Air Lines	1,837,071	6.2%
4	Southwest Airlines	1,407,497	4.7%
5	United Airlines	1,338,302	4.5%
6	Other	1,800,000	6.0%

=== Annual traffic ===
Annual passenger traffic at PHL, 2001 to present
Year	Passengers	Year	Passengers	Year	Passengers
2001	21,999,252	2011	30,359,304	2021	19,692,762
2002	22,575,198	2012	29,578,024	2022	24,967,598
2003	24,136,594	2013	29,885,717	2023	27,446,900
2004	28,154,670	2014	29,968,087	2024	30,332,985
2005	31,506,336	2015	30,508,133	2025	29,653,806
2006	31,492,896	2016	29,385,753	2026	20,307,128 (through August)
2007	31,851,176	2017	28,740,935	2027	
2008	31,663,951	2018	30,707,946	2028	
2009	30,547,467	2019	33,018,886	2029	
2010	30,445,551	2020	11,759,981	2030	

== Reception ==
A 2023 J.D. Power Satisfaction Study ranked Philadelphia International last out of a list of 28 "large" airports in the United States. This list is separate from a list of 21 "Mega" airports in the United States.

== Accidents and incidents ==
- On January 14, 1951, National Airlines Flight 83 crashed upon landing at Philadelphia from Newark International Airport. The aircraft skidded off the runway, crashed through a fence and came to rest in a ditch. During the incident, the left wing broke off, rupturing the gas tanks and setting the plane on fire. There were seven fatalities in all. Frankie Housley, the lone flight attendant on Flight 83, led ten passengers to safety but died trying to save an infant.
- On July 19, 1970, United Airlines Flight 611, a Boeing 737-222 on a domestic flight to Rochester, New York, experienced an engine failure in the #1 engine right after rotation. The captain decided to reject the takeoff and set the plane back on the runway. The plane touched down 1075 feet short of the runway end, continued across a blast pad, crossing a field, then passing through a 6-foot aluminum chain link fence into a field full of grass, brush and weeds. The 737 came to rest 1634 feet past the end of the runway. There were no fatalities and 18 passengers and one crew member sustained injuries among the 61 on board. The aircraft was damaged beyond economical repair. This was the first hull loss of a Boeing 737.
- On June 23, 1976, Allegheny Airlines Flight 121, a McDonnell Douglas DC-9, crash landed at PHL on final approach when encountering wind shear during a thunderstorm. There were 86 injuries out of the 4 crew and 102 passengers on board, but no fatalities. The aircraft was substantially damaged when it slid down the runway after touchdown, and was written off.
- On February 7, 2006, a UPS Airlines Douglas DC-8 cargo plane suffered an in-flight cargo fire and made an emergency landing at Philadelphia International Airport after filling with smoke. There were no injuries other than smoke inhalation affecting the crew, but the plane burned on the ground for hours into the night. Although most of the cargo survived, the aircraft was a total loss, with multiple holes burned through the roof skin. According to the NTSB, the firefighting crew did not have adequate training on using their skin-piercing extinguishing equipment and not knowing how to open the main cargo door, attempted to force the handle and broke the latch, rendering the door unopenable. There were also difficulties in obtaining the cargo manifest to determine what if any hazardous materials were on board, due to confusion about protocol. However, despite these failings, the airport staff, including the firefighting staff, managed the incident successfully without injury or major disruption of the airport. The NTSB suspected lithium-ion batteries were the source of ignition and made recommendations for more stringent rules and restrictions on their air transport, especially on passenger aircraft (unlike this one). For a cause of the incident, the NTSB focused on the delayed indication of fire by the required onboard fire detection system and criticized the standards to which such systems are tested, noting that the tests use an empty cargo hold and do not represent the real-world performance of the detection systems with the hold full of cargo, which significantly changes the flow patterns of hot air and smoke. The crew and air traffic control personnel were found to have behaved properly (with minor exceptions) and not to be at fault for the incident or its outcome.
- On March 13, 2014, US Airways Flight 1702, an Airbus A320-214, rotated then aborted takeoff and as a result suffered a tailstrike and a nose landing gear collapse. The aircraft then continued down runway 27L coming to a stop off to the left of the runway. None of the 149 passengers and 5 crew members suffered life-threatening injuries. However, the aircraft saw substantial damage and was later written off.
- On April 17, 2018, Southwest Airlines Flight 1380, a Boeing 737-700 en route from New York to Dallas, suffered an engine failure on its left engine. Debris from the engine struck the aircraft's fuselage and a side window. The window shattered, causing a rapid depressurization of the aircraft. The pilots decided to divert to land at Philadelphia International Airport. One passenger died after being partially ejected from the shattered window. Eight others were injured and treated locally at the airport.

== See also ==
- 30th Street Station
- Hog Island
- Northeast Philadelphia Airport
- Pennsylvania World War II Army Airfields
- Philadelphia TRACON
