= Flight 34 =

Flight 34 may refer to:

- United Air Lines Flight 34, crashed on 27 December 1936
- Western Air Lines Flight 34, crashed on 26 February 1954
- Dan-Air Flight 0034, crashed on 31 July 1979
