= Boeing 247 =

Airliner family by Boeing

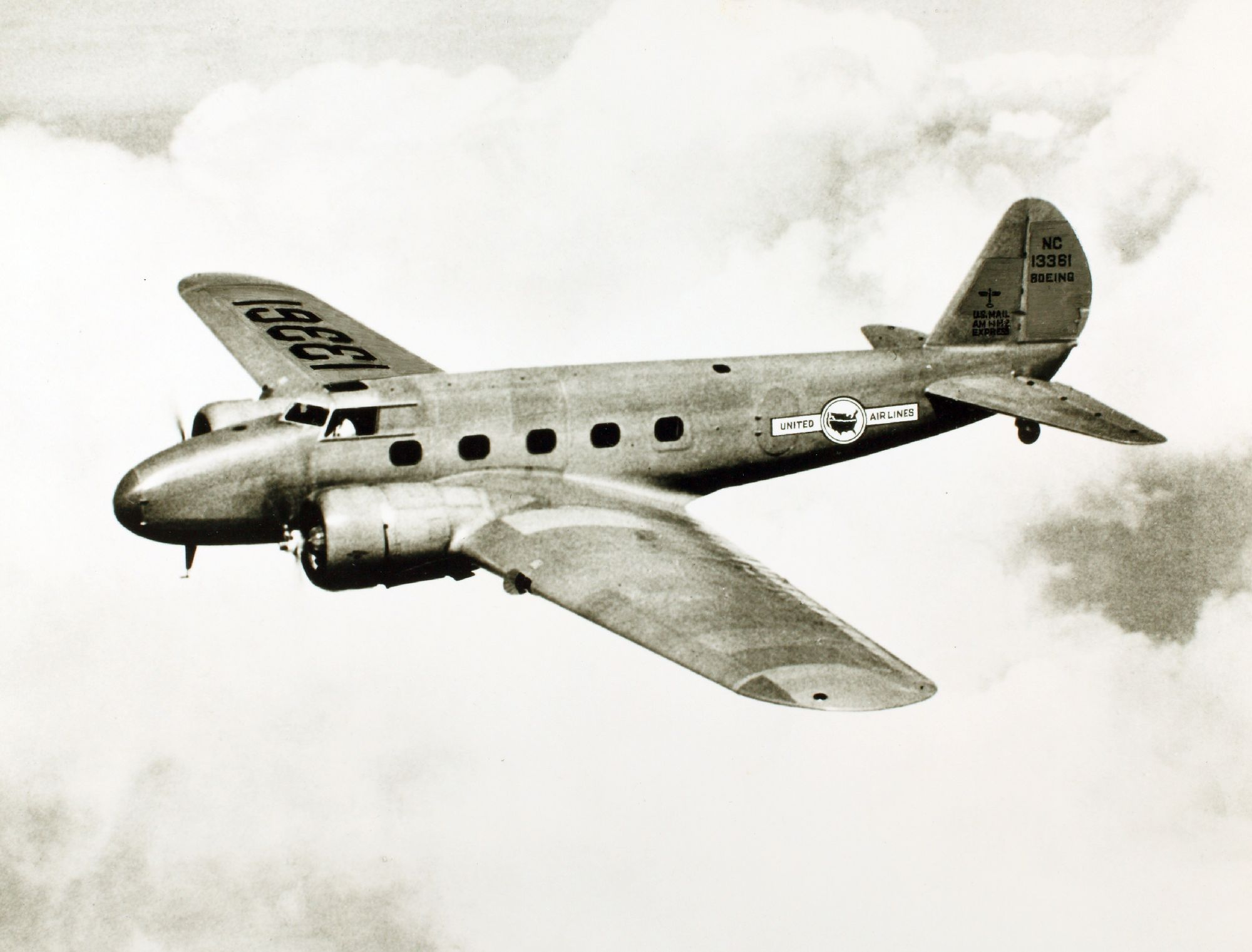
- United Air Lines Boeing 247D in flight

General information
- Type: Passenger airliner
- National origin: United States
- Manufacturer: Boeing
- Status: Retired
- Primary user: Boeing Air Transport
- Number built: 75

History
- Introduction date: May 22, 1933
- First flight: February 8, 1933

The Boeing Model 247 is an early American airliner, and one of the first such aircraft to incorporate advances such as all-metal (anodized aluminum) semimonocoque construction, a fully cantilevered wing, and retractable landing gear. Other advanced features included control surface trim tabs, an autopilot and de-icing boots for the wings and tailplane. The 247 first flew on February 8, 1933, and entered service later that year.

== Design and development ==
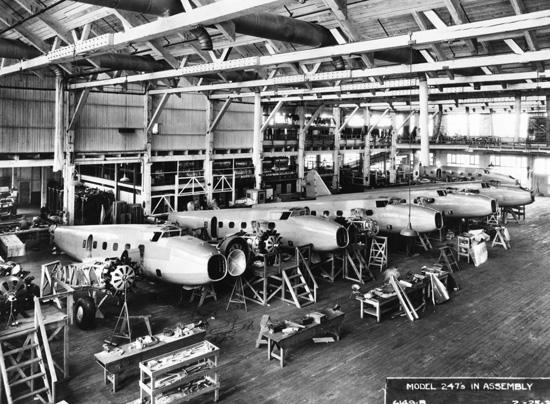
The Boeing 247 production line

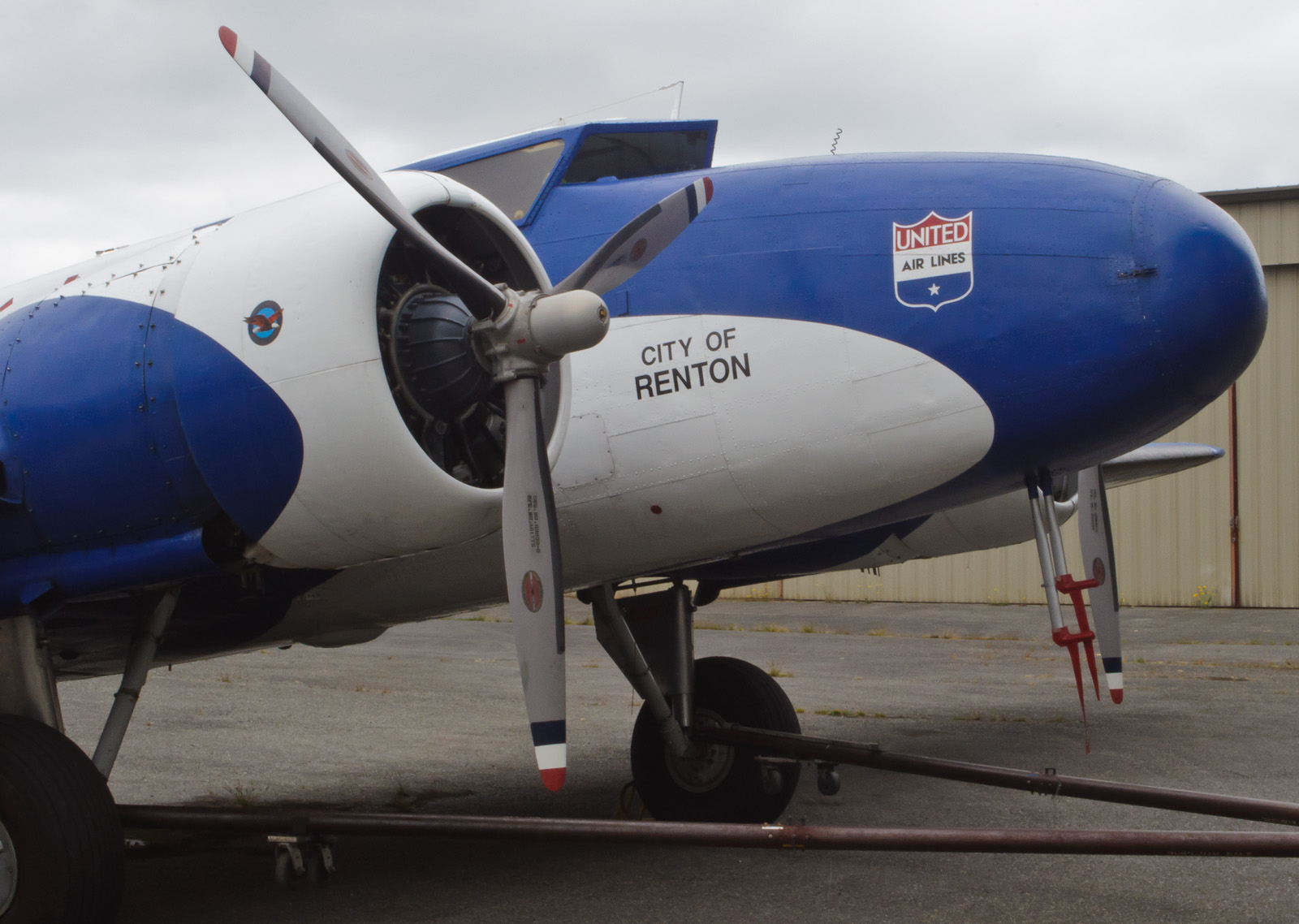
Early versions had the windshield raked forward, to avoid reflecting light off the cockpit instruments. It was later changed to a backward slope because it reflected landing lights on the ground.

Boeing introduced a host of aerodynamic and technical features into a new commercial airliner building on work with the earlier Monomail (Models 200, 221, 221A) mailplanes and B-9 bomber designs. The Boeing 247 was faster than the best U.S. fighter of its day, the open-cockpit biplane Boeing P-12. The low landing speed of 62 mph (100 km/h) avoided the need for flaps, and pilots learned that at speeds as low as 10 mph (16 km/h), the 247 could be taxied "tail high" for ease of ground handling.

The 247 could fly on one engine. With controllable-pitch propellers, the 247 could maintain 11,500 ft (3,500 m) at maximum gross weight on one engine. Aside from its size, much lower wing loading, and the wing spar obstructing the cabin, many of its features became the norm for airliners, including the Douglas DC-1, before World War II. Originally planned as a 14-passenger airliner powered by Pratt & Whitney R-1690 Hornet radial engines, the preliminary review of the design concept by United Air Lines' pilots had resulted in a redesign to a smaller, less capable configuration, powered by R-1340 Wasp engines.

One concern of the pilots was that in their view, few airfields could safely take an eight-ton aircraft. They also objected to the Hornet engines, which had a detonation problem when using the available low octane fuel, and suffered from excessive vibration. Pratt & Whitney's chief engineer, George Mead, knew the problem would be resolved eventually, but P&W's president, Frederick Rentschler acquiesced to the airline pilots' demand. The decision created a rift between Mead and Rentschler. Despite the disagreements, the 247 would be Boeing's showcase exhibit at the 1933 Chicago World's Fair.

The slope of the early 247's windshield was reversed from normal. This was a design solution, also used on other contemporary aircraft, to the problem of control panel instrument lights reflecting off the windshield, but the reversed windshield reflected ground lights instead, especially during landings, and it also increased drag. By the introduction of the 247D, the windshield was sloped normally, and the glare was resolved with a glarescreen extension over the panel.

Boeing incorporated design elements to enhance passenger comfort, such as the thermostat controlled, air conditioned, and noise-proofed cabin. The crew included a pilot and copilot, as well as a flight attendant (then known as a "steward"), who could tend to passenger needs. The main landing gear did not fully retract; the wheels extended slightly below the nacelles, typical of designs of the time, as a means of reducing structural damage in a wheels-up landing. The tailwheel was not retractable. While the Model 247 and 247A had speed-ring engine cowlings and fixed-pitch propellers, the Model 247D incorporated NACA cowlings and variable-pitch propellers.

== Operational history ==
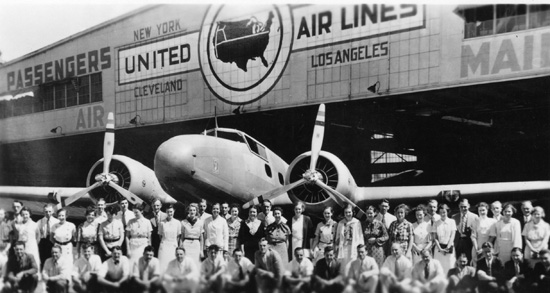
United Airlines crew members and employees stand in front of a Boeing 247.

A Boeing 247D in its MacRobertson Air Race markings, c. 1934. Note the dramatic pose in this fanciful 1935 illustrated card art.

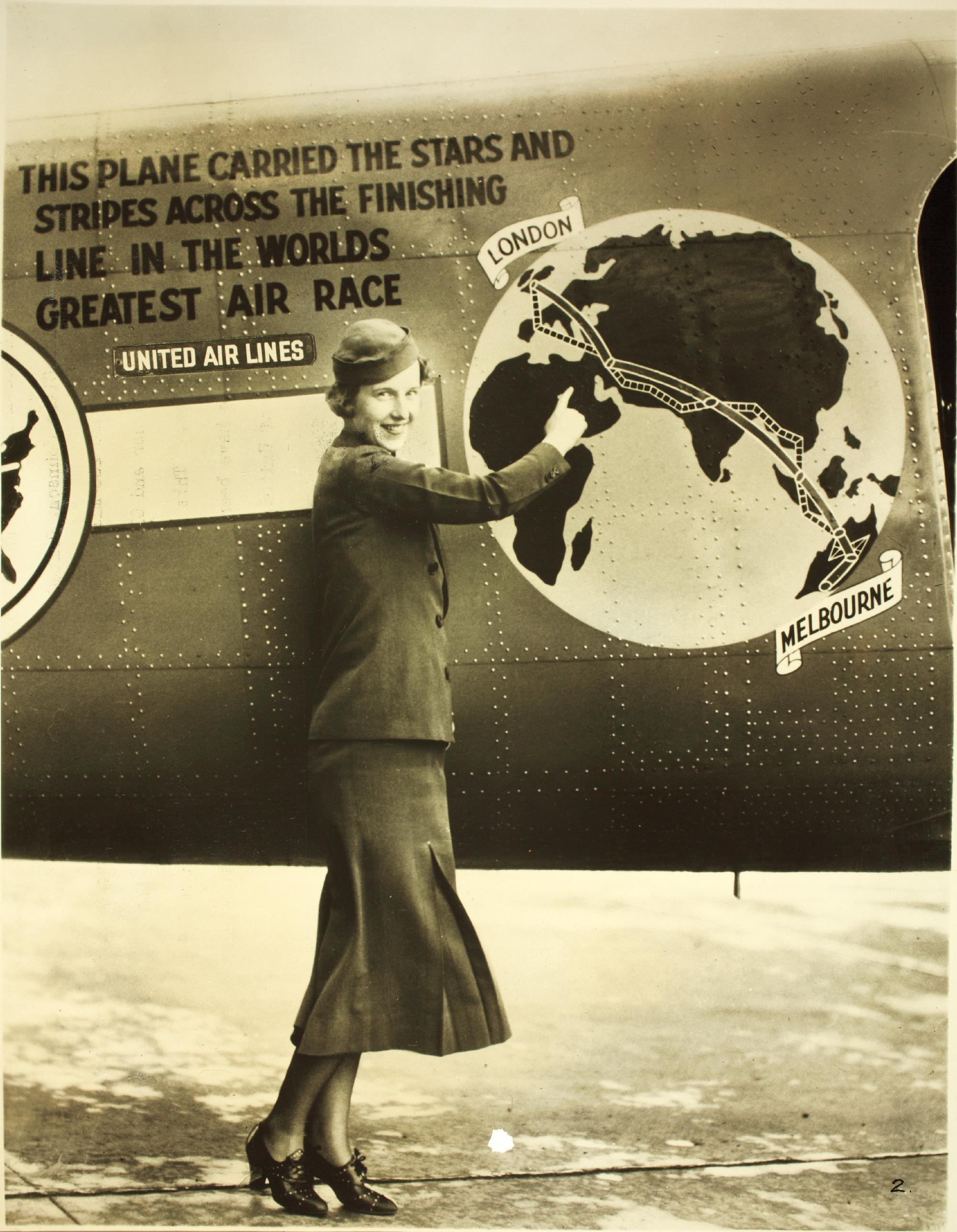
A stewardess points to the markings on a Boeing 247 that commemorate finishing third in the MacRobertson Air Race.

As the 247 emerged from its test and development phase, the company further showcased its capabilities by entering a long-distance air race in 1934, the MacRobertson Air Race from England to Australia. During the 1930s, aircraft designs were often proven in air races and other aerial contests. A modified 247D was entered, flown by Colonel Roscoe Turner and Clyde Pangborn. The 247, race number "57", was essentially a production model, but all airliner furnishings were removed to accommodate eight additional fuselage fuel tanks. The MacRobertson Air Race attracted aircraft entries from all over the globe, including both prototypes and established production types, with the grueling course considered an excellent proving ground, as well as an opportunity to gain worldwide attention. Turner and Pangborn came in second place in the transport section (and third overall), behind the Boeing 247's eventual rival, the new Douglas DC-2.

Being the winner of the 1934 U.S. Collier Trophy for excellence in aviation design, the first 247 production orders were earmarked for William Boeing's airline, Boeing Air Transport. The 247 was capable of crossing the United States from east to west eight hours faster than its predecessors, such as the Ford Trimotor and Curtiss Condor. Entering service on May 22, 1933, a Boeing Air Transport 247 set a cross-country record of 19 1/2 hours on its San Francisco to New York City inaugural flight.

Boeing sold the first 60 247s, an unprecedented $3.5 million order, to its affiliated airline, Boeing Air Transport (part of the United Aircraft and Transport Corporation, UATC), at a unit price of $65,000. TWA (Transcontinental & Western Air) also ordered the 247, but UATC declined the order, which resulted in TWA President Jack Frye setting out requirements for a new airliner and funding Don Douglas to design and build the Douglas DC-1 prototype. Douglas eventually developed the design into the DC-2 and DC-3.

The Boeing design had been the first to enter series production, but the 247 proved to have some serious deficiencies. Airlines considered its limited capacity a drawback, since it carried only 10 passengers, in five rows with a seat on each side of the aisle, as well as a stewardess. Compared to the more spacious DC-2 and later DC-3, the passenger count was too few to make it a commercially viable airliner. Another feature influencing passenger comfort was that the 247's main wing spar ran through the cabin, so persons moving through the cabin had to step over it. The Lockheed Model 10 Electra had a similar configuration, and while it was a more compact design, the Electra managed to carry the same number of passengers at a slightly better overall performance, and at a lower cost-per-mile.

Seventy-five 247s were built; Douglas collected 800 civil orders for DC-3s before the Pearl Harbor attack, and produced over 10,000 DC-3s, including wartime production of C-47s, while the rival Lockheed Electra "family" was eventually to reach over 3,000 in its various civil and military variants. Boeing Air Transport bought 60 examples, United Aircraft Corp. 10, Lufthansa ordered three, but only two were delivered, and one went to a private owner in China. While the industry primarily standardized on Boeing's competitors, many of United's aircraft were later purchased by Western Air Express at "bargain-basement prices".

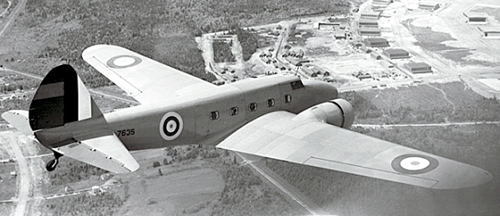
No. 121 RCAF Squadron Boeing 247D, c. 1939

The 247 remained in airline service until World War II, when several were converted into C-73 transports and trainers. The Royal Canadian Air Force's 121 Squadron operated seven 247Ds as medium transports during the early part of the war. One of these aircraft was donated to the Royal Air Force (RAF) for radar testing, where it was renumbered DZ203. DZ203 was passed among several units in the RAF before being used to make the world's first fully automatic blind landing on 16 January 1945.

Warlord "Young Marshal" Zhang Xueliang ordered two Boeing 247Ds for his air force. He used one of them, named Bai-Ying (White Eagle), during the Xi'an incident in 1936, during which he flew into the opposing Nationalist army's camp at Sian (now rendered as Xi'an) under a secret truce, and had their leader, Generalissimo Chiang Kai-shek, arrested, ending the civil war between the Communist and Nationalist armies, so they could fight together against the Japanese invaders.

A number of specially modified variants included a Boeing 247Y appropriated from United for Air Corps use as a test aircraft fitted with two machine guns in the nose. The same installation later was fitted to a 247Y owned by Generalissimo Chiang Kai-shek. This aircraft also featured a Colt .50 in (12.7 mm) machine gun in a flexible mount. A 247D purchased by the British RAF became a testbed for instrument approach equipment and received a nonstandard nose, new powerplants, and fixed landing gear. Some 247s were still flying in the late 1960s as cargo transports and business aircraft.

The Turner/Pangborn 247D still exists. Originally flown on September 5, 1934, it was leased from United Airlines for the 1934 MacRobertson Air Race and returned to United, where it served in regular airline service until 1937. Subsequently, the 247D was sold to the Union Electric Company of St. Louis for use as an executive transport. The Air Safety Board purchased the aircraft in 1939 and it remained in use for 14 years before it was donated to the National Air and Space Museum, Washington, DC. It is displayed today with two sets of markings, the left side is marked as NR257Y, in Colonel Turner's 1934 MacRobertson Air Race colors, while the right side is painted in United Airlines livery, as NC13369.

== Variants ==
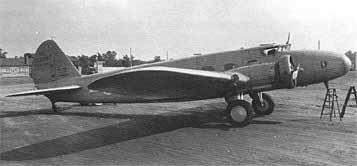
Boeing 247 prototype at Boeing Field, c. 1933

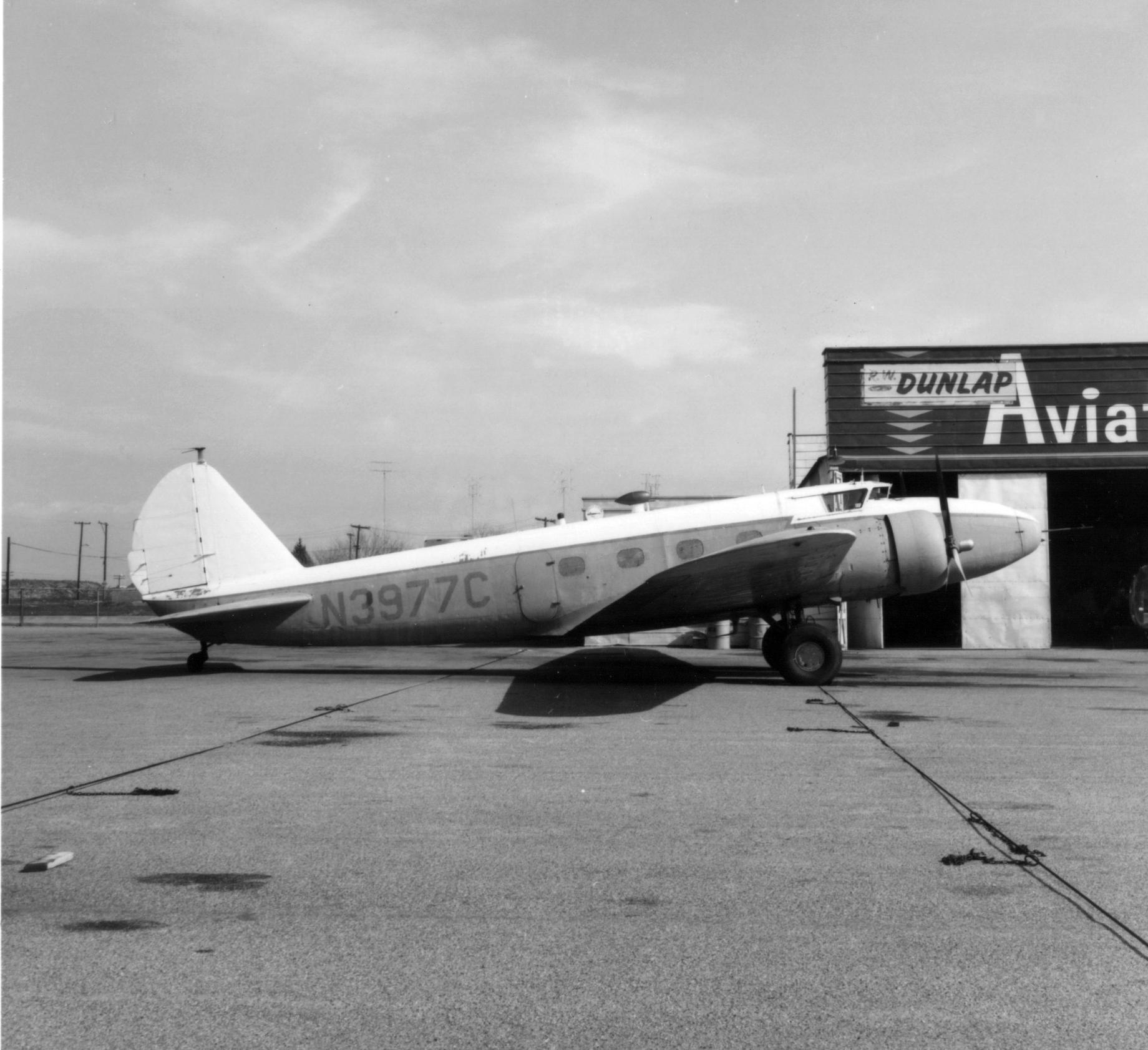
A 247 in the 1950s

Model 247
Twin-engined civil transport airliner, initial production version
247A
Powered by new 625 hp (466 kW) P&W Wasp, on special order for Deutsche Luft Hansa in 1934
247E
This designation was given to the first Boeing 247 aircraft, it was used to test a number improvements that were later incorporated into the Boeing 247D.
247D
Original one-off was a race aircraft designed for the MacRobertson Air Race; use of Hamilton Standard variable-pitch propellers allowed for a 7 mph (11 km/h) gain; the 247D configuration incorporated in production series bearing the same name.
247Y
Armed version, one exported to China, second used for trials
C-73
Designation for Boeing 247D airliners impressed into military service in USAAF, 27 in total
Model 280
Proposed development of Boeing 247 with 14 seats and 700 hp (520 kW) P&W Hornet engines

== Operators ==
=== Civil operators ===
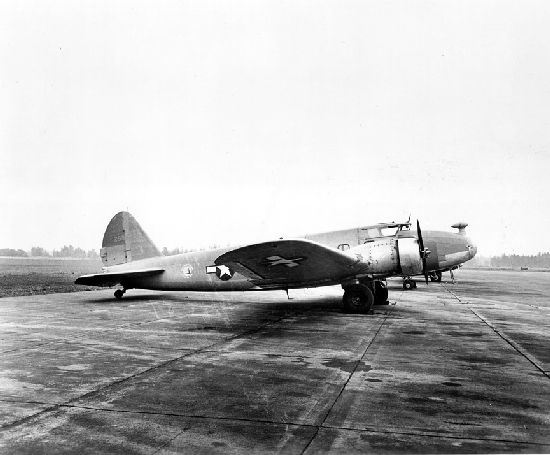
A C-73 during World War II

Brazil

- Viação Aérea Bahiana operated one aircraft.

Canada

- Canadian Pacific Airlines
- Quebec Airways

Republic of China

- Private owner operated one aircraft.

Colombia

- Avianca as SCADTA operated 10 aircraft.

Nazi Germany

- Lufthansa operated one aircraft and used a second for spares/testing.

United States

- Boeing Air Transport (later United Air Lines) operated 60 aircraft.
- Empire Air Lines
- National Parks Airways
- Pennsylvania Central Airlines
- United Aircraft Corporation operated 10 aircraft.
- Wien Air Alaska
- Western Air Express, the predecessor of Western Airlines, received some of ex-United Aircraft Corporation aircraft.
- Woodley Airways
- Wyoming Air Service

=== Military operators ===
Canada

- Royal Canadian Air Force

United Kingdom

- Royal Air Force

United States

- United States Army Air Corps

== Accidents and incidents ==
October 10, 1933
United Air Lines 247, NC13304 (c/n 1685) United Air Lines Flight 23, was probably the first victim of sabotage of a commercial airliner. The aircraft, en route from Cleveland to Chicago, was destroyed by a nitroglycerin-based explosive device over Chesterton, Indiana. All seven on board were killed.
November 9, 1933
A Pacific Air Transport 247, NC13345 (c/n 1727), crashed on takeoff after the pilot became disoriented in fog and low visibility; four of ten on board died.
November 24, 1933
A National Air Transport 247, NC13324 (c/n 1705), was being ferried from Chicago to Kansas City when it crashed near Wedron, Illinois, killing all three crew.
February 23, 1934
A United Air Lines 247, NC13357 (c/n 1739), crashed in Parley's Canyon in fog near Salt Lake City, killing all eight on board.
December 20, 1934
United Air Lines Flight 6, a 247 (NC13328, c/n 1709), struck a tree and crashed near Western Springs, Illinois, due to carburetor icing; all four on board survived. The aircraft involved was repaired and converted to 247D standard in July 1935 and returned to service; the aircraft was pressed into USAAF service in 1942 and redesignated as C-73 with tail number 42-57210. The aircraft was damaged in a wind storm at Duncan Field, Texas, on August 30, 1942, and was written off.
March 24, 1935
The sole 247 operated by Lufthansa (D-AGAR, c/n 1945) was damaged beyond economical repair in a collision with an Air France aircraft on the ground at Nuremberg and then scrapped
September 1, 1935
Western Air Express 247, NC13314 (c/n 1695), was being ferried from Burbank, California, to Saugus, California, when it struck high tension power lines after takeoff, killing all three on board.
October 7, 1935
United Airlines Flight 4, a 247D (c/n 1698), went down about 10 mi (16 km) west of Cheyenne, Wyoming due to pilot error. Three crew and nine passengers killed, there were no survivors.
October 30, 1935
United Air Lines Boeing 247D, NC13323 (c/n 1704), crashed during an instrument checkflight near Cheyenne, killing the four crew members aboard.
December 15, 1936
Seven died when Western Air Express Flight 6, a 247D, en route from Burbank, California, to Salt Lake City via Las Vegas, crashed just below Hardy Ridge on Lone Peak in Utah. The major parts of the aircraft were hurled over the ridge and fell over 1,000 ft (300 m) into a basin below.
December 27, 1936
United Airlines Trip 34, a 247D (c/n 1737), crashed at the head of Rice Canyon, Los Angeles County, California, due to pilot error; all 12 on board died.
January 12, 1937
Western Air Express Flight 7, a 247D (c/n 1696) flight from Salt Lake City to Burbank, crashed into a mountain near Newhall, California, killing five. Among the dead was Martin Johnson of Martin and Osa Johnson fame (adventurers, authors, and documentary filmmakers).
August 13, 1937
A 247 being operated by the Luftwaffe's proving ground at Rechlin (formerly D-AKIN of Lufthansa, c/n 1944) crashed at Hannover, Germany, during a test flight, killing seven of eight on board. The aircraft was being used as a testbed for an experimental autopilot.
March 13, 1939
A SCADTA 247D, C-149, crashed near Manzanares, Caldas, Colombia, killing all eight on board.
February 27, 1940
A SCADTA 247D, C-140, struck El Mortino mountain near Tona, Santander, Colombia, killing all 11 on board.
July 30, 1942
A Northwest Airlines C-73, 42-68639 (c/n 1717, former NC13335), crashed and burned on takeoff from Wold Chamberlain Field, near Minneapolis, Minnesota, killing all 10 on board.
October 24, 1942
A SCADTA 247D, C-144, named "Rodrigo de Bastidas" crashed into mountain, Caldas, Colombia, killing all six on board.

== Surviving aircraft ==
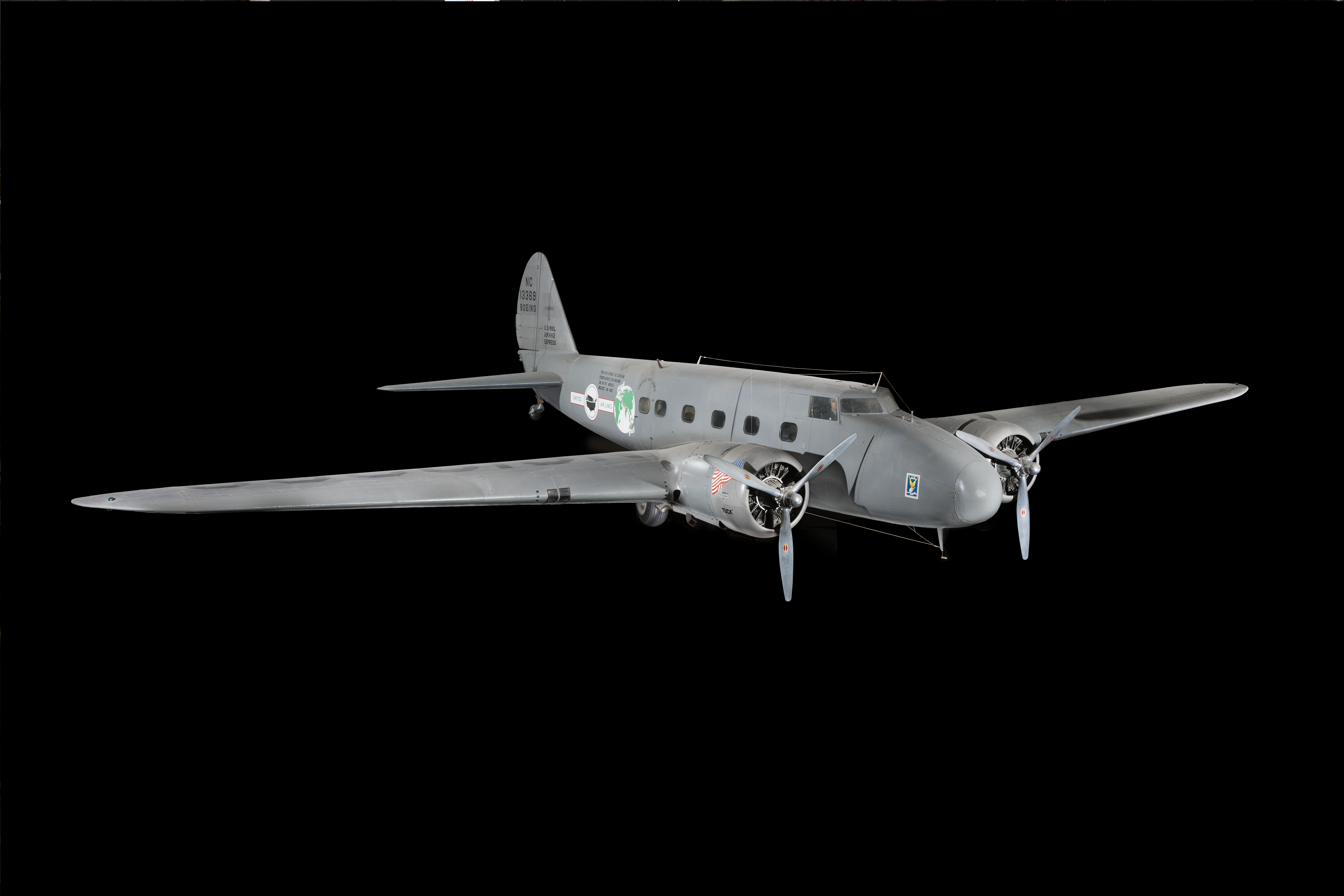
Boeing 247D at the National Air and Space Museum showing United Air Lines markings in this view.

c/n 1699, CF-JRQ
Exhibited in Canada Aviation and Space Museum, Ottawa. Donated to the museum in 1967 by California Standard Oil of Calgary, Alberta.

c/n 1722, N18E
Exhibited in the National Museum of Science and Industry, Wroughton, UK

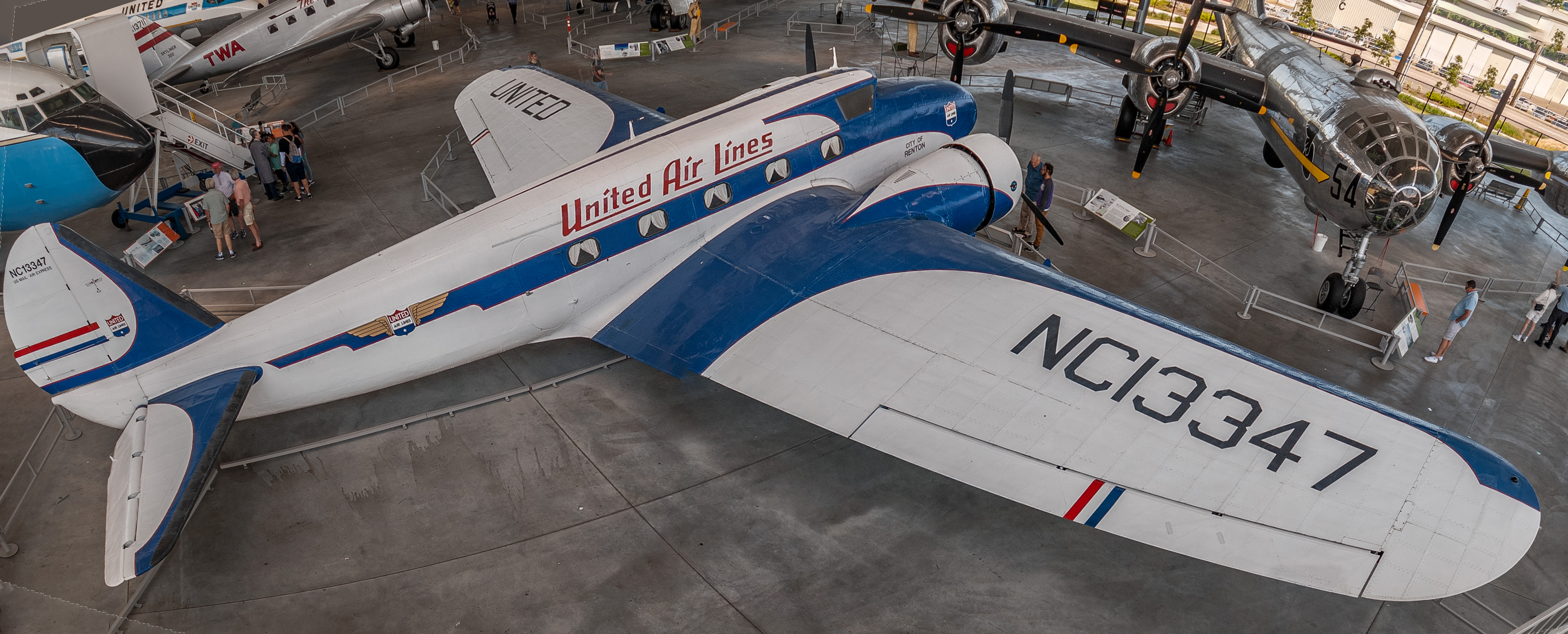
The Boeing 247 at the Museum of Flight in the city of Tukwila, just south of Seattle

c/n 1729, N13347
Static display, flown after restoration at the Museum of Flight Restoration Center, Paine Field, Snohomish County, Washington, USA, to the Museum of Flight main facility on 26 April 2016 where it was subsequently installed in that museum's Air Park.

c/n 1953, NC13369 / NR257Y
Exhibited in the Hall of Air Transportation at the National Air and Space Museum, Washington, D.C., USA, with United Air Lines colors and registration as NC13369 on its right fuselage and wing and as NR257Y with MacRobertson Air Race markings on its left side.

== Specifications (Boeing 247D) ==

Data from Boeing aircraft since 1916

General characteristics

- Crew: Three
- Capacity: 10 passengers + baggage and 400 lb (181 kg) of mail
- Length: 51 ft 7 in (15.72 m)
- Wingspan: 74 ft 1 in (22.58 m)
- Height: 12 ft 1.75 in (3.7021 m)
- Wing area: 836.13 sq ft (77.679 m^{2})
- Airfoil: Boeing 106B
- Empty weight: 8,921 lb (4,046 kg)
- Max takeoff weight: 13,650 lb (6,192 kg)
- Fuel capacity: 273 US gal (227 imp gal; 1,030 L)
- Powerplant: 2 × Pratt & Whitney R-1340 S1H1-G Wasp 9-cylinder air-cooled radial piston engines, 500 hp (370 kW) each at 2,200 rpm at 8,000 ft (2,400 m)
- Propellers: 2-bladed variable-pitch propellers (3-bladed propellers shown in line drawing)

Performance

- Maximum speed: 200 mph (320 km/h, 170 kn)
- Cruise speed: 189 mph (304 km/h, 164 kn) at 12,000 ft (3,700 m)
- Range: 745 mi (1,199 km, 647 nmi)
- Service ceiling: 25,400 ft (7,700 m)
- Absolute ceiling: 27,200 ft (8,291 m)
- Rate of climb: 1,150 ft/min (5.8 m/s)

== See also ==
Related development

- Boeing 307 Stratoliner

Aircraft of comparable role, configuration, and era

- Douglas DC-2
- Douglas DC-3
- Junkers Ju 52
- Lockheed Model 10 Electra
- Lockheed Model 14 Super Electra
- ANT-35/PS-35

Related lists

- List of aircraft of World War II

== Bibliography ==
- Boughton, Trevor W. (April–July 1980). "Talkback". Air Enthusiast. No. 12. p. 49. ISSN 0143-5450.
- Bowers, Peter M. Boeing aircraft since 1916. London: Putnam Aeronautical Books, 1989. ISBN 0-85177-804-6.
- Bryan, C.D.B. The National Air and Space Museum. New York: Harry N. Abrams, Inc., 1979. ISBN 0-8109-0666-X.
- Denham, Terry. World directory of airliner crashes, Patrick Stephens Ltd., Sparkford, 1996. ISBN 1-85260-554-5.
- Fernandez, Ronald. Excess Profits: The Rise of United Technologies. Boston, Massachusetts: Addison-Wesley, 1983. ISBN 978-0-201-10484-4.
- Gould, William. Boeing (Business in Action). Bath, Avon, UK: Cherrytree Books, 1995. ISBN 0-7451-5178-7.
- Mondey, David, The Concise Guide to American Aircraft of World War II. London: Chancellor, 1996. ISBN 1-85152-706-0.
- Pearcy, Arthur. Douglas Propliners: DC-1–DC-7. Shrewsbury, UK: Airlife Publishing, 1995. ISBN 1-85310-261-X.
- Pedigree of Champions: Boeing Since 1916, Third Edition. Seattle, Washington: The Boeing Company, 1969. No ISBN. WorldCat.
- Seely, Victor. "Boeing's Grand Old Lady." Air Classics, Vol. 4, No. 6, August 1968.
- Serling, Robert J. Legend & Legacy: The Story of Boeing and its People. New York: St. Martin's Press, 1992. ISBN 0-312-05890-X.
- Taylor, H. A. "Boeing's Trend-Setting 247". Air Enthusiast, No. 9, February–May 1979, pp. 43–54. ISSN 0143-5450.
- Taylor, H. A. "Talkback". Air Enthusiast, No. 10, July–September 1979, p. 80. ISSN 0143-5450
- van der Linden, F. Robert. The Boeing 247: The First Modern Airliner. Seattle, Washington: University of Washington Press, 1991. ISBN 0-295-97094-4. Retrieved: July 26, 2009.
- Yenne, Bill. Boeing: Planemaker to the World. New York:, Crescent Books, 1989. ISBN 0-517-69244-9.
