= Western Air Lines Flight 34 =

1954 aviation accident in Wyoming

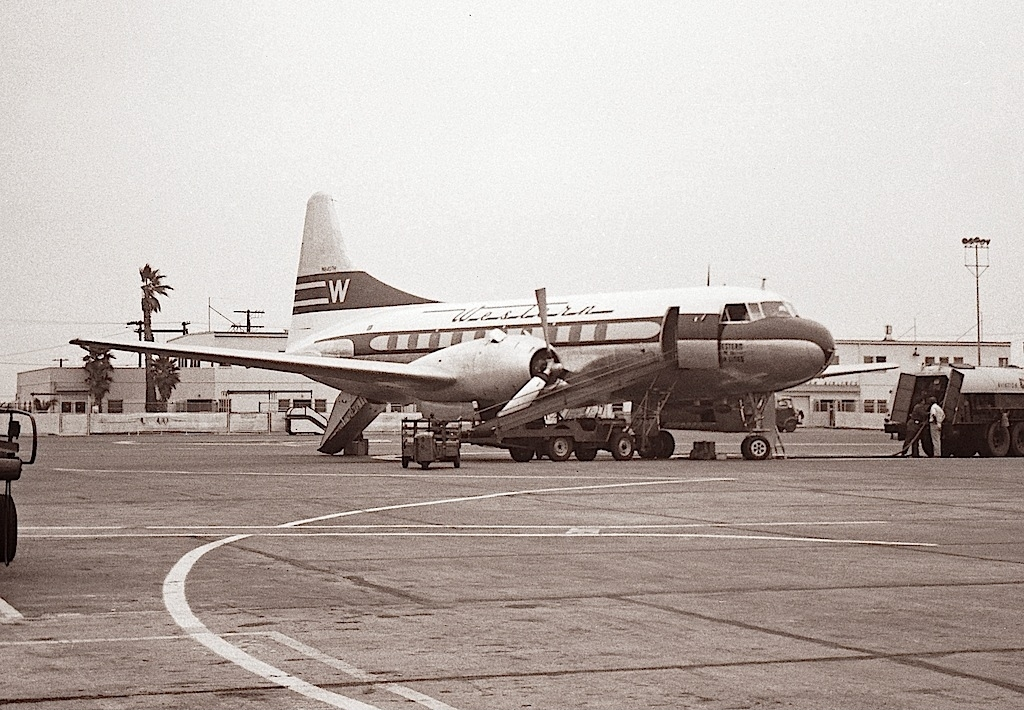
- N8407H, the aircraft involved, pictured in 1950

Accident
- Date: February 26, 1954
- Summary: Crashed during bad weather
- Site: Near Wright, Wyoming, US; 43.8050°N 105.0975°W

Aircraft
- Aircraft type: Convair CV-240-1
- Operator: Western Air Lines
- Registration: N8407H
- Flight origin: Los Angeles International Airport in Los Angeles
- 1st stopover: McCarran Field in Las Vegas
- 2nd stopover: Cedar City Regional Airport in Cedar City, Utah
- 3rd stopover: Salt Lake City Municipal Airport in Salt Lake City
- 4th stopover: Natrona County Municipal Airport in Casper, Wyoming
- 5th stopover: Rapid City Regional Airport in Rapid City, South Dakota
- Destination: Minneapolis–Saint Paul International Airport, Minneapolis
- Occupants: 9
- Passengers: 6
- Crew: 3
- Fatalities: 9
- Survivors: 0

Western Air Lines Flight 34 was a scheduled flight between Los Angeles International Airport in Los Angeles and Minneapolis–Saint Paul International Airport in Minneapolis, Minnesota, United States. On February 26, 1954, the Convair CV-240 conducting the flight crashed while flying through storms over Wyoming, killing all nine occupants of the plane. Severe blizzards accompanied by extreme winds were present in the region, and it took searchers three days to find the crash site. The aircraft crashed into the frozen ground at high speed, leaving an impact crater and widespread fragmentation of the wreckage. Crash investigators conducted an investigation of the events that led up to the crash, but were unable to find a clear cause. The final accident report identified the probable cause as "a sudden emergency of undetermined origin under adverse weather conditions resulting in rapid descent and impact with the ground at high speed".

== Background ==
Flight 34 was a regularly scheduled flight between Los Angeles International Airport in Los Angeles and Minneapolis–Saint Paul International Airport in Minneapolis with intermediate stops at McCarran Field in Las Vegas; Cedar City Regional Airport in Cedar City, Utah; Salt Lake City Municipal Airport in Salt Lake City; Natrona County Municipal Airport in Casper, Wyoming; and Rapid City Regional Airport in Rapid City, South Dakota.

On the morning of February 26, 1954, the flight segments between Los Angeles and Salt Lake City were uneventful. The flight was scheduled to depart Salt Lake City at 7:15 a.m. Mountain Standard Time for the flight to Casper. The aircraft was refueled with 1,000 US gallons (3,800 L) of fuel, and the crew was replaced by a relief crew consisting of two pilots and one flight attendant. No passengers boarded or left the aircraft in Salt Lake City. After leaving the terminal, the aircraft returned a few minutes later and the crew reported that it had a broken nose wheel steering cable, the repair of which caused a 90-minute delay. The flight eventually left at 8:50 a.m., with six passengers and 900 pounds (410 kg) of cargo. The cargo was strapped to the plane's six front seats using the seat belts, then it was covered with blankets and secured with ropes to the bases of the seats.

Before leaving, the crew of the flight received a briefing on the weather conditions between Salt Lake City and Minneapolis, which included surface weather observations, forecasts, and upper air reports. The forecasts for central and eastern Wyoming showed mostly overcast conditions, with cloud bases between 6,000 and 8,000 feet (1,800 and 2,400 m) MSL, rain showers changing to snow, and ceilings dropping to 400 to 600 feet (120 to 180 m) above ground level. Visibility was expected to drop to one-half mile (one kilometer) in the snow, and atmospheric icing was expected in the areas of snow and clouds, with the freezing level at 9,000 feet (2,700 m) and dropping to near the surface after passing the weather front. The forecast was for heavy turbulence and strong downbursts along the east slope of the mountains south of the front.

== Flight ==
The flight plan filed with air traffic control called for instrument flight rules at 15,000 feet (4,600 m) via the Green 3 and Blue 76 airways. The flight, originally scheduled to arrive in Casper at 8:58 a.m., had a revised scheduled arrival time of 10:00 a.m. after the maintenance delay in Salt Lake City. As the aircraft flew over Sinclair, Wyoming at 15,000 feet (4,600 m) en route to Casper, the pilot of Western Airlines Flight 31 contacted the crew of Flight 34. Flight 31 was flying the return leg of the flight from Minneapolis to Los Angeles with the same intermediate stops. Flight 31's pilot advised the crew of Flight 34 that the weather in Casper had deteriorated below the minimum visibility rules, and that it would be bypassing Casper. As Flight 31 was holding east of Casper awaiting clearance to proceed to Salt Lake City, it encountered moderate to heavy turbulence and light to moderate icing, which the pilot relayed to Flight 34. Another Western Airlines flight, a Douglas DC-3 operating Flight 53 from Billings, Montana to Denver, landed at Casper at 9:18 a.m. and did not attempt to take off again until 10:05 p.m. due to unsafe weather conditions. At 9:00 a.m., a third Western Airlines flight, a DC-3 operating Flight 53 from Cheyenne, Wyoming to Great Falls, Montana, encountered moderate to severe air turbulence and moderate wing icing while approaching Douglas, Wyoming in the vicinity of Casper, and turned around to land back in Cheyenne.

As Flight 34 approached Casper, the adverse weather conditions continued in the area, and the crew elected to overfly the scheduled stop and proceed to Rapid City. The air route traffic control center issued a new clearance to descend to 13,000 feet (4,000 m) and proceed to Rapid City via the Blue 37 and Red 2 airways. After receiving the clearance, the flight requested an altitude of 17,000 feet (5,200 m), which was approved. At 10:10 a.m., Flight 34 reported its position over Casper at 17,000 feet, estimating its arrival at the Wright Junction intersection at 10:27 a.m. The Wright Junction location is 122 miles (196 km) west of Rapid City, 40 miles (64 km) south of Gillette, Wyoming, and 80 miles (130 km) northeast of Casper, where the route calls for a 45-degree turn to the east toward Rapid City. The area between Wright Junction and Rapid City is extremely rugged and sparsely inhabited.

At 10:25 a.m., the flight reported its position over the Wright Junction intersection at 17,000 feet and estimated its arrival at Rapid City at 10:50. The airline company radio operator gave the 9:30 en route weather update and the 10:10 Rapid City terminal weather update, which was acknowledged by the crew at 10:27. At 10:41 the Rapid City radio operator attempted to contact the aircraft to deliver a clearance for an instrument approach for Rapid City. After receiving no response, the radio operator continued to attempt to reach the aircraft until 10:53, when he contacted the Denver company dispatcher to advise that contact with the aircraft had been lost. At 11:06, with still no word from the aircraft, emergency procedures were initiated.

== Search ==
The initial hope was that the aircraft had developed radio problems, had passed over Rapid City, and continued on to Minneapolis or to the eastern part of South Dakota where weather conditions were better. When the aircraft never arrived, the Cheyenne office of Western Airlines sent an aircraft to Denver to pick up company officials to coordinate a search of the area around Rapid City. A Western Airlines DC-3 took off from Casper to follow the missing plane's route, but it had to turn back because of the storm. Bad weather in the area kept most aircraft grounded and unable to begin a search.

Air Force officials at Lowry Air Force Base in Denver estimated the flight had gone down somewhere between Casper and Rapid City and concentrated the first search efforts on that area. It dispatched Grumman HU-16 Albatross search planes equipped with paramedics and parachutists at intervals to fly search along the route to Rapid City, then return along the same route. The planes searched Friday afternoon and through the night, flying along the route dropping high intensity flares to illuminate the area. About four inches (ten centimeters) of snow fell on the search area, with snow at higher elevations reaching over one foot (thirty centimeters) deep. Temperatures in the area fell to freezing that night, which led searchers to doubt whether any survivors of a crash would have been able to survive the nighttime temperatures.

The next morning, the weather cleared enough to allow the Wyoming National Guard, the Wyoming Wing Civil Air Patrol, and private planes to join the search. More than 50 planes participated, searching 30,000 square miles (78,000 km^{2}) over eastern Wyoming and the mountains of southwestern South Dakota. Light snow squalls prevented small aircraft from searching the Black Hills area of South Dakota, but the weather cleared up by the afternoon. Ground search efforts began throughout the area involving volunteers and officers from the Wyoming Highway Patrol and the South Dakota Highway Patrol. Ground search efforts initially focused on an area about 20 miles (30 km) west of the South Dakota border, about 60 miles (100 km) southeast of Gillette, because a rancher had reported hearing a low-flying plane in the area just minutes after the missing aircraft had reported its position at Wright Junction. In Deadwood, South Dakota, the Sheriff's office directed a ground search involving 50 men after a resident reported seeing a flare in the area on the night of the crash. A ham radio operator from Hot Springs, South Dakota reporting hearing faint SOS signals from the Elk Mountain region in southern Wyoming. Officials looked into the radio signal report, but were skeptical because it would have been far easier for any potential crash survivors to build a fire that would have been visible from the air than it would have been for them to improvise some radio equipment to send distress signals.

The search continued the following day, with the number of participating aircraft increasing to 100. Late that afternoon, a Western Air Lines DC-3 search plane flying low over eastern Campbell County, Wyoming, less than one mile (one point six kilometers) from the Weston County line, spotted the wreckage of Flight 34 on the ground near Bacon Creek. The pilots had spotted colored fragments of debris on the ground, the largest of which was about three feet (one meter) in diameter. It was an area they had flown over the previous day, but snow that may have been covering the crash site may have melted enough to reveal the wreckage. The pilots called in the location of the crash site to Rapid City at 4:05 p.m., after most of the private search planes had already returned to their bases. Ground rescue teams were sent to the area, but the search crew had incorrectly reported their position as over a ridge north of Bacon Creek, and searchers unsuccessfully combed the area until midnight when they gave up due to darkness and blizzard conditions.

The next morning, aerial searchers returned to the area and relocated the wreckage about one-half mile (one kilometer) southwest of Bacon Creek. The crash site was about 20 miles (30 km) northeast of Wright, Wyoming, at the southern end of the Rochelle Hills. It was found in a hilly, rocky, sagebrush-covered area at about 4,700 feet (1,400 m) above sea level. Western Air Lines officials said the location of the wreckage showed the aircraft was flying on course along the scheduled route when it crashed. Initial investigations suggested the plane was intact when it hit the ground, plowing a hole five feet (1.5 m) deep and scattering debris over an area 1,500 feet (460 m) long by 500 feet (150 m) wide. There were no signs any of the occupants had survived the initial crash, and the victims were for the most part unidentifiable. The plane carried about 800 US gallons (3,000 L) of fuel at the time of the crash, and there were signs a ground fire had ignited after the impact.

== Aircraft ==
The aircraft was a Convair CV-240-1 radial engine aircraft, serial number 37, registered as tail number N8407H. It had been manufactured in 1948 and at the time of the crash it had been operated for 12,145 hours. It was powered by two Pratt & Whitney R-2800 Double Wasp 18-cylinder engines. The airline had operated this type of aircraft since taking its first delivery in mid-1948, and purchased it with the intent of replacing all of its older Douglas aircraft on its short-haul routes.

== Passengers and crew ==
The flight carried six passengers and three crew members, all residents of the United States. The captain was 39-year-old M.R. Cawley, a resident of Bountiful, Utah. He had been employed at Western Air Lines for 12 years and had 9,803 hours of logged flight experience. During the investigation of the crash, his coworkers described him as being an experienced pilot with a high level of poise in stressful situations. The first officer was Robert E. Crowther, a resident of Salt Lake City. He was 35 years old and a native of Emmett, Idaho. He served eight years in the United States Army Air Forces and was discharged at the rank of captain in 1948.

== Investigation ==
After the discovery of the crash site, the Civil Aeronautics Board (CAB) sent a team of investigators to the area. The team arrived on March 1, but they were limited by the weather conditions, which included freezing temperatures, high winds, and snow. The team first focused on the recovery and identification of the victims, which they completed by March 2. Some of the victims had to be identified from pieces of their clothing, items of jewelry, personal items, and hair samples. The remains were taken to Gillette, Wyoming, where they were placed in sealed caskets, then taken to Casper to be flown home to their families. Investigators on the ground gathered mail that the aircraft had been carrying, and brought anything that was still intact to the Gillette Post Office for forwarding. Due to the harsh weather conditions, investigators were only able to make a limited examination of the wreckage as it was found at the crash scene, then the parts of the wreckage were numbered and identified, and their locations were recorded on a distribution chart, and it was transported to Ellsworth Air Force Base in Rapid City. There, the structural components of the aircraft were laid out on a hangar floor to be studied in greater detail.

Investigators searched over a twenty-mile-wide (32 km) area over the last thirty miles (48 km) of the aircraft's flight path for any witnesses who may have seen or heard the flight. Because it had been snowing heavily when the plane crashed, there were no eyewitnesses, but investigators identified twelve people who had heard an aircraft flying overhead on the morning of the accident. All of the witnesses described the sound of the aircraft as though it was flying much lower than planes ordinarily flew in the area, but the sound of the engines seemed normal to them. Most of the witnesses described the plane flying in the same general direction, but two of them said they heard it twice in a short period of time and from different directions, as though it had circled.

A two-day board of inquiry was held by the CAB in Denver in May 1954, during which they took testimony from 32 witnesses and investigators. Investigators testified that they could not determine the exact time of the crash, but a watch found in the wreckage had stopped at 10:32. They testified that they had not found any evidence of structural or engine failure in the aircraft before the crash. According to company records, the gross weight of the aircraft was 36,990 pounds (16,780 kg), which was 2,144 pounds (973 kg) less than the maximum allowed takeoff weight, and the center of gravity was within approved limits.

The aircraft was not equipped with flight data recorder or a cockpit voice recorder. Flight data recorders were not required on passenger aircraft before July 1958, and even then only in aircraft that flew higher than 25,000 feet (7,600 m). Further investigation of the wreckage did not turn up any evidence of structural failure or malfunction of the control surfaces, and both engines appeared to have been working. The radio equipment was set to the correct frequencies, the cockpit instruments appeared to be functioning, and the heat and anti-icing valves were found in the operating position. There was no sign of an in-flight fire, the landing gear and wing flaps were retracted, and damage to the pilot seats indicated that both seats were occupied at the time of the crash.

Investigators did, however, discover three small pieces of ice, about the size of a man's little finger, inside one of the engine carburetors at the scene of the crash. The pieces matched the shape of the folds in the rubber boot that was attached above the carburetor intake, but investigators had no way of determining whether the ice was present before the crash, or whether it entered the carburetor after the carburetor and boot had been detached from the engine by impact and was in a position to receive falling snow in the days after the accident. The finding raised the question of whether ice buildup in the air intakes had caused the engines to lose power, but pilots experienced with the type of aircraft testified that the Convair aircraft was designed with a very effective carburetor heat system to fight icing in extreme conditions.

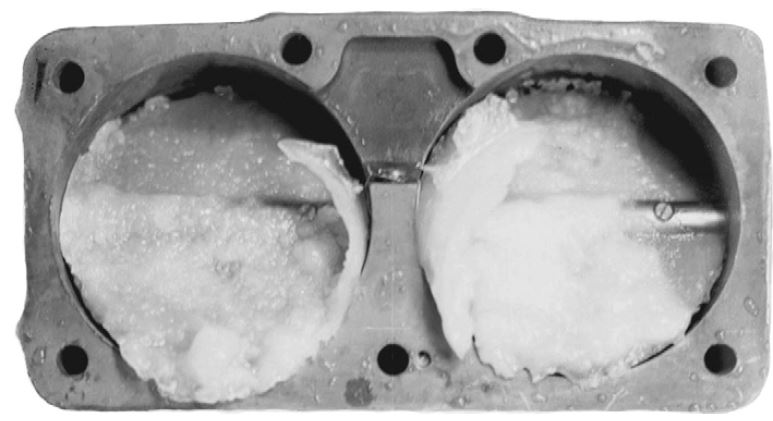
Top view of an aircraft engine carburetor showing ice buildup in the air intake

A large amount of attention was paid to the possibility of different types of icing that may have occurred in flight. The weather conditions at the time including the likelihood that heavy icing conditions would have occurred at 17,000 feet (5,200 m) altitude. Those conditions could have caused icing in the engine carburetors, or on the flight surfaces. The Convair CV-240 was only certificated to fly in light icing conditions. However, pilots experienced with the aircraft reported that the carburetor and wing de-icing systems on the aircraft were very efficient and probably would have dissipated any ice buildup in a short amount of time. Investigators doubted that any ice accumulation severe enough to cause a problem would have persisted long enough to cause such a rapid loss of 12,000 feet (3,700 m) of altitude, and that the conditions at lower altitudes where the snow was melting as it reached the surface should have helped remove any ice buildup.

CAB investigators evaluated several possibilities that could have caused the crash. One idea was that an in-flight fire could have been the cause of the crash, but investigators found little evidence of a fire. Some pieces of wreckage were found with fire damage but investigators demonstrated that the damage occurred from ground fires after the crash. Another idea was that the crew could have become incapacitated during the flight, but the normal tone of voice of the crew during its last radio report, the lack of evidence of an in-flight fire, and the lack of evidence that the crew had used the oxygen masks in the cockpit led investigators to conclude that this theory was not likely. Investigators also found no evidence that an explosion or other types of sabotage to the aircraft had occurred. There was a possibility that there was a malfunction of the control system in flight caused by ice or another object becoming lodged and later breaking loose at the time of impact. Investigators were unable to find any evidence of such a malfunction, but identified it as a possible cause. They explored the possibility that the cargo that was being transported in the passenger cabin had shifted or become loose and had created a hazard, but investigators concluded that the method of securing the cargo that had been used was adequate and that the company had not previously experienced this type of trouble. None of the witnesses on the ground saw any lightning during the storm and weather records did not indicate that any lightning had occurred. The lack of any marks from a lightning strike on any of the parts of the wreckage suggested that a lightning strike was not a likely cause.

CAB investigators were only able to determine the probable cause of the crash as "a sudden emergency of undetermined origin under adverse weather conditions resulting in rapid descent and impact with the ground at high speed".
