= 243rd Air Traffic Control Squadron =

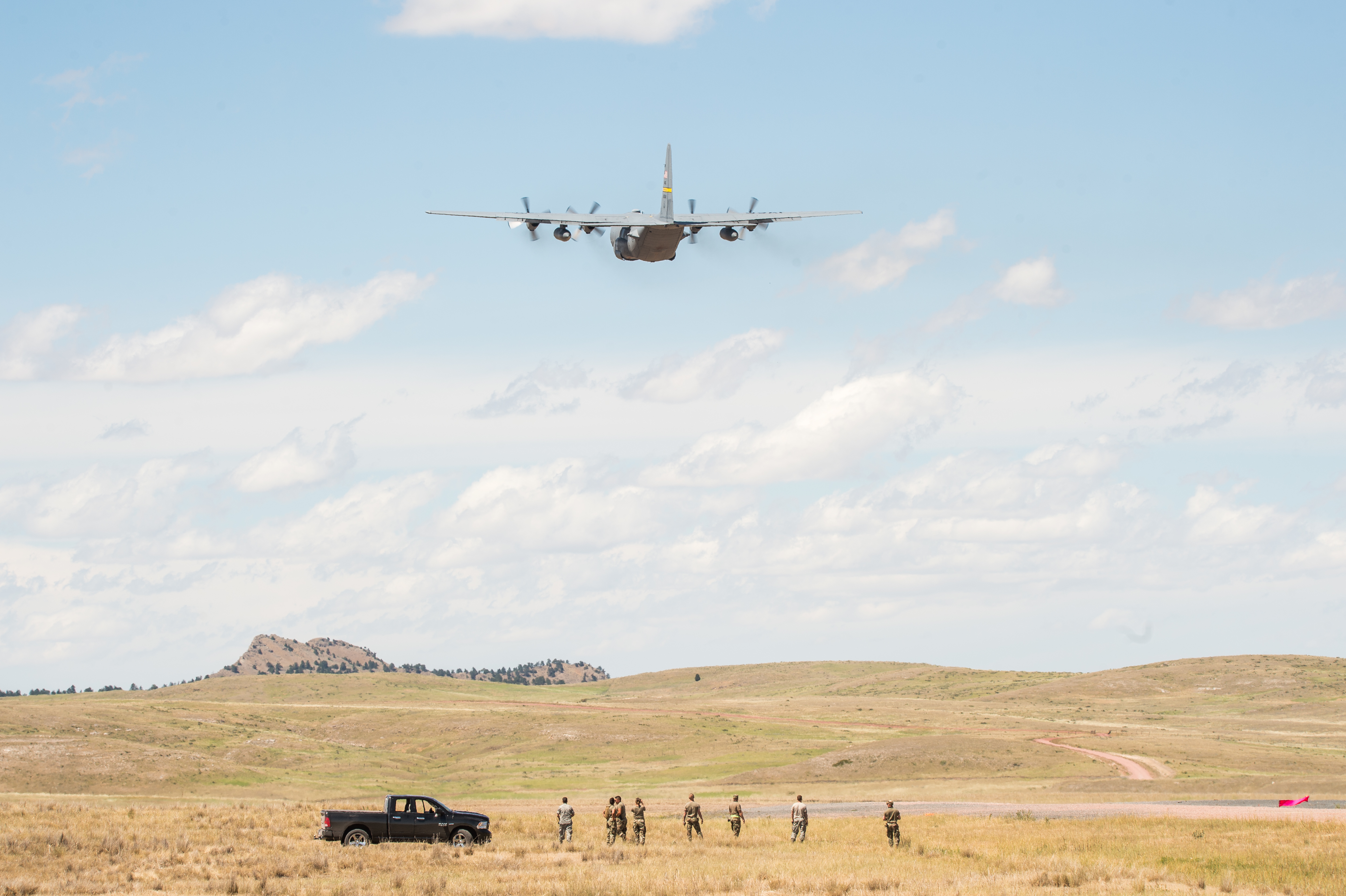
- 243rd ATCS members watch as a C-130 Hercules under their control departs a dirt airstrip during an exercise, 2020
- Active: 1996–present
- Country: United States
- Allegiance: Wyoming
- Branch: Air National Guard
- Role: Mobile air traffic control
- Part of: Wyoming Air National Guard
- Garrison/HQ: Cheyenne Air National Guard Base, Wyoming

Commanders
- Current commander: Major Dan Hochhalter

Insignia
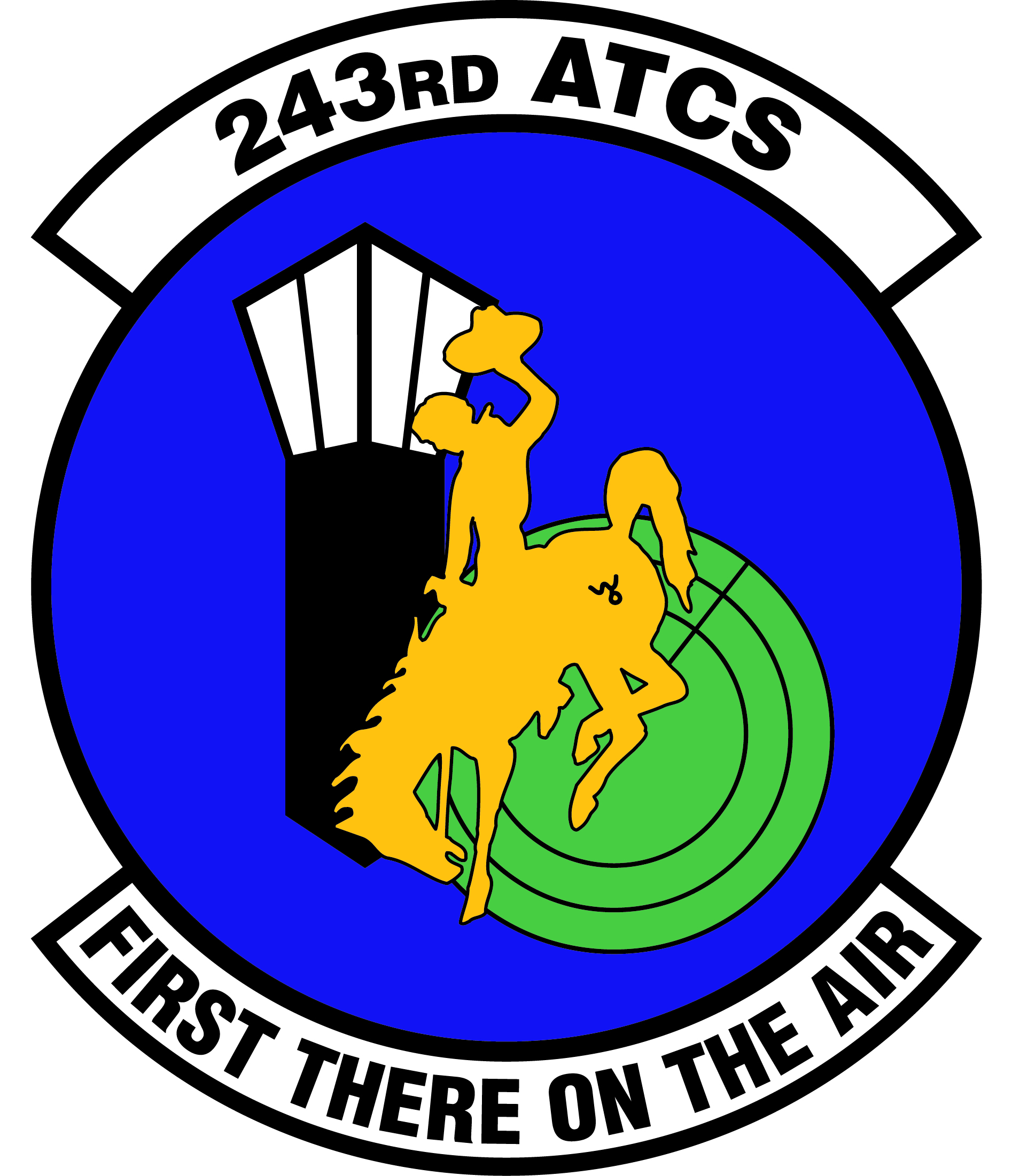
- 243rd Air Traffic Control Squadron emblem

The 243rd Air Traffic Control Squadron (243 ATCS) is a unit of the Wyoming Air National Guard specializing in mobile air traffic control. The squadron is stationed at Cheyenne Air National Guard Base, Wyoming.

== Mission ==
The 243rd ATCS is one of only ten ANG Air Traffic Control Squadrons located throughout the United States. Their mission is to deploy and employ Air Traffic Control services worldwide.

An important part of the Guard air traffic control mission includes establishing bases in locations without existing air traffic control facilities.

== History ==
242 Air Traffic Control Flight was given a change of station order on 1 July 1996 from Spokane, Washington to Cheyenne, Wyoming. The 242 Air Traffic Control Flight was redesignated the 243 Air Traffic Control Squadron on 1 November 1996.

The 243rd was one of the first units activated in support of Operation Enduring Freedom after the September 11 attacks. The unit was deployed to Jacobabad, Pakistan.

== Awards ==
- 2014 – RAPCON D. Ray Hardin Air Traffic Control Facility of the Year

== Career Fields ==
The 243rd ATCS has numerous career fields including: Air Traffic Controller, Airfield Systems, Ground Radar Systems, Electrical Power Production, Heating Ventilation and Air Conditioning (HVAC), Logistics Plans, Material Management Administrative, and Personnel.

== Bases stationed ==
- Cheyenne Air National Guard Base, Wyoming (1996 – present)
