= United Air Lines Flight 23 =

1933 aircraft bombing in Indiana, United States

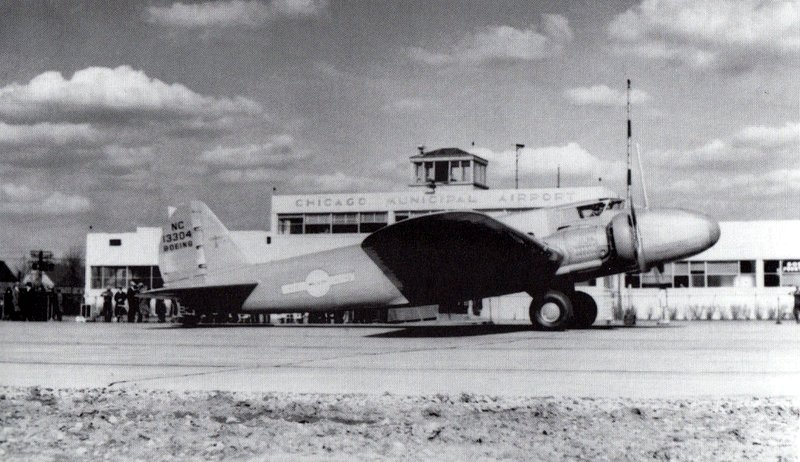
- NC13304, the aircraft involved in the incident.

Incident
- Date: October 10, 1933
- Summary: Deliberate on-board explosion
- Site: Near Chesterton, Indiana, United States; 41°34′12″N 86°59′18″W

Aircraft
- Aircraft type: Boeing 247
- Operator: United Air Lines
- IATA flight No.: UA23
- ICAO flight No.: UAL23
- Call sign: UNITED 23
- Registration: NC13304
- Flight origin: Newark, New Jersey, United States
- 1st stopover: Cleveland, Ohio, US
- Last stopover: Chicago, Illinois, United States
- Destination: Oakland, California, United States
- Occupants: 7
- Passengers: 4
- Crew: 3
- Fatalities: 7
- Survivors: 0

United Air Lines Flight 23 was a regularly scheduled flight operated by United Air Lines (Note: In 1933, United Airlines was known as United Air Lines. The company name was changed in 1974.) between Newark, New Jersey, and Oakland, California, with intermediate stops. On October 10, 1933, the Boeing 247 airliner serving the flight—registered as NC13304—exploded and crashed near Chesterton, Indiana, United States, en route from Cleveland to Chicago. It carried three crew and four passengers. All aboard died in the incident, which was caused by an on-board explosive device. Eyewitnesses on the ground reported hearing an explosion shortly after 9 pm and seeing the aircraft in flames at an altitude around 1,000 feet (300 m). A second explosion followed after the aircraft crashed. The crash site was adjacent to a gravel road about 5 miles (8 km) outside of Chesterton, centered in a wooded area on the Jackson Township farm of James Smiley.

Investigators combed through the debris and were confronted with unusual evidence; the toilet and baggage compartment had been smashed into fragments. Shards of metal riddled the inside of the toilet door, while the other side of the door was free of the metal fragments. The tail section had been severed just aft of the toilet and was found mostly intact, with two of the victims' bodies nearby, almost 1 mile (1.6 km) away from the main wreckage.

The Federal Bureau of Investigation declassified 324 documents related to the investigation on November 16, 2017. It is notable for being the first proven act of air sabotage in the history of commercial aviation.

== Incident ==
United States Bureau of Investigation investigator Melvin Purvis said, "Our investigation convinced me that the tragedy resulted from an explosion somewhere in the region of the baggage compartment in the rear of the aircraft. Everything in front of the compartment was blown forward, everything behind blown backward, and things at the side outward." He also noted that the gasoline tanks "were crushed in, showing [that] there was no explosion in them."

== Investigation ==
Dr. Carl Davis of the Porter County coroner's office and experts from the Crime Detection Laboratory at Northwestern University examined evidence from the incident and concluded that it was caused by a bomb, with nitroglycerin as the probable explosive. One of the passengers was seen carrying a brown package onto the aircraft in Newark, but investigators found the package amidst the wreckage and ruled it out as the source of the explosion. Investigators found a rifle in the wreckage, but they determined that a passenger carried it aboard as luggage, as he was en route to a shoot at Chicago's North Shore Gun Club. No suspect was ever identified in this incident and it remains unsolved.

Pilot Captain Terrant, co-pilot A.T. Ruby, stewardess Alice Scribner, and all four passengers were killed. Scribner was the first United stewardess to be killed in an aircraft crash.

== See also ==
- 1933 in aviation
- List of accidents and incidents involving commercial aircraft
- List of firsts in aviation
