= 1934 United Air Lines Boeing 247 crash =

1934 aviation accident in the United States

Coordinates: 40°45′N 111°53′W

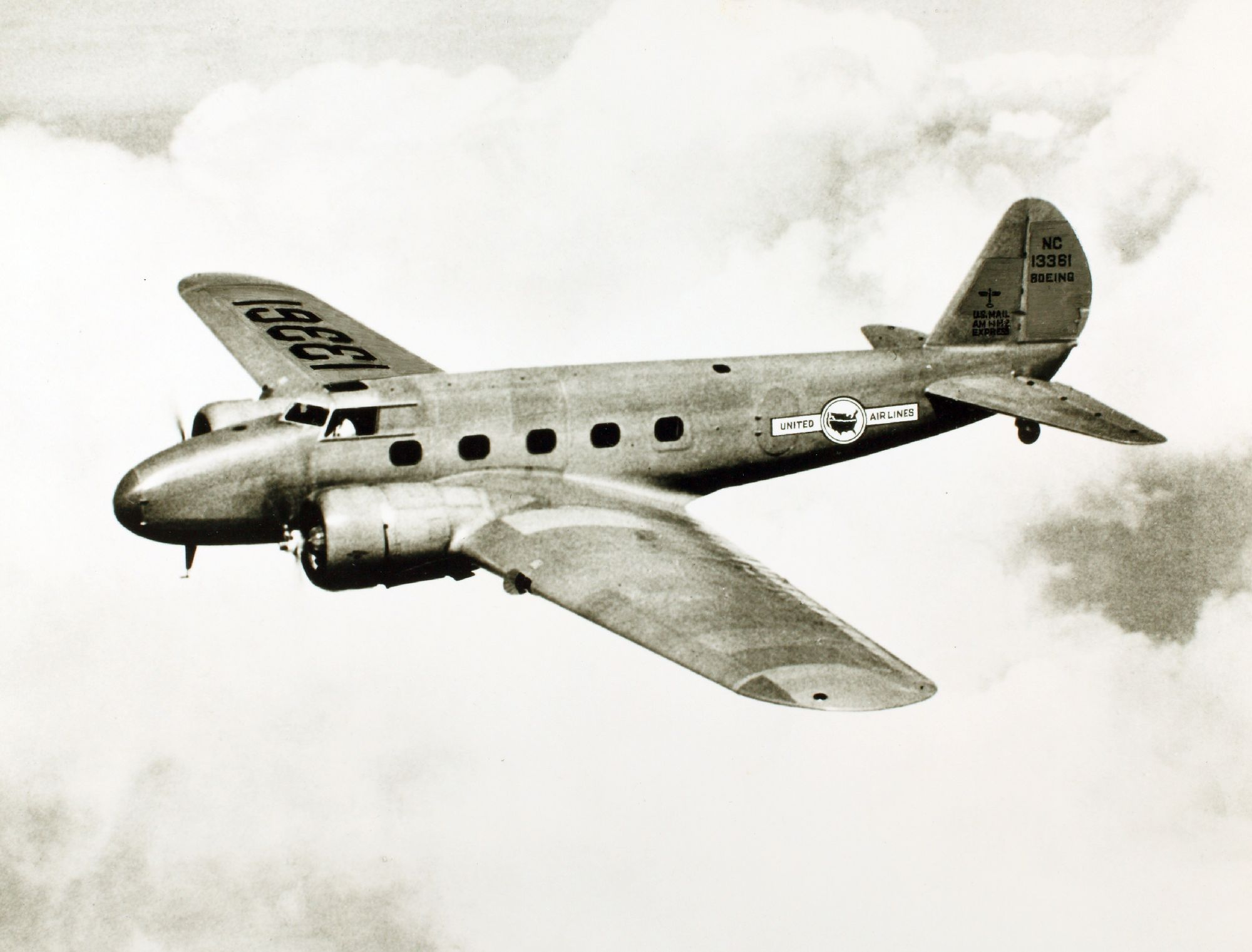
- A United Air Lines Boeing 247 similar to the accident aircraft

Accident
- Date: February 23, 1934
- Summary: Controlled flight into terrain in inclement weather
- Site: Parley's Canyon, Summit County, Utah, United States

Aircraft
- Aircraft type: Boeing 247
- Operator: Boeing Air Transport
- Registration: NC13357
- Flight origin: Salt Lake City, Utah, United States
- Destination: Cheyenne, Wyoming, United States
- Occupants: 8
- Passengers: 5
- Crew: 3
- Fatalities: 8
- Survivors: 0

The 1934 United Air Lines Boeing 247 crash was an accident involving a Boeing Air Transport-operated United Air Lines scheduled flight of a Boeing 247, which crashed in bad weather shortly after departing Salt Lake City, Utah, on February 23, 1934, killing all eight on board. The cause was not immediately determined, but poor weather was considered a factor.

== History of flight ==
At 14:00 on Friday, February 23, 1934, United Air Lines Boeing 247, registered as NC13357, with serial number 1739, departed Salt Lake City, Utah, bound for Cheyenne, Wyoming. The weather was poor, with snow and sleet throughout the region, with up to 7 in (18 cm) of snow accumulating in the lowlands and even more at higher altitudes.

"The last word received by radio from the ill-fated plane was when pilot Lloyd Anderson signaled "All Okay" 20 minutes after the departure. When the plane did not arrive at Cheyenne on schedule, an immediate search was started."

== Search ==
Throughout Saturday, February 24, aircraft covered the routes the missing airliner might have traveled, and the United Air Lines office at Salt Lake City made phone calls "to all points in the vicinity. None of the efforts brought any definite trace of the lost plane." "Little hope remained for the safety of the crew or passengers of the plane, which it was believed must have crashed in the clouds and fog. Its fuel supply, United Air Lines officials said, would have been exhausted by 06:30 yesterday."

== Discovery ==
H.D.T. Lewis, chief of the United Air Lines at Chicago, arrived Sunday to take charge. Chief Pilot H. T. 'Slim' Lewis and his assistant, Leon D. Cuddeback, ordered a search with Rock Springs, Wyoming, as the center.

The air search began at daybreak, February 24, when two planes left the Salt Lake airport, joined by other pilots of the airline and by Lieutenant Frank Crismon, a reserve army pilot. They were aided by ground parties searching the mountains to the east. Weather, which Frank Caldwell, operations manager for United, called "the worst in the history of flying in this region," hampered rescue workers throughout the day.

Planes were sent up, two from Rock Springs, Wyoming, and six from Salt Lake City. Lewis concentrated the search in the mountains. "That plane is not more than 50 miles from here," he said. He was right. As Don Broughton and Ed Greer, United Air Lines pilots, flew over the area known as Parley's Canyon, they sighted the plane, nose down, nearly buried in the deep snow on the side of the canyon. The nose was between two giant pine trees, which stood on either side of the plane, almost hiding it from sight.

"There was no sign of life. Broughton radioed the discovery to airline headquarters at Salt Lake City.

== Recovery ==
A motor caravan was organized at Salt Lake City. Members waded through snow 4 ft (1.2 m) deep for 4 mi (6.4 km) to reach the accident site. Leon D. Cuddeback, assistant to Lewis, was the first company official to arrive. He reported that the plane was wedged between the trees in such a position that it was almost vertical.

The bodies were piled on top of one another in the wreck, just 35 mi east of Salt Lake City. All were believed to have died instantly. The pilot's wrist watches had stopped at 15:05.

== Victims ==
Lloyd Anderson, the flight's pilot, had more than 7,000 hours of flight time. He began flying at Los Angeles and obtained his license in 1926. After completing his flying course, he barnstormed and instructed on the West Coast and later opened a temporary line between Mexicali, Mazatlan, and Mexico City. He flew this route for a time. Anderson also surveyed and opened a mail line between Mazatlan and Brownsville, Texas, and later was with CAT, flying between El Paso and Mexico City. He surveyed a route between Chihuahua, Mexico, and Nogales, Arizona, and flew this route for two years. Anderson joined United on June 15, 1931, as a reserve pilot at Omaha and came to Cheyenne a short time later, flying between Omaha and Salt Lake City."

Anderson was 32 years old, was married, and had one son, 3 years old. The company stated that he was born in Canada.

The co-pilot was Eric G. Danielson, also of Cheyenne. Danielson was born in Uppsala, Sweden, and came to the United States as a child. He received his air training in the army, and was stationed at March Field, California, Kelly Field, Texas, and at Fort Crockett, Texas. He completed his student flying in 1931, and later was a pilot in the Texas National Guard. He joined United in July 1933, and was 29 years old at the time of the crash.

Among the passengers was John J. Sterling, the sitting mayor of Benton Harbor, Michigan.

== Accident site ==
The search party found the wreckage with the "nose buried deep in the earth and its broken tail standing upwards. Every part of it, except the wings, which were cracked, was smashed. In the front of the interior, the mangled bodies were heaped, that of Miss Carter on the top, indicating, it was believed, that she was in the rear of the cabin when the liner hurtled into the mountain."

It had crossed the summit of the pass and had proceeded about three-quarters of a mile on the other side when it dived. "The plane had apparently flown straight into the ground at high speed. The nose was thrust into the earth, the rear end was sticking into the air and the tail was broken off. Each wing and the body rested on three nearby pine trees."

The body of the stewardess was intact. Those of the two pilots and five passengers were mangled such that identification was possible only through jewelry and clothing.

Judge John C. Green, coroner of Summit County, Utah, took charge of the bodies as they were removed from the wreckage. They were carried over 2 mi of snowy trail, through heavy brush and rough country, to a roadhouse on the highway at the summit of Parley's Canyon, and then to Salt Lake City in an ambulance.

== Investigation ==
Two investigations into the cause of the accident were underway on February 27, at Salt Lake City. One inquiry was launched by the Department of Commerce, under E. E. Hughes, aeronautics inspector, and E. L. Yuravich, airline inspector. The other was conducted by D. B. Colyer, of Chicago, vice president of United Air Lines. Company officials were unable to hazard a guess as to the cause of the crash, "due to the fact that the plane was so nearly demolished."

Both groups returned from the crash site in the Wasatch Mountains to Salt Lake City on the night of February 26, but both admitted to an inability to reach any conclusions. Unfavorable weather, they agreed, was a contributing factor.

Hughes ventured the opinion a definite determination of the tragedy appeared impossible. "I don't know whether we will ever be able to determine the cause of the crash," said Colyer. "And it wouldn't be right to advance all the theory[s] mentioned."

Colyer was assisted in his investigation by F. E. Caldwell, of Cheyenne, operations manager; John Maxzell, of Salt Lake City, another operations manager; and a staff of pilots.

== See also ==
- United Air Lines Flight 4, another Boeing 247 that crashed under similar circumstances in 1935
