= United Air Lines Flight 4 =

1935 aviation accident

Coordinates: 41.179°N 105.253°W

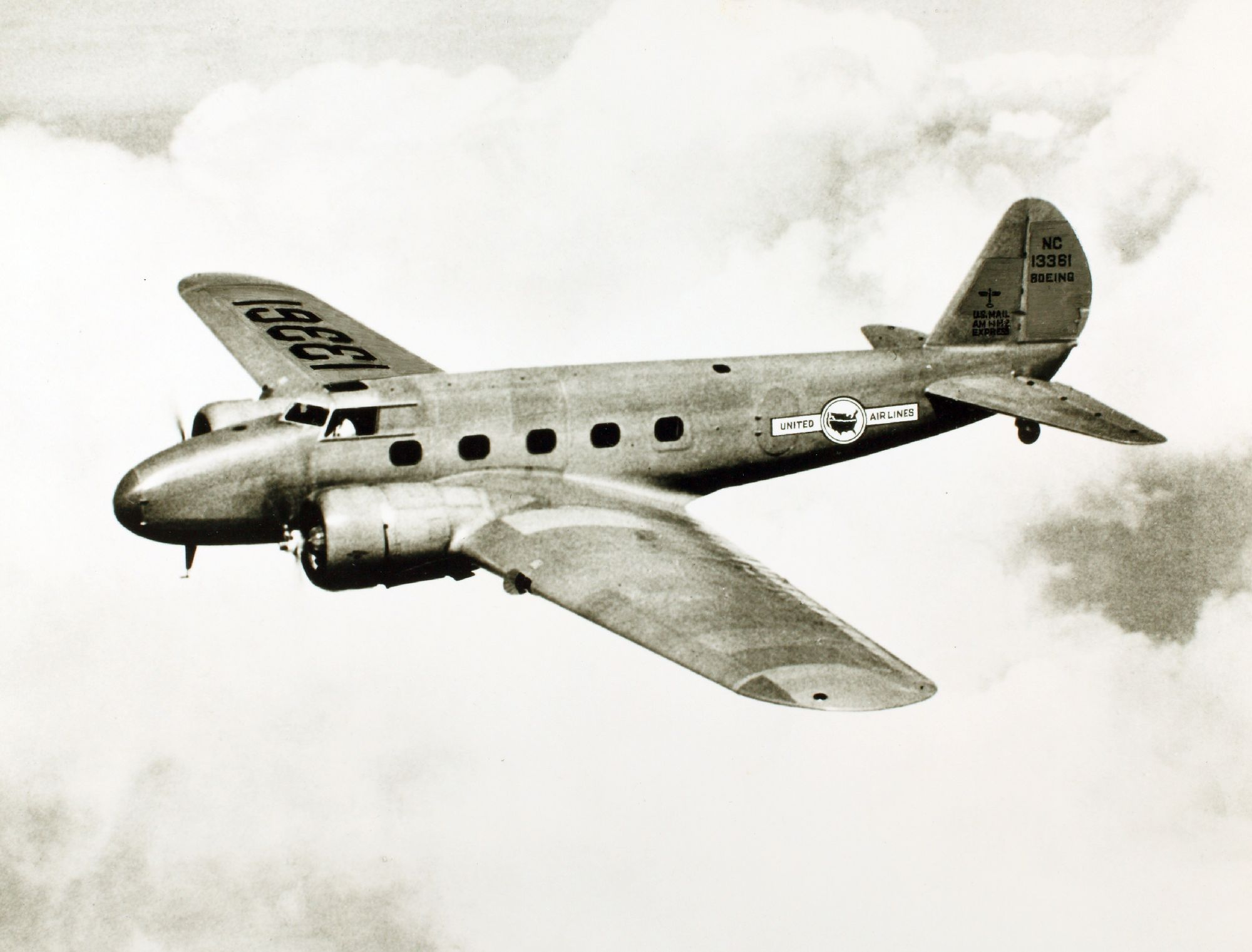
- A Boeing 247 similar to the accident aircraft

Accident
- Date: October 7, 1935
- Summary: Controlled flight into terrain caused by pilot error
- Site: Laramie County, near Silver Crown, Wyoming, USA

Aircraft
- Aircraft type: Boeing 247D
- Operator: United Airlines
- Registration: NC13317
- Flight origin: Salt Lake City, Utah, United States
- Destination: Cheyenne, Wyoming, United States
- Occupants: 12
- Passengers: 9
- Crew: 3
- Fatalities: 12
- Survivors: 0

United Air Lines Flight 4 was a Boeing 247D, registration NC-13317, operating on a scheduled flight from Salt Lake City, Utah, to Cheyenne, Wyoming, on October 7, 1935. The aircraft last contacted Cheyenne at 02:16 or 02:17 local time, reporting its position as Silver Crown beacon. Cheyenne called the flight at 02:21, and no further communications were received from the accident aircraft. At 2:00 a.m. the weather at the Cheyenne airport was recorded as clear with ceiling unlimited, air temperature of 41.7F (5.4C), and dew point 37.0F (2.8C), and winds out of the northwest at 9 miles per hour (14.4 km/h).

The wreckage was located 3 mi (4.8 km) east of Silver Crown, and 7.4 mi (12 km) northwest of the Cheyenne airport, at an elevation of 6,553 ft (1997 m). Note that the elevation of the crash site is only 370 ft (113 m) higher than the airport elevation. The aircraft struck the ground in a shallow descent just below a small knoll. Marks on the ground made by the propellers, fuselage, and engine showed the aircraft was in a normal flight attitude. Propeller marks and engine damage established the engines were developing normal power and the aircraft was at cruising speed. An untouched knoll 60 ft (18 m) further back on the flight path and 3 ft (0.9 m) higher established that the aircraft was descending. The accident claimed all souls aboard, which included 9 passengers and three flight crew.

The captain of this flight was highly experienced and familiar with the topography and unique features of the approach environment. Possible factors include darkness, sleep deprivation (captain), fog (speculative). The probable cause was determined to be pilot error in failing to monitor altitude or location.

== Important facts ==
The crash was written about in newspapers around the world. In modern parlance, the cause of this accident was "Controlled Flight into Terrain". Captain Collison had flown this route over 100 times. According to the accident report, navigation along the route from Salt Lake City, Utah, to Cheyenne, Wyoming, relied on tower-mounted rotating beacons, and the last radio communications by the crew indicated that they knew their position relative to the Silver Crown beacon located approximately 10 mi (16 km) northwest of Cheyenne, Wyoming. For some reason the crew failed to maintain sufficient altitude, and failed to notice that they were approaching the ground because of the darkness. According to the accident report, the cockpit lights were set to maximum intensity at the time of the crash, which reduces visibility outside the aircraft during night flight.

== About the air crew ==
The captain for this flight, Halston A. "Colly" Collison, was a very experienced pilot. He flew for the U.S. Air Mail Service in Wyoming and accumulated 3482 hours flying mail in single-engine biplanes. In the book "Wyoming Air Mail Pioneers," Collison is referred to as "the lucky one," because of the number of forced landings he survived while flying mail around Wyoming, which is noted for its cold temperatures, strong, gusty winds and sudden snowstorms. Some of Collison's exploits flying air mail were documented in the January, 1926, issue of National Geographic in an article written by J. Parker Van Zandt, Lt. U.S. Army Air Service pilot. Collison started flying for United Airlines sometime before 1933.

Collison's co-pilot for this trip was 27 year-old George E. Batty, who was known as "Jeb." Batty was from Denver, Colorado, and was an Army Air Corps veteran with a reputation for fearlessness.

The flight attendant on board the flight was Miss Leona Mason, who was trained as a nurse.

== About the passengers ==
Published histories include details about the passengers on the accident aircraft. This is largely due to the efforts of Kent Hargraves and Gerald Adams.

- Vincent Butler was a prominent attorney for a law firm that represented the Standard Oil Company of California, and was traveling to Chicago.
- Juliet Hillman was vacationing at a dude ranch and visiting her sister who lived in Reno. She disliked travel by train, claiming that it made her ill, and preferred to travel by air. Her father was the head of the J.H. Hillman Coke & Chemical Company.
- John F. Cushing was a Civil Engineer and at the time of the crash served as President of the Great Lakes Dredge and Dock Company. The Cushing Hall of Engineering at Notre Dame University is named after him.
- George H. Miner was trained as an automobile mechanic. Having obtained a patent in 1929 for an arcade game called "All-American Automated Baseball Game," he and his father operated an amusement machine business.
- Robert H. Renebome from Redwood City, California, was former officer on an Associated Oil tanker ship. He was a fugitive from the California police with a long criminal record; he had been wanted for several weeks on forgery charges. He had bought his ticket by phone, claiming to be a vice-president of Associated Oil, and had his ticket charged to the company's account.
- Helen Warren was a stenographer employed by United Airlines.
- Carolyn Cathcart was the mother of a United Airlines pilot named Daryl Cathcart.
- Roy Bane recently moved to Cheyenne, Wyoming, where he hoped to build a washing machine business.

Notable potential passenger not on the flight: Former U.S. President Herbert Hoover gave a speech in Oakland, California, on Oct. 6, 1935. While he planned to return east by train, he instructed his assistant to reserve a seat on this flight in case his speech went long and he missed his train. Luckily for Mr. Hoover, he made it to the train station just in time and was not a passenger on United Flight 4.

== See also ==
- 1934 United Airlines Boeing 247 crash, another controlled flight into terrain accident that happened on the same route
