= Wyoming Wing Civil Air Patrol =

- Wyoming Wing of Civil Air Patrol

Associated branches
- United States Air Force

Command staff
- Commander: Col Rod Burnett
- Deputy Commander: Lt Col Todd DePorter
- Chief of Staff: Maj Tim Anderson

Current statistics
- Cadets: 99
- Seniors: 149
- Total Membership: 248
- Website: wywg.cap.gov
- Statistics as of January 2026

The Wyoming Wing of the Civil Air Patrol (CAP) is the highest echelon of Civil Air Patrol in the state of Wyoming. Wyoming Wing headquarters are located in Cheyenne, Wyoming. The Wyoming Wing consists of over 250 cadet and adult members at over 9 locations across the state of Wyoming.

== Mission ==
The Civil Air Patrol has three primary missions: providing emergency services; offering cadet programs for youth; and providing aerospace education for CAP members and the general public.

=== Emergency services ===
The Civil Air Patrol provides emergency services, including search and rescue missions directed by the Air Force Rescue Coordination Center at Tyndall Air Force Base. The Civil Air Patrol also performs disaster relief missions, including air and ground transportation and an extensive communications network; and humanitarian services, including transporting time-sensitive medical materials including blood and human tissue, often on behalf of the Red Cross when conventional methods of transport are unavailable.

The Civil Air Patrol provides Air Force support through the conducting of light transport, communications support, and low-altitude route surveys. In addition, CAP offers support to counter-drug operations.

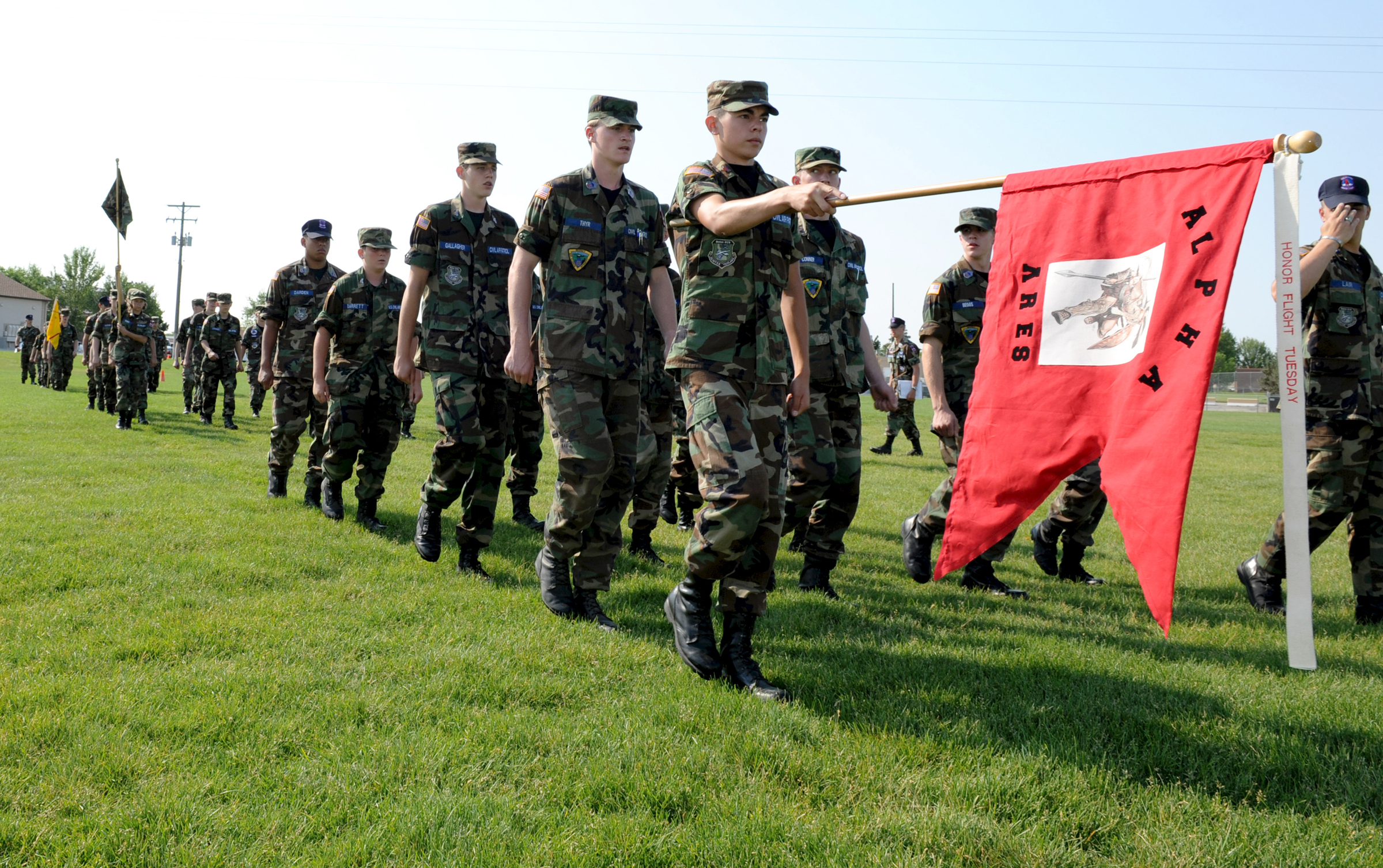
Cadets from the Idaho, Montana, Wyoming and Nevada Wings of the Civil Air Patrol practice drill for their pass and review ceremony during the Mountain Eagle II Encampment.

In 2014, the Wyoming Wing was activated to provide aerial photography of flood damage for the Wyoming National Guard. In May 2020, the Wyoming Wing assisted in Wyoming's response to the COVID-19 pandemic. The Wyoming Wing was charged with flying coronavirus test kits from Sublette County to the Wyoming Public Health Laboratory in Cheyenne.

In June 2022, two Wyoming Wing aircrews were asked and answered the call to fly Disaster Relief aerial photography flights. Both aircrews spent the day photographing their assigned routes from the air to help provide a better overview of how bad the historic flood was and how much damage was done.

=== Cadet programs ===
The Civil Air Patrol offers a cadet program to youth aged 12-21. Cadets take part in a 16-step program which covers aerospace education, leadership training, physical fitness and moral leadership.

The Wyoming Wing offers an encampment which provides cadets with additional training.

=== Aerospace education ===
The Civil Air Patrol offers aerospace education to two different audiences: volunteer CAP members and the general public. The internal aerospace education program for CAP members has two parts: cadet and senior. Cadets complete aerospace education as one of the requirements to progress through the achievement levels of the cadet program, while senior members are expected to familiarize themselves with the AE program for cadets and aerospace issues.

CAP's external aerospace programs for the general public are conducted through the nation's educational system. Each year, CAP sponsors workshops focusing on advances in aerospace technology in various states across the United States. CAP's aerospace education members receive more than 20 free aerospace education classroom materials.

== Organization ==
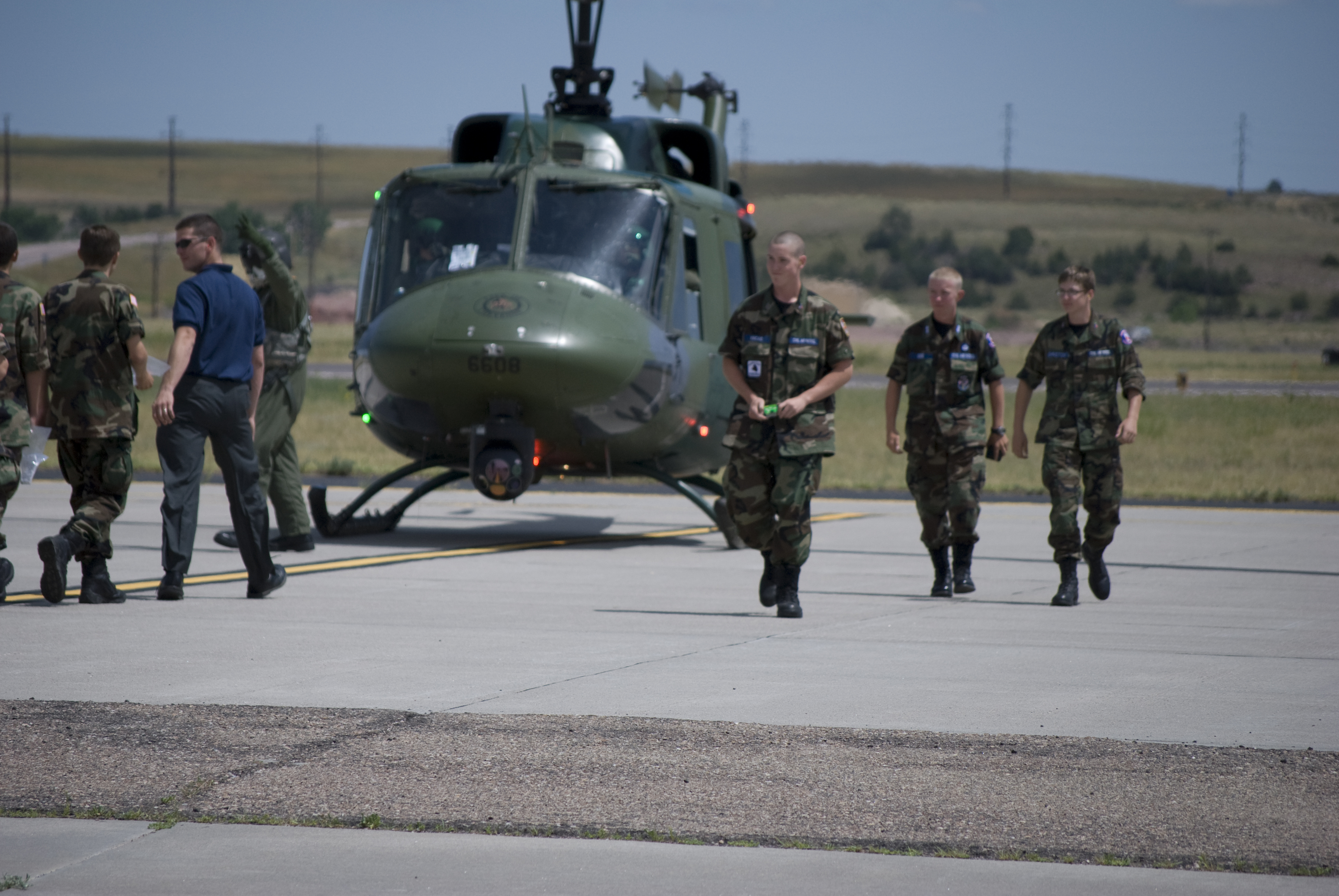
Civil Air Patrol cadets take turns riding in a UH1 from F.E. Warren Air Force Base.

Squadrons of the Wyoming Wing
Designation	Squadron Name	Location	Notes
RMR-WY-002	492nd Emergency Services Composite Squadron	Casper	
RMR-WY-019	Teton County Senior Squadron	Jackson	
RMR-WY-059	Capt Michael S Walker Memorial Composite Squadron	Wheatland	
RMR-WY-066	Cheyenne Composite Squadron	Cheyenne	
RMR-WY-069	Powder River Composite Squadron	Gillette	
RMR-WY-072	Laramie Valley Composite Squadron	Laramie	
RMR-WY-075	Heart Mountain Composite Squadron	Powell	
RMR-WY-044	Wind River Composite Squadron	Lander	
RMR-WY-078	Cloud Peak Composite Squadron	Buffalo	

== Wyoming Wing Aircraft ==
Wyoming Wing has five aircraft based in the state. They are kept in a state of readiness to respond to emergency services missions and are positioned based on need and availability of pilots. Additionally, aircraft are also used to provide orientation flights to cadets and develop proficiency and training of CAP pilots and aircrew members. Aircraft maintenance is performed at two facilities in Wyoming.

Aircraft Type	N-number	CAP call sign	Regular Basing
Cessna C182T (G1000)	N897CP	CAP4997	KCYS
Cessna C182T (G1000)	N344CA	CAP4944	KRKS
Cessna C182T (G1000)	N294CP	CAP4994	KCPR
Cessna C182T (G1000)	N353CP	CAP4953	KGCC
Cessna T206H (G1000)	N261CP	CAP4961	KJAC

== See also ==
- Awards and decorations of the Civil Air Patrol
- Wyoming Air National Guard
