= Wyoming Air National Guard =

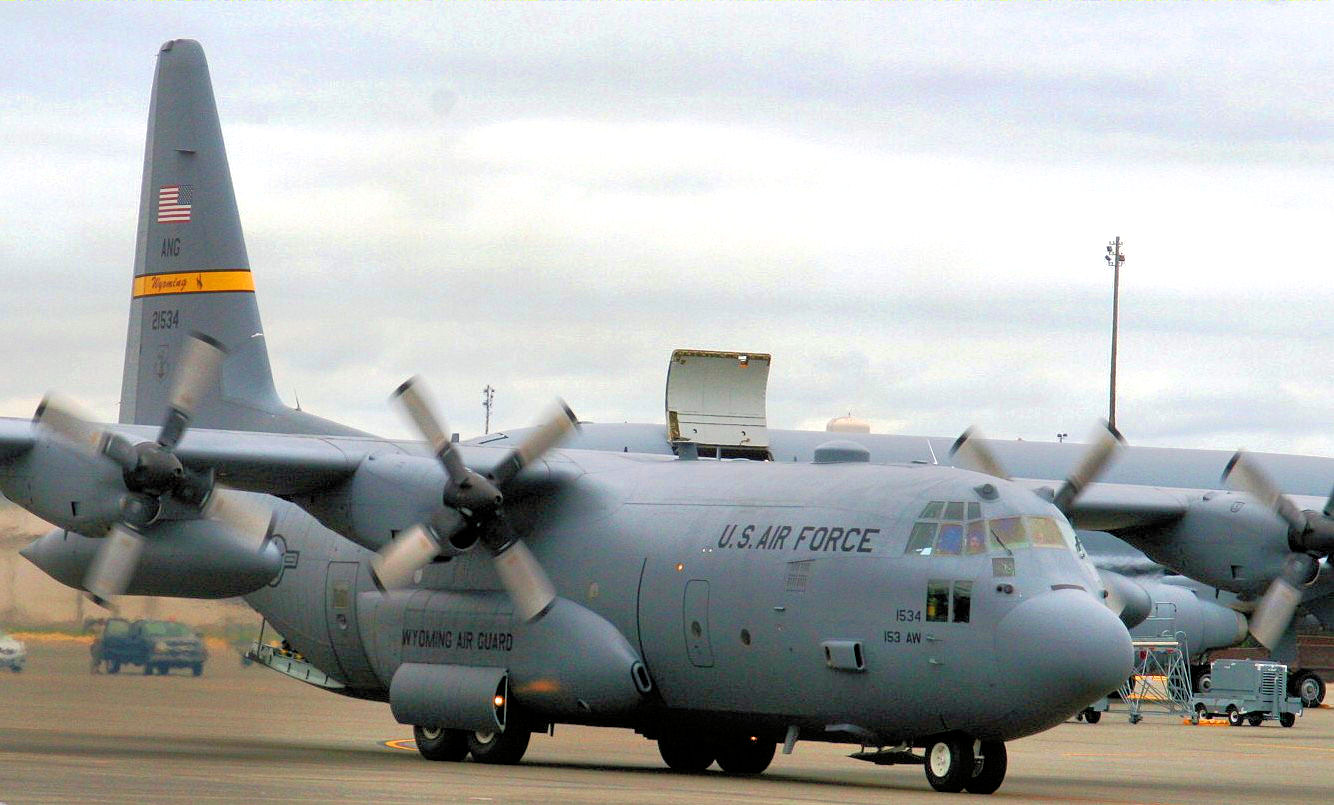
- A Lockheed C-130H Hercules of the 187th Airlift Squadron. The 187th is the oldest unit in the Wyoming Air National Guard, having over 60 years of service to the state and nation.
- Active: 11 August 1946 - present
- Country: United States
- Allegiance: Wyoming
- Branch: Air National Guard
- Type: State militia, military reserve force
- Role: "To meet state and federal mission responsibilities Augmentation of active USAF units in transport, command and control, and air traffic control
- Part of: Wyoming Military Department; United States National Guard Bureau
- Garrison/HQ: Wyoming Military Department, 5410 Bishop Blvd. Cheyenne, Wyoming, 82009

Commanders
- Civilian leadership: President Donald Trump (Commander-in-Chief); Troy Meink (Secretary of the Air Force); Governor Mark Gordon (Governor of the State of Wyoming)
- State military leadership: Major General Greg Porter

Insignia
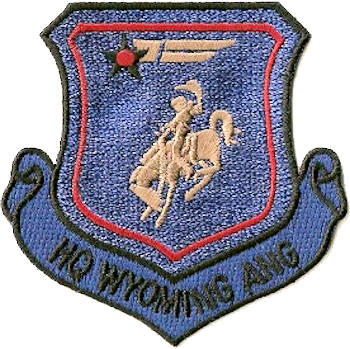
- Emblem of the Wyoming Air National Guard

Aircraft flown
- Transport: C-130H Hercules

The Wyoming Air National Guard (WY ANG) is the aerial militia of the State of Wyoming, United States of America. It is, along with the Wyoming Army National Guard, an element of the Wyoming National Guard, National Guard and United States National Guard Bureau. It's also a reserve of the United States Air Force.

As state militia units, the units in the Wyoming Air National Guard are not in the active-duty United States Air Force chain of command. They are under the jurisdiction of the governor of Wyoming though the office of the Wyoming Adjutant General unless they are federalized by order of the president of the United States. The Wyoming Air National Guard is headquartered in Cheyenne, and its commander is currently Major General Greg Porter.

== Overview ==
Under the "Total Force" concept, Wyoming Air National Guard units are considered to be Air Reserve Components (ARC) of the United States Air Force (USAF). Wyoming ANG units are trained and equipped by the Air Force and are operationally gained by a major command of the USAF if federalized. In addition, the Wyoming Air National Guard forces are assigned to Air Expeditionary Forces and are subject to deployment tasking orders along with their active duty and Air Force Reserve counterparts in their assigned cycle deployment window.

Along with their federal reserve obligations, as state militia units the elements of the Wyoming ANG are subject to being activated by order of the governor to provide protection of life and property, and preserve peace, order and public safety. State missions include disaster relief in times of earthquakes, hurricanes, floods and forest fires, search and rescue, protection of vital public services, and support to civil defense.

== Components ==
The Wyoming Air National Guard consists of three major units:

- 153d Airlift Wing

Established 11 August 1946 (as: 187th Fighter Squadron); operates: C-130H Hercules
Stationed at: Cheyenne Regional Airport (Air National Guard Base), Cheyenne; Gained by: Air Mobility Command
Performs tactical airlift providing rapid airlift and airdrop of cargo and troops.

- 253d Command and Control Group

Stationed at: F.E. Warren AFB, Cheyenne; Gained by: Air Force Global Strike Command
Mobilizes communications, automated data processing, and combat logistics for United States Northern Command (USNORTHCOM) commanders.

- 243rd Air Traffic Control Squadron (USAF)

Stationed at: Cheyenne Regional Airport (Air National Guard Base), Cheyenne; Gained by: Air Combat Command
Provide personnel and equipment ready to deploy and provide Air Traffic Services worldwide.

== History ==
=== Cold War ===
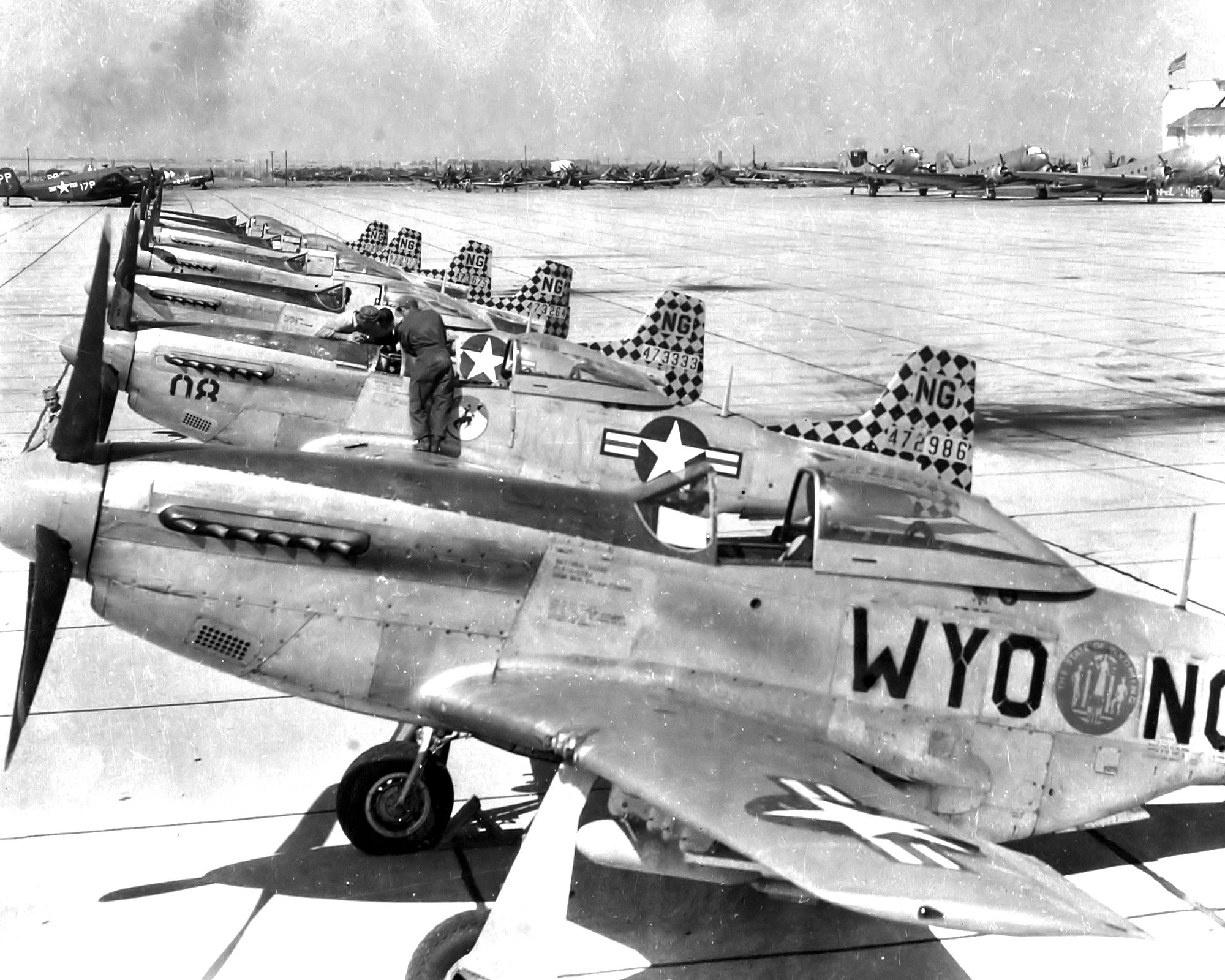
F-51D Mustangs of the 187th Fighter Squadron, 1948

On 24 May 1946, the United States Army Air Forces, in response to dramatic postwar military budget cuts imposed by President Harry S. Truman, allocated inactive unit designations to the National Guard Bureau for the formation of an Air Force National Guard. These unit designations were allotted and transferred to various State National Guard bureaus to provide them unit designations to re-establish them as Air National Guard units.

The Wyoming Air National Guard was first organized in a small hangar on the southwest side of Cheyenne Municipal Airport, Wyoming, under Maj. Robert E. Sedman. It was extended federal recognition and activated on 11 August 1946 and was equipped with F-51D Mustangs. 18 September 1947, however, is considered the Wyoming Air National Guard's official birth concurrent with the establishment of the United States Air Force as a separate branch of the United States military under the National Security Act.

The 187th Fighter Squadron was activated on 1 April 1951 for service during the Korean War, with personnel assigned to Clovis Air Force Base, New Mexico, West Germany, Okinawa, and South Korea. In Korea, 18 Wyoming ANG pilots flew 1,500 combat missions. In 1956 the Wyoming ANG became the 187th Fighter Interceptor Squadron. Two years later, during 1958, it received its first F-86L Sabre, and was re-designation as the 153rd Fighter Interceptor Group.

The most dramatic change came for the Wyoming unit in 1961 when it changed from a fighter unit to flying Fairchild C-119 Flying Boxcar and airlifting medical patients, with the newly designated 187th Aeromedical Transport Squadron. On 21 June 1963 it received the Lockheed C-121 Constellation aircraft and expanded its military airlift role to worldwide mission capabilities.

=== Vietnam War ===
During the Vietnam War, the Wyoming Air Guard flew its first mission into the Vietnam combat zone in late 1964, and continued to do so through the take over of South Vietnam by its enemies. During early 1966 the unit became the 153rd Military Airlift Group, under the Military Airlift Command.

=== Airborne fire-fighting ===
In 1972, the Wyoming Air Guard received its first C-130B Hercules aircraft, which the unit continues to fly over 30 years later. In 1975, the Wyoming Air Guard was selected for the unique role of aerial firefighting. Two Wyoming C-130s were equipped with MAFFS and began water/fire retardant bombing of fires throughout the United States. Those fire fighting missions still continue through the present.

In the meantime, the 153rd Tactical Airlift Group expanded to regularly flying missions with the United States Southern Command out of Howard Air Force Base, Panama, as part of Operation Phoenix Oak. From supplying embassies in Central and South America, to searching for sinking ships in the middle of tropical storms, the Wyoming C-130s and aircrews carried out military and humanitarian missions. Those missions continued through Operation Just Cause, the United States invasion of Panama in 1989–90.

=== Gulf War ===
During the Gulf War, the Wyoming Air Guard flew continental U.S. and Central and South America missions, beginning on 9 August 1990, the first day of Operation Desert Shield, and into Operation Desert Storm. During that time, the Wyoming 187th Aeromedical Evacuation Flight and the 153rd Clinic were both activated, with a large number of those medical personnel being sent to Saudi Arabia. After the end of hostilities, Wyoming Guard members continued with Operation Provide Comfort, which supplied humanitarian aid to Kurdish people displaced by the Iraqi military.

=== Humanitarian missions ===
During 1993 and early 1994, the 153rd Airlift Group traded its older C-130B model aircraft for new Lockheed C-130H3 models, which greatly enhanced the Wyoming ANG's worldwide flying capabilities. From July 1993 through February 1994, the 187th Aeromedical Evacuation Squadron, provided volunteer medical personnel during Operation Restore Hope in Somalia. Three of those medical personnel subsequently received commendations for saving United States Army Rangers' lives while under attack in Somalia in October 1993. During 1993–94, a number of Wyoming pilots, navigators, and loadmasters volunteered to fly missions into and over Bosnia/Serbia, while temporarily assigned Operation Provide Promise.

The years between the Gulf War and 2001 proved to be a period of continued activity for the Wyoming Air Guard. Major unit deployments included Operation Uphold Democracy in Haiti in 1995, Operation Southern Watch in Iraq in 1996 and 1998, Operation Joint Endeavour in Bosnia in 1996, Operation Shining Hope in Bosnia in 1999, Operation Joint Forge in Bosnia and Kosovo in 1999, Operation Coronet Oak in Panama in 2000, and the yearly MAFFS mission as directed.

During this same period numerous individuals volunteered for such missions as Operation Sea Signal for Haitian refugees at Guantanamo in 1995 and Operation New Hope in El Salvador in 1999.

In April 1997 the Wyoming 153rd Airlift Wing was reassigned to the Air Mobility Command, and continued its federal and state airlift, fire fighting, and humanitarian missions. From 10 November to 5 December 1997 the Wyoming Air National Guard flew 250 airborne fire-fighting missions in the jungles of Indonesia as Operation Tempest Rapid I. This was the first time U.S. airborne fire fighting had ever been done outside of the continental U.S.

=== War on terror ===
As with the rest of the U.S. military, the wing's focus changed abruptly after the September 11 attacks, 2001. Responding immediately, the 153 AW became the first unit to resume flying, by answering the call to ferry blood donations around the western United States. By the end of September virtually all of the 153rd Security Forces Squadron had been called to active duty and assigned to active Air Force bases. As a result, numerous individuals volunteered to be activated as security forces augmentees, an assignment that lasted half a year for many. Three others volunteered for temporary civilian airport security duties.

In December 2001 the expected call up for more of the unit arrived. This resulted in five aircraft, their crews, and support personnel deploying to Oman as part of Operation Enduring Freedom. During the unit's eight-month deployment, it flew 5,500 hours (including 4,000 combat hours in Afghanistan), and earned the Air Force Outstanding Unit Award with Valor. In addition, the unit's air traffic controllers served in Pakistan during this period, while numerous other members answered the call in their individual Air Force Specialty Code capacity.

As the war on terror expanded to include operations in Iraq and continued operations in Afghanistan, the 153rd Airlift Wing was repeatedly called for. In addition to its ongoing commitment to MAFFS, Operation Joint Forge in Europe, and Coronet Oak in Latin America, the 153 AW maintained a two-year-long, two-aircraft commitment to Operation Iraqi Freedom during 2004–2005. In 2000 and 2007 the unit returned to Afghanistan for two and three aircraft Aerospace Expeditionary Force rotations. In the U.S., the end of 2007 found four aircraft responding to the great Southern California wildfires.

In Cheyenne the period 2004-2007 witnessed the 153 AW receiving a remodeled dining facility, a new petroleum oils and lubricants facility, a new air operations building for Air Traffic Control and Aerial Port, and approval of a new squadrons operations building. Numerous temporary modular buildings also supported the unit.

The time period 2006-2007 also witnessed a unique combination of active duty and National Guard forces in Cheyenne. In July 2006 the 30th Airlift Squadron, an active duty unit, stood up at Cheyenne Regional Airport, under the operational direction of the 153 AW. Known as an active associate unit, the addition of the 30 AS resulted in the 153 AW receiving an additional four C-130 aircraft during 2007, and increased the wing's aircraft strength from eight to twelve aircraft.

For the years 2008-to present, the 153 AW continued to be deployed to Iraq and Afghanistan.

== See also ==
- Wyoming Wing Civil Air Patrol
