= United Air Lines Flight 34 =

1936 aircraft crash in California, US

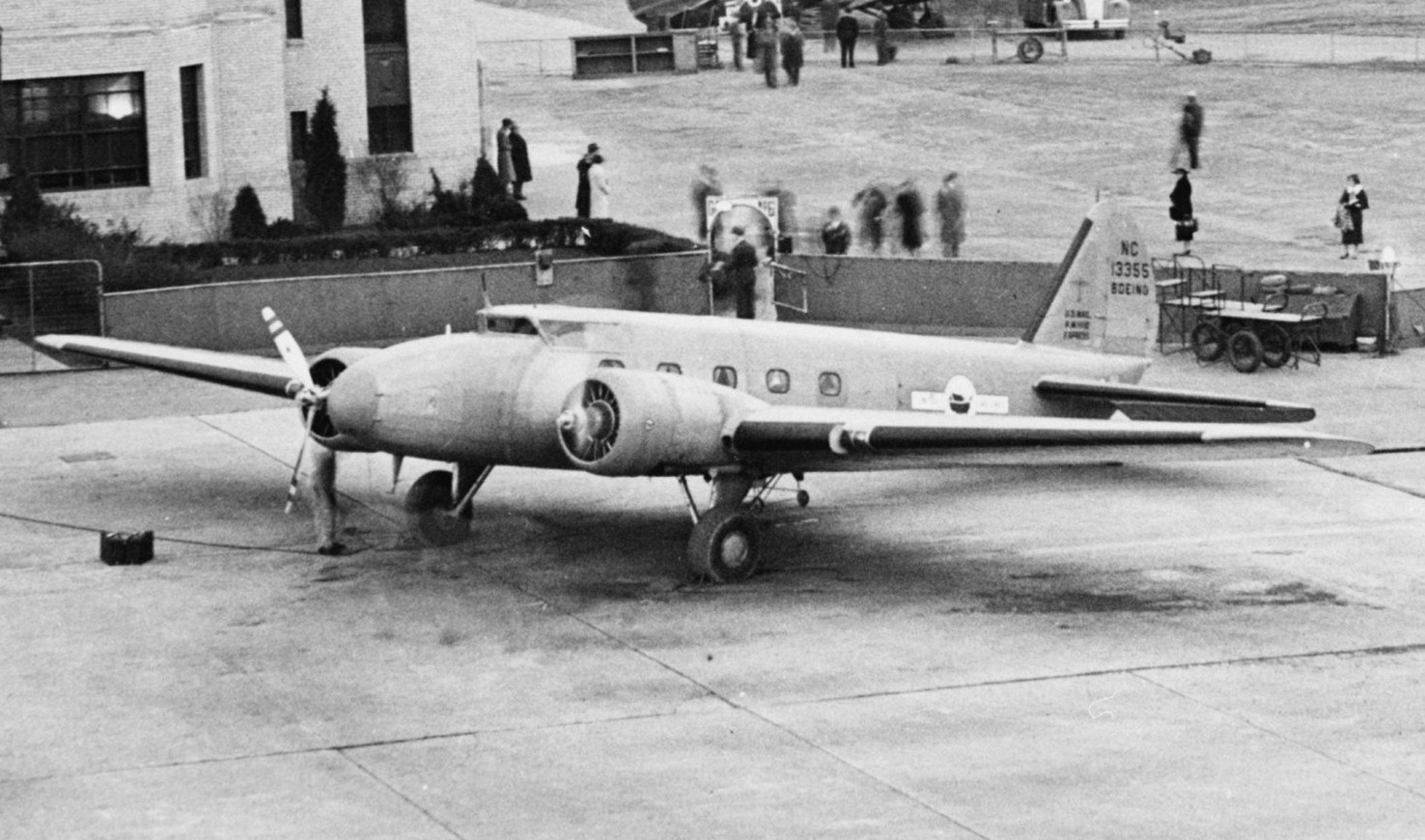
- NC13355, the aircraft involved in the accident

Accident
- Date: December 27, 1936
- Summary: Pilot error
- Site: Rice Canyon, Los Angeles County, California, United States; 34.3502769°N 118.5453639°W

Aircraft
- Aircraft type: Boeing 247D
- Operator: United Airlines
- Registration: NC13355
- Flight origin: Mills Field Municipal Airport, California, United States
- Destination: Los Angeles, California, United States
- Occupants: 12
- Passengers: 9
- Crew: 3
- Fatalities: 12
- Survivors: 0

United Air Lines Flight 34 was a scheduled flight departing from Mills Field Municipal Airport in San Francisco, California, United States, to Los Angeles, California, United States, on December 27, 1936. At 07:36 Pacific time, the co-pilot requested the UAL localizer beacon at Burbank be turned on. The company radio requested aircraft position, to which the co-pilot replied, "just a minute." The aircraft crashed at the head of Rice Canyon (near Newhall, California) at 7:38 am, killing all 12 passengers and crew. The probable cause was found to be "an error on the part of the pilot for attempting to fly through Newhall pass at an altitude lower than the surrounding mountains without first determining by radio the existing weather".
