= Tona, Santander =

Coordinates: 7°15′N 72°54′W

- Municipality and town
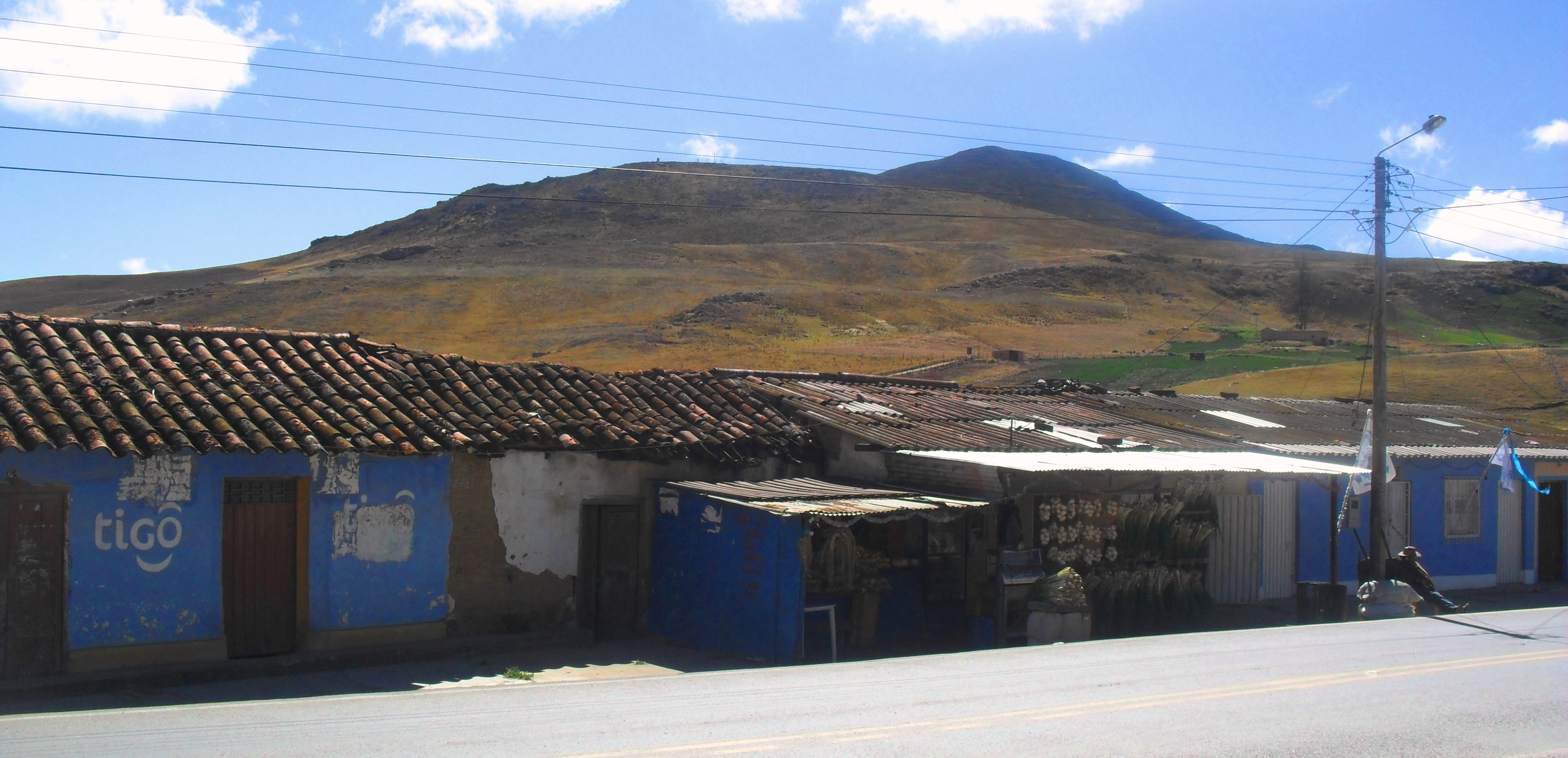

- Flag Coat of arms

- Location of the municipality and town of Tona, Santander in the Santander Department of Colombia.
- Country: Colombia
- Department: Santander Department
- Time zone: UTC-5 (Colombia Standard Time)

Tona is a town and municipality in the Santander Department in northeastern Colombia.

== Climate ==
Climate data for Tona (Berlin Automatica), elevation 3,214 m (10,545 ft), (1981–2010)
Month	Jan	Feb	Mar	Apr	May	Jun	Jul	Aug	Sep	Oct	Nov	Dec	Year
Mean daily maximum °C (°F)	14.5 (58.1)	14.7 (58.5)	14.9 (58.8)	14.3 (57.7)	13.8 (56.8)	12.9 (55.2)	12.3 (54.1)	12.8 (55.0)	13.5 (56.3)	13.5 (56.3)	13.5 (56.3)	13.9 (57.0)	13.7 (56.7)
Daily mean °C (°F)	8.5 (47.3)	8.7 (47.7)	9.0 (48.2)	9.3 (48.7)	9.2 (48.6)	8.8 (47.8)	8.4 (47.1)	8.7 (47.7)	8.9 (48.0)	9.0 (48.2)	9.0 (48.2)	8.7 (47.7)	8.8 (47.8)
Mean daily minimum °C (°F)	1.7 (35.1)	2.6 (36.7)	3.7 (38.7)	5.4 (41.7)	5.9 (42.6)	5.8 (42.4)	5.4 (41.7)	5.4 (41.7)	5.2 (41.4)	5.2 (41.4)	4.6 (40.3)	3.1 (37.6)	4.5 (40.1)
Average precipitation mm (inches)	14.0 (0.55)	23.9 (0.94)	36.4 (1.43)	81.5 (3.21)	92.3 (3.63)	59.0 (2.32)	55.7 (2.19)	68.0 (2.68)	94.1 (3.70)	99.7 (3.93)	54.0 (2.13)	19.6 (0.77)	698.2 (27.49)
Average precipitation days	6	8	11	15	18	20	21	19	17	19	13	8	175
Average relative humidity (%)	84	84	85	88	88	89	89	88	87	88	87	86	87
Mean monthly sunshine hours	223.2	180.7	161.2	114.0	108.5	105.0	124.0	133.3	132.0	127.1	147.0	198.4	1,754.4
Mean daily sunshine hours	7.2	6.4	5.2	3.8	3.5	3.5	4.0	4.3	4.4	4.1	4.9	6.4	4.8
Source: Instituto de Hidrologia Meteorologia y Estudios Ambientales
