= Wyoming Military Department =

Component of the US Army and military of the U.S. state of Wyoming

Wyoming National Guard
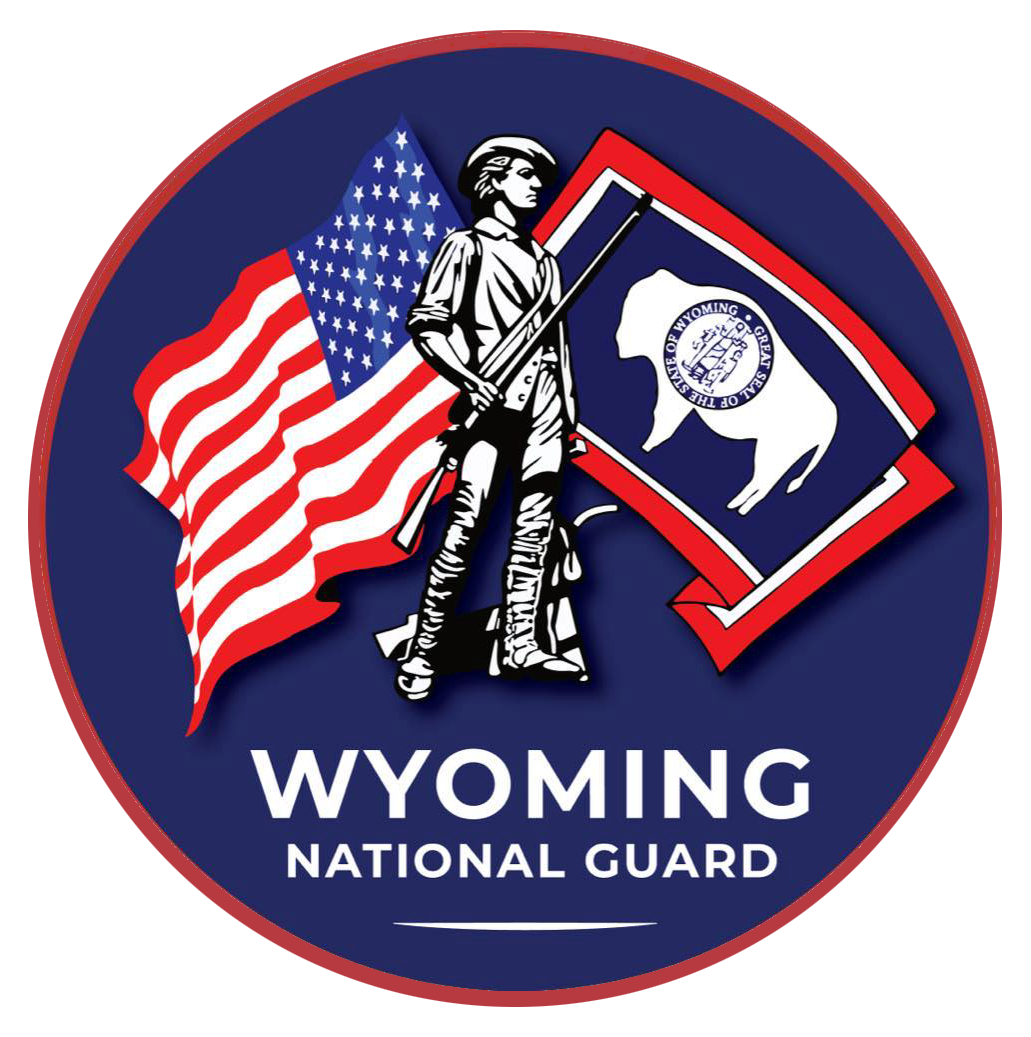
- Wyoming National Guard logo
- Active: May 1894 - present
- Country: United States
- Branch: United States National Guard
- Mottos: Always Ready, Always There

Commanders
- Current commander: Governor Mark Gordon
- Current TAG: Major General Greg Porter

Joint Forces Readiness Center
- Cheyenne, Wyoming

Site information
- Type: Headquarters
- Owner: Wyoming Military Department
- Controlled by: Wyoming Military Department
- Condition: In Service

Location
- Coordinates: 41.1690°N 104.8464°W
- Area: Interior: 145,000 sq ft (13,500 m^{2})
- Height: Two floors above ground

Site history
- Built: December 2008 – August 2010
- Built by: FCI Constructors Inc.
- In use: 2010–present

The Wyoming Military Department is part of the government of Wyoming. Its primary components are the Wyoming Army National Guard, and the Wyoming Air National Guard.

== Leadership ==
=== The Commander in Chief ===
As of June 14, 2022, the current commander in chief is Governor Mark Gordon.

=== Joint Forces ===
==== The Adjutant General ====
Major General Greg Porter is the Adjutant General for Wyoming. As such, he directs the Wyoming Military Department, located in Cheyenne. He is responsible for formulating, developing and coordinating all policies, plans and programs affecting the more than 3,000 Army and Air National Guard members in Wyoming. He is also responsible for the Wyoming Veterans’ Affairs Commission and the Oregon Trail State Veterans’ Cemetery.

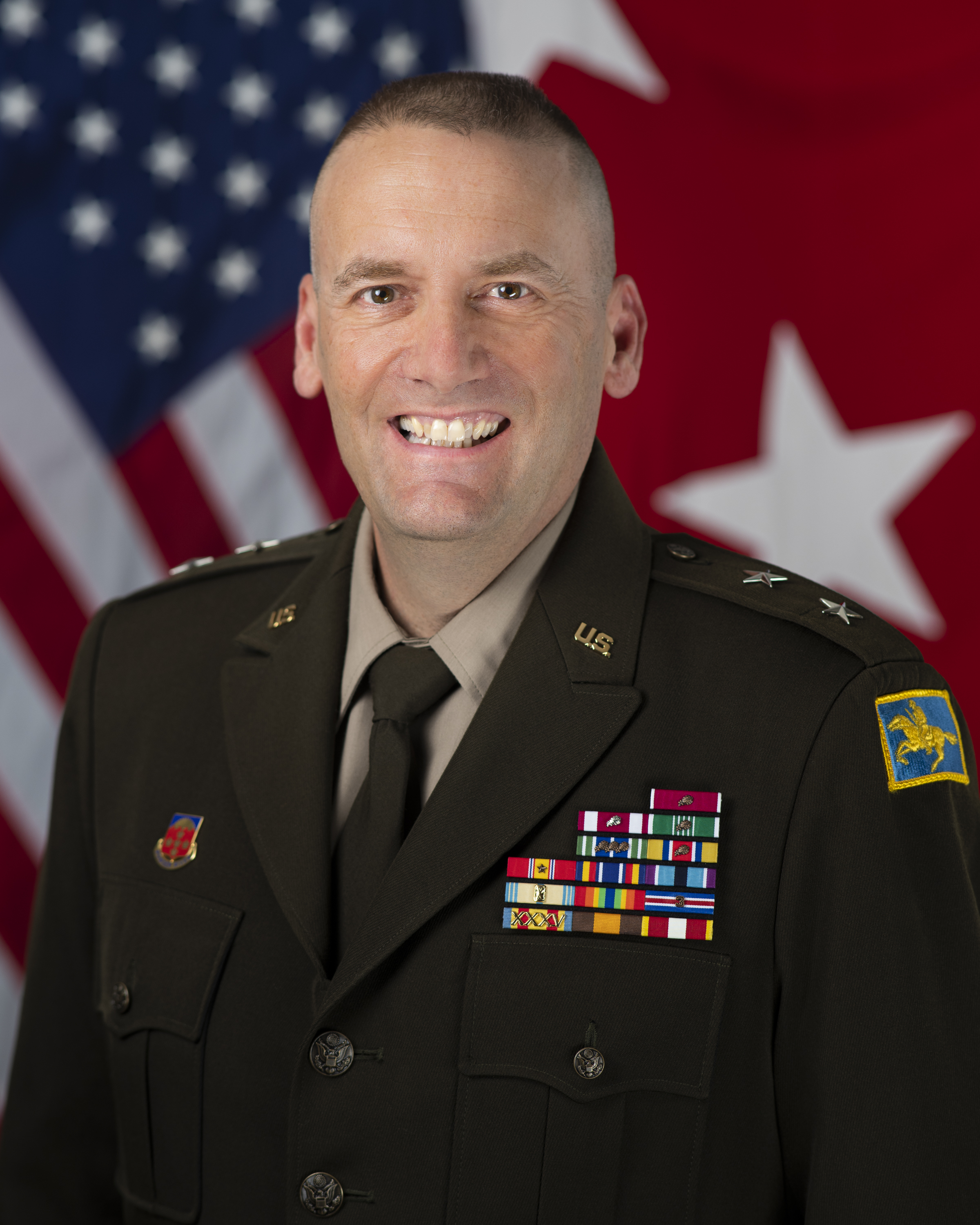
Major General Greg Porter

==== Land Component Commander ====
Brigadier General Edward Lewis is the Commander of the Wyoming Army National Guard and Assistant Adjutant General – Army headquartered in Cheyenne, Wyoming. General Lewis is responsible for unit readiness, leadership, and strategic planning to support all State and Federal mission requirements assigned to the Army Guard. The command includes units located throughout Wyoming with more than 1,700 soldiers. Units of the Wyoming Army National Guard include field artillery, engineer, maintenance, aviation, command and control, signal, medical, logistics, a training school, and an Army band. Major commands include the 115th Field Artillery Brigade, 94th Troop Command, Camp Guernsey Joint Training Center, the 213th Regiment - Regional Training Institute, and the Joint Force Headquarters.

==== Air Component Commander ====
Brigadier General Berry Diebert is the Assistant Adjutant General - Air, Wyoming and also serves as the Commander, Wyoming Air National Guard. He has overall responsibility for the organization, training, and resourcing of more than 1,300 airmen.

==== Director of the Joint Staff ====
Brigadier General Michelle Mullberry is the director of the Joint Staff for the Wyoming National Guard at the Joint Force Headquarters, in Cheyenne, Wyoming. Mullberry serves as the director of the Joint Staff and is responsible for Wyoming National Guard's response to domestic missions such as floods, wildfires, storms, etc. In addition, he coordinates and oversees all Joint Staff functions within the Wyoming National Guard and serves as the Deputy Adjutant General.

==== Chief of Staff - Air ====
LtCol Karen Hinkle is the Chief of Staff of the Wyoming Air National Guard. She serves as an advisor to the Adjutant General, supporting the programs and agendas for the Wyoming National Guard. In addition. As Chief of Staff for the Wyoming Air National Guard, she oversees the Joint Force Headquarters assigned personnel and is responsible for Wyoming Air National Guard policy and personnel action.

==== Chief of Staff - Army ====
Colonel Edward Lewis is the Chief of Staff of the Wyoming Army National Guard. He serves as an advisor to the Adjutant General, supporting the programs and agendas for the Wyoming National Guard. In addition, Col. Lewis fulfills the role of Adjutant General during periods of extended absence. As Chief of Staff for the Wyoming Army National Guard, she oversees the Joint Force Headquarters assigned personnel and is responsible for Wyoming Army National Guard policy and personnel action.

==== Command Senior Enlisted Leader ====
Chief Master Sgt. Joshua Moore is Wyoming National Guard's first Command Senior Enlisted Leader and was appointed on August 1, 2021. Moore serves as the primary adviser to the adjutant general for all enlisted matters, including Airmen and Soldiers. Moore also represents Wyoming enlisted members at the national level to the Senior Enlisted Advisor to the Chief of the National Guard Bureau.

==== Chief of the Joint Staff ====
Mr. Rob Cain is the Chief of the Joint Staff of the Wyoming National Guard at the Joint Force Headquarters in Cheyenne, Wyoming.

=== Army ===
==== U.S. Property and Fiscal Officer ====
Colonel Jason Salsgiver is the U.S. Property and Fiscal Officer at the Joint Force Headquarters, in Cheyenne, Wyoming. Salsgiver is responsible to receive and account for all funds and property of the United States government in the possession of the Wyoming National Guard. He is to ensure federal funds are obligated and expended in conformance with applicable statutes and regulations, and report on federal funds and property as directed

==== State Command Sergeant Major ====
State Command Sergeant Major Lindsay Schmidt serves as the Senior Enlisted Advisor to the Adjutant General of Wyoming, leading the Army Guard's non-commissioned officers as they support statewide commands in achieving the Adjutant General's goals and objectives. His duties also include active involvement in all care and training of the Wyoming National Guard's enlisted force.

==== State Command Chief Warrant Officer ====
Chief Warrant Officer 5 Derek Fisbeck is the State Command Chief Warrant Officer for the Wyoming National Guard at the Joint Force Headquarters, in Cheyenne, Wyoming. He serves as the Senior Warrant Officer Advisor to the adjutant general of the Wyoming National Guard on all matters pertaining to policies, programs, and actions impacting the warrant officer cohort, including professional development, promotions, assignments, incentives, morale, discipline, and strength.

=== Air ===
==== 153rd Airlift Wing Commander ====
Colonel Brian W. Diehl is the 153rd Airlift Wing Commander for the Wyoming Air National Guard in Cheyenne, Wyoming. He has overall responsibility for the organization, training, and resourcing of more than 1,200 airmen.

==== Command Chief Master Sergeant ====
Chief Master Sergeant Sarah Brewster serves as the Command Chief Master Sergeant to the Adjutant General of Wyoming. She is responsible for all affairs concerned with the enlisted personnel of the Wyoming Air National Guard. She also serves as the Senior Enlisted Leader to the Chief of the Joint Staff.
