= List of fatal accidents and incidents involving commercial aircraft in the United States =

This is a list of fatal commercial aviation accidents and incidents in or in the vicinity of the United States or its territories.

It comprises a subset of both the list of accidents and incidents involving airliners in the United States and the list of accidents and incidents involving commercial aircraft.

It does not include fatalities due to accidents and incidents solely involving private aircraft or military aircraft.

All occurrences involving commercial aircraft in the United States are investigated by the National Transportation Safety Board.

== Since 2000 ==
=== Incidents involving passenger aircraft during flight ===
Date	Fatalities	Injuries	Survivors	Flight(s) or incident	Location	State or territory	Aircraft	Summary
November 1, 2026	9	1	0	2026 Palm Beach County Learjet 60 crash	Palm Beach County	Florida	Learjet 60	Pending Investigation, sudden loss of control and impacted the ground at speeds estimated around 700mph
June 14, 2026	12	0	0	2026 Butler PAC P-750 crash	Butler	Missouri	PAC P-750 XSTOL	The skydiving flight crashed shortly after takeoff. Investigation is ongoing.
March 22, 2026	2	39	74	Air Canada Express Flight 8646	Queens, New York City	New York	Bombardier CRJ900LR	The aircraft collided with a fire truck while landing, Both pilots were killed and both occupants of the fire truck were injured. Investigation is ongoing.
April 10, 2025	6	0	0	2025 Hudson River helicopter crash	Over Hudson River, Jersey City	New Jersey	Bell 206 LongRanger IV	The sightseeing flight experienced an In-flight breakup, Investigation is ongoing.
February 6, 2025	10	0	0	Bering Air Flight 445	Over the Norton Sound, Bering Sea	Alaska	Cessna 208B Grand Caravan EX	Disappeared 10 minutes before its scheduled arrival at Nome. Search operations located the crash site the following day. Investigation is ongoing.
January 31, 2025	8	23	0	Med Jets Flight 056	Castor Gardens, Philadelphia	Pennsylvania	Learjet 55	The medevac flight crashed into a residential area shortly after takeoff killing all 6 onboard and 2 people on the ground. Investigation is ongoing.
January 29, 2025	67	0	0	2025 Potomac River mid-air collision	Over Potomac River	District of Columbia	Bombardier CRJ701ER and Blackhawk VH-60M	A PSA Airlines aircraft collided with a U.S. Army VH-60M Blackhawk Helicopter upon approach over the Potomac River. Reports are preliminary.
February 9, 2024	6	0	0	2024 Orbic Air Eurocopter EC130 crash	Near Halloran Springs	California	Eurocopter EC130B4	The chartered flight crashed after the pilot became disoriented in night time conditions. Nigerian businessmen Herbert Wigwe and Abimbola Ogunbanjo were killed.
February 9, 2024	2	4	3	Hop-A-Jet Flight 823	Interstate 75, near Naples	Florida	Bombardier Challenger 604	The chartered flight experienced a dual engine failure and the pilots subsequently attempted an emergency landing on a highway.
September 4, 2022	10	0	0	2022 Mutiny Bay DHC-3 Otter crash	Mutiny Bay near Whidbey Island	Washington	de Havilland Canada DHC-3 Otter	Carrying tourists, the seaplane nosedived and crashed after mechanical failure of the horizontal stabilizer.
March 27, 2021	5	1	1	2021 Knik Glacier helicopter crash	Knik Glacier	Alaska	Airbus AS350B3	The sightseeing flight crashed in poor weather conditions due to pilot error which was a consequence of the operators inadequate training program. Petr Kellner the founder of PPF Group was killed.
July 31, 2020	7	0	0	2020 Alaska mid-air collision	Soldotna	Alaska	de Havilland Canada DHC-2 Beaver	The chartered flight and a privately owned Piper PA-12 Super Cruiser collided in mid-air. American politician Gary Knopp was killed.
January 26, 2020	9	0	0	2020 Calabasas helicopter crash	Calabasas	California	Sikorsky S-76B	The chartered helicopter flight crashed in heavy fog, after the pilot became disoriented as he mistakenly flew through instrument meteorological conditions. Former NBA player Kobe Bryant, his daughter Gianna Bryant and baseball coach John Altobelli were killed.
October 17, 2019	1	12	41	PenAir Flight 3296	Amaknak Island	Alaska	Saab 2000	The aircraft overshot the runway during landing, killing one passenger.
May 13, 2019	6	10	10	2019 Alaska mid-air collision	George Inlet	Alaska	de Havilland Canada DHC-2 Beaver, de Havilland Canada DHC-3 Otter	Two commercial floatplanes conducting sightseeing tours collided in mid-air. All 5 aboard the DHC-2 and 1 aboard the DHC-3 were killed.
August 4, 2018	5	0	0	2018 K2 Aviation DHC-2 Beaver crash	Denali National Park	Alaska	de Havilland Canada DHC-2 Beaver	The sightseeing flight crashed into a glacier. The cause of the crash was not determined.
April 17, 2018	1	8	148	Southwest Airlines Flight 1380	near Bernville	Pennsylvania	Boeing 737-700	The aircraft experienced a uncontained engine failure with debris penetrating the fuselage; one passenger was partially ejected from the aircraft and later died of her injuries.
March 11, 2018	5	1	1	2018 New York City helicopter crash	East River, New York City	New York	Eurocopter AS350B2	The sightseeing flight experienced an engine failure. The pilot was the sole survivor.
September 8, 2017	2	0	0	2017 New Jersey helicopter crash	Medford	New Jersey	Schweizer S269C-1	The sightseeing flight crashed during landing due to both pilot error and mechanical failure. Troy Gentry part of the country music duo Montgomery Gentry was killed.
July 30, 2016	16	0	0	2016 Lockhart hot air balloon crash	Between Lockhart and Maxwell	Texas	Kubicek BB85Z	The sightseeing flight collided with power lines due to pilot error.
November 10, 2015	9	0	0	Execuflight Flight 1526	Akron	Ohio	British Aerospace BAe-125-700A	The charter flight stalled and crashed on approach due to pilot error.
May 31, 2014	7	0	0	2014 Bedford Gulfstream IV crash	Bedford	Massachusetts	Gulfstream IV	The charter flight crashed into a ravine during takeoff after the pilots forgot to disengage the aircraft's gust lock system. Businessman and philanthropist Lewis Katz was killed.
July 7, 2013	10	0	0	2013 Rediske Air DHC-3 Otter crash	Soldotna	Alaska	de Havilland Canada DHC-3 Otter	The charter flight stalled and crashed during takeoff, due to overloading and an excessively aft center of gravity.
July 6, 2013	3	187	304	Asiana Airlines Flight 214	San Francisco	California	Boeing 777-200ER	The aircraft crashed short of the runway during landing due to pilot error.
August 8, 2009	9	0	0	2009 Hudson River mid-air collision	Hudson River, Hoboken	New Jersey	Eurocopter AS350	The sightseeing flight was struck mid-air by a privately owned Piper PA-32R.
February 12, 2009	50	4	0	Colgan Air Flight 3407	Clarence Center	New York	Bombardier Dash 8 Q400	The aircraft crashed into a house during approach due to the flight crew's improper response to an impending stall, killing all 49 on board and 1 person in the house.
September 19, 2008	4	2	2	2008 South Carolina Learjet 60 crash	West Columbia	South Carolina	Learjet 60	The Aircraft overran the runway after an aborted takeoff. Musician's Travis Barker and Adam Goldstein (DJ AM) were injured.
August 5, 2008	9	4	4	2008 Carson Helicopters Sikorsky S-61 crash	Shasta-Trinity National Forest near Weaverville	California	Sikorsky S-61N	The chartered helicopter which was being used to transport firefighters crashed during takeoff due to being overloaded.
July 31, 2008	8	0	0	East Coast Jets Flight 81	Near Owatonna	Minnesota	Hawker 800	The charter flight collided with runway equipment and crashed into a field during an attempted go-around.
August 27, 2006	49	1	1	Comair Flight 5191	Lexington	Kentucky	Bombardier CRJ100ER	The aircraft mistakenly attempted to take off using an incorrect runway that was too short, causing it to overrun the runway and crash. The sole survivor was the first officer.
December 19, 2005	20	0	0	Chalk's Ocean Airways Flight 101	Government Cut channel, off of Miami Beach	Florida	Grumman G-73 Mallard	The aircraft experienced in-flight structural failure caused by metal fatigue cracking and poor maintenance and crashed, killing everyone on board.
December 8, 2005	1	12	103	Southwest Airlines Flight 1248	Chicago	Illinois	Boeing 737-700	The aircraft overran the runway at Chicago-Midway during a snowstorm because reverse thrust was not applied in a timely manner. Everyone aboard survived, but the plane crashed into a vehicle outside the airport and killed a child in the car.
October 19, 2004	13	2	2	Corporate Airlines Flight 5966	Kirksville	Missouri	British Aerospace Jetstream 32	The aircraft crashed on approach because of pilot error.
January 8, 2003	21	1	0	Air Midwest Flight 5481	Charlotte	North Carolina	Beechcraft 1900D	Overweight and with faulty maintenance to its elevator system, the plane entered an unrecoverable stall just after takeoff. All onboard were killed.
November 12, 2001	265	1	0	American Airlines Flight 587	Belle Harbor, Queens, New York City	New York	Airbus A300B4-600R	The aircraft lost its vertical stabilizer shortly after takeoff as a result of the first officer's extreme rudder inputs during wake turbulence and crashed into a neighborhood in Queens, killing all 260 on board and 5 people on the ground.
September 11, 2001	44	0	0	United Airlines Flight 93	Shanksville	Pennsylvania	Boeing 757-222	One of four aircraft involved in the September 11 attacks. After being hijacked by four Al-Qaeda terrorists with the intention of being crashed into either the United States Capitol building or the White House, passengers on board the flight partially regained control of the aircraft before crashing into a field at high speed, killing all 44 people on board including the four hijackers.
September 11, 2001	189	106	0	American Airlines Flight 77	Arlington	Virginia	Boeing 757-223	One of four aircraft involved in the September 11 attacks. After being hijacked by five Al-Qaeda terrorists it was deliberately crashed into the west wall of the Pentagon, resulting in the deaths of all 64 people on board including the five hijackers, as well as an additional 125 people in the Pentagon. 106 people on the ground suffered from injuries of varying severity.
September 11, 2001	c. 679 (2,763 total combined with American Airlines Flight 11)	c. 6,000 – c. 25,000 (combined with American Airlines Flight 11)	0	United Airlines Flight 175	New York City	New York	Boeing 767-200	One of four aircraft involved in the September 11 attacks. After being hijacked by five Al-Qaeda terrorists it was deliberately crashed into the South Tower of World Trade Center, resulting in the deaths of all 65 people on board including the five hijackers, as well as an estimated 614 people in the South Tower when it subsequently collapsed as a result of the crash. Thousands of people on the ground suffered from injuries of varying severity.
September 11, 2001	c. 1,700 (2,763 total combined with United Airlines Flight 175)	c. 6,000 – c. 25,000 (combined with United Airlines Flight 175)	0	American Airlines Flight 11	New York City	New York	Boeing 767-200ER	One of four aircraft involved in the September 11 attacks. After being hijacked by five Al-Qaeda terrorists it was deliberately crashed into the North Tower of World Trade Center, resulting in the deaths of all 92 people on board including the five hijackers, as well as an estimated 1,600 people in the North Tower when it subsequently collapsed as a result of the crash. Thousands of people on the ground suffered from injuries of varying severity.
March 29, 2001	18	0	0	2001 Avjet Gulfstream III crash	Near Aspen	Colorado	Gulfstream III	The charter flight crashed after the pilots attempted an illegal approach whilst under pressure from a passenger.
January 27, 2001	10	0	0	Oklahoma State Cowboys basketball team plane crash	Near Strasburg	Colorado	Beechcraft Super King Air 200	The aircraft operating the chartered flight broke up and crashed after the pilot became disoriented following a loss of electrical power in poor meteorological conditions.
August 11, 2000	1	1	125	Southwest Airlines Flight 1763	in flight toward Salt Lake City	Utah	Boeing 737-700	In an apparent case of air rage, a man opened the cockpit door and was then subdued by eight others and died of asphyxiation as a result.
May 21, 2000	19	0	0	2000 East Coast Aviation Services British Aerospace Jetstream crash	Wilkes-Barre	Pennsylvania	British Aerospace Jetstream 31	The charter flight crashed during landing after running out of fuel due to pilot error.
January 31, 2000	88	0	0	Alaska Airlines Flight 261	Pacific Ocean, near Anacapa Island	California	McDonnell Douglas MD-83	The aircraft lost pitch control when an inadequately lubricated jackscrew tore loose, causing it to crash into the ocean while preparing for an emergency landing.

=== Incidents involving cargo aircraft during flight ===
Date	Fatalities	Injuries	Survivors	Flight(s) or incident	Location	State or territory	Aircraft	Summary
September 6, 2026	5	5	2	21 Air Flight 7598	Miami	Florida	Boeing 767-33AER(BDSF)	The cargo aircraft overran the runway during landing, striking at least two vehicles outside the airport and causing 5 ground fatalities and several injuries. Investigation is ongoing.
November 4, 2025	15	22	0	UPS Airlines Flight 2976	Louisville	Kentucky	McDonnell Douglas MD-11F	The cargo aircraft crashed shortly after takeoff following a separation of the No.1 engine, all 3 crew members and 12 people on the ground were killed. Investigation is ongoing.
April 23, 2024	2	0	0	2024 Alaska Air Fuel Douglas C-54 crash	Near Tanana River, Fairbanks	Alaska	Douglas C-54D	The cargo aircraft experienced an engine failure resulting in an explosion and subsequent loss of control.
February 23, 2019	3	0	0	Atlas Air Flight 3591	Trinity Bay, near Anahuac	Texas	Boeing 767-300ER	The cargo aircraft crashed during final approach.
August 14, 2013	2	0	0	UPS Airlines Flight 1354	Birmingham	Alabama	Airbus A300F4-600R	The cargo aircraft crashed short of the runway during landing due to fatigue and pilot error.
March 8, 2013	2	0	0	ACE Air Cargo Flight 51	Muklung Hills, 17 miles NE of Dillingham	Alaska	Beachcraft 1900C	The cargo aircraft crashed into a mountain during approach because of pilot error.
August 13, 2004	1	1	1	Air Tahoma Flight 185	Florence	Kentucky	Convair CV-580	Mismanagement of fuel tanks caused a dual-engine flameout, and the cargo aircraft then crashed during approach, killing the first officer.
February 16, 2000	3	0	0	Emery Worldwide Flight 17	Rancho Cordova	California	McDonnell Douglas DC-8-71	The cargo aircraft crashed shortly after takeoff after the right elevator control tab detached because of faulty maintenance, causing loss of pitch control.

=== Other incidents ===
==== During flight ====
Date	Fatalities	Injuries	Survivors	Flight(s) or incident	Location	State or territory	Aircraft	Summary
August 10, 2018	1	0	0	2018 Horizon Air Q400 incident	Ketron Island	Washington	Bombardier Dash 8 Q400	A Horizon Air employee stole an aircraft and died by suicide by intentionally crashing it over an hour later.
May 15, 2017	2	0	0	2017 Teterboro Learjet crash	Teterboro	New Jersey	Learjet 35A	The ferry flight crashed while landing after the pilots attempted to salvage an unsalvageable approach.
October 30, 2014	4	6	0	2014 Wichita King Air crash	Wichita	Kansas	Beechcraft King Air B200	The ferry flight crashed into a building shortly after takeoff after the pilot's improper response to an apparent engine failure. The pilot – the aircraft's sole occupant – and three people on the ground were killed.
November 19, 2013	4	0	0	2013 Florida Learjet 35A crash	Atlantic Ocean near Fort Lauderdale	Florida	Learjet 35A	The ferry flight crashed shortly after takeoff following the pilots improper response to a thrust reverser deploying in flight.
December 10, 2006	3	0	0	2006 Mercy Air Bell 412 crash	Cajon Pass near Oak Hills	California	Bell 412SP	The ferry flight crashed after the pilot inadvertently entered poor meteorological conditions.
October 14, 2004	2	0	0	Pinnacle Airlines Flight 3701	near Jefferson City	Missouri	Bombardier CRJ200	The ferry flight suffered dual-engine failure at high altitude and a subsequent crash caused by the crew's reckless flying.
August 26, 2003	2	0	0	Colgan Air Flight 9446	Yarmouth	Massachusetts	Beechcraft 1900D	Because the crew did not perform a preflight checklist, faulty maintenance on the trim system was not detected and the ferry flight crashed shortly after takeoff.
July 18, 2002	2	0	0	2002 Estes Park PB4Y-2 crash	Near Estes Park	Colorado	Consolidated PB4Y-2 Super Privateer	The chartered aerial firefighting aircraft crashed after its left wing separated due to metal fatigue.
June 17, 2002	3	0	0	2002 Walker C-130A crash	Near Walker	California	Lockheed C-130A Hercules	The chartered aerial firefighting aircraft crashed after both its wings separated due to metal fatigue.

==== On the ground ====
Date	Fatalities	Injuries	Survivors	Flight(s) or incident	Location	State or territory	Aircraft	Summary
February 10, 2025	1	3	3	Scottsdale Touchdown Incident	Scottsdale Airport	Arizona	Learjet 35	A Learjet 35A aircraft belonging to Mötley Crüe frontman Vince Neil was arriving from Austin, Texas, when it veered off the runway and crashed into a parked Gulfstream G200 jet. The National Transportation Safety Board is currently investigating.
January 1, 2024	1	0	0	2024 Salt Lake City passenger death incident	Salt Lake City	Utah	Airbus A220-100	A passenger entered the airport grounds unauthorized from the terminal and climbed inside the engine of Delta Air Lines Flight 2348, which was being de-iced prior to departure.
June 23, 2023	1	0	0	2023 San Antonio ground crew suicide incident	San Antonio	Texas	Airbus A319	A ground crewman was ingested into an engine of the aircraft operating Delta Air Lines Flight 1111.
December 31, 2022	1	0	0	2022 Montgomery ground crew incident	Montgomery	Alabama	Embraer 175	An airline worker was pulled into the engine of the parked aircraft and killed.
May 7, 2020	1	0	58	Southwest Airlines Flight 1392	Austin	Texas	Boeing 737-700	A man who had illegally entered the airfield was struck by the plane as it was landing.

== Before 2000 ==
Date	Fatalities	Injuries	Survivors	Flight(s) or incident	Location	State or territory	Aircraft	Summary
October 31, 1999	217	0	0	EgyptAir Flight 990	Atlantic Ocean, 62 miles south of Nantucket	Massachusetts	Boeing 767-300ER	The aircraft crashed into the ocean because of deliberate flight-control inputs by the relief first officer Gameel Al-Batouti, though Egyptian authorities maintain that there was an underlying mechanical cause.
October 25, 1999	6	0	0	1999 South Dakota Learjet 35 crash	Mina	South Dakota	Learjet 35	The aircraft strayed off course and ran out of fuel after the pilots became incapacitated following a loss of cabin pressure. Professional golfer Payne Stewart and architect Bruce Borland were killed.
June 1, 1999	11	110	134	American Airlines Flight 1420	Little Rock	Arkansas	McDonnell Douglas MD-82	After the crew opted not to divert to another airport in inclement weather, the aircraft overran the runway when the spoilers were not deployed upon landing.
August 7, 1997	5	2	0	Fine Air Flight 101	Miami	Florida	McDonnell Douglas DC-8-61F	Improperly loaded cargo resulted in faulty stabilizer trim settings that caused the aircraft to pitch over uncontrollably, stall and crash just after takeoff. All 4 onboard and 1 person on the ground were killed.
August 6, 1997	229	25	25	Korean Air Flight 801	Bijia Peak, Asan-Maina, near Antonio B. Won Pat International Airport	Guam	Boeing 747-3B5	The aircraft experienced a controlled flight into terrain due to pilot error, air traffic control error, and inclement weather. The ATC Minimum Safe Altitude Warning (MSAW) system was deliberately modified so as to limit spurious alarms and could not detect an approaching aircraft that was below minimum safe altitude.
January 9, 1997	29	0	0	Comair Flight 3272	Raisinville Township	Michigan	Embraer EMB 120RT Brasilia	The crew's decision to not activate the deicing boots because of their unwarranted fear of ice bridging caused the aircraft to crash.
December 24, 1996	2	0	0	1996 New Hampshire Learjet 35 crash	Dorchester	New Hampshire	Learjet 35A	The aircraft which was on a repositioning flight collided with terrain due to pilot error. The crash site was not located until almost 3 years after the accident.
December 22, 1996	6	0	0	Airborne Express Flight 827	Near Narrows	Virginia	Douglas DC-8-63F	The aircraft stalled and crashed during a test flight due to ice accumulation and improper control inputs made by the pilots.
November 19, 1996	14	0	0	United Express Flight 5925	Gilmer Township	Illinois	Beechcraft 1900C	The aircraft collided with a private aircraft on the runway, killing all aboard both aircraft.
July 17, 1996	230	0	0	TWA Flight 800	New York Bight near East Moriches	New York	Boeing 747-100	The plane's center fuel tank exploded because of a short circuit, destroying the aircraft in midair shortly after takeoff.
July 6, 1996	2	5	140	Delta Air Lines Flight 1288	Pensacola	Florida	McDonnell Douglas MD-88	The aircraft experienced an uncontained engine failure during takeoff, with debris penetrating the fuselage and killing two passengers.
May 11, 1996	110	0	0	ValuJet Flight 592	Everglades	Florida	McDonnell Douglas DC-9-32	Expired oxygen generators caused a rapidly spreading fire that caused the crew to lose control, crashing into the Everglades.
August 21, 1995	9	20	20	Atlantic Southeast Airlines Flight 529	near Carrollton	Georgia	Embraer EMB 120RT Brasilia	The aircraft suffered failure of one of the propeller blades, causing failure of the engine and loss of lift on that side that prevented the plane from maintaining altitude. All occupants survived the initial crash, but 9 died in the ensuing fire.
February 16, 1995	3	0	0	Air Transport International Flight 782	Kansas City	Missouri	McDonnell Douglas DC-8-63F	The ferry flight crashed during takeoff after the pilots lost control of the aircraft which only had 3 of its 4 engines in operable condition.
December 13, 1994	15	5	5	Flagship Airlines Flight 3379	Morrisville	North Carolina	Jetstream 32	During approach, the captain incorrectly determined an engine had failed and then improperly attempted a single-engine go-around leading to a stall and crash.
November 22, 1994	2	8	140	TWA Flight 427	Bridgeton	Missouri	McDonnell Douglas MD-82	The aircraft struck a Cessna 441 Conquest II during its takeoff roll, killing both occupants in the Cessna but causing only minor injuries aboard the larger aircraft. The Cessna was taxiing on the incorrect runway.
October 31, 1994	68	0	0	American Eagle Flight 4184	near Roselawn	Indiana	ATR 72-200	The aircraft experienced severe icing from freezing rain that overwhelmed the deicing systems of the aircraft and caused roll excursions, the second of which was unrecoverable due to insufficient remaining altitude.
September 8, 1994	132	0	0	USAir Flight 427	Hopewell Township	Pennsylvania	Boeing 737-300	The aircraft experienced a rudder hardover during approach that was found to be due to a design flaw, causing an unrecoverable aerodynamic stall.
July 2, 1994	37	20	20	USAir Flight 1016	near Charlotte	North Carolina	McDonnell Douglas DC-9-31	The aircraft experienced windshear during landing due to a microburst and failed to successfully execute an aborted landing to recover from it.
January 7, 1994	5	3	3	United Express Flight 6291	Gahanaa	Ohio	British Aerospace Jetstream 41	The aircraft entered an aerodynamic stall during a poorly executed approach from which the pilots were unable to recover.
December 1, 1993	18	0	0	Northwest Airlink Flight 5719	east of Hibbing	Minnesota	British Aerospace Jetstream 31	The aircraft crashed into terrain during approach due to failure of the crew to maintain spatial and altitude awareness.
June 8, 1992	3	3	3	GP Express Airlines Flight 861	near Anniston	Alabama	Beechcraft Model 99	The crew attempted an approach and lost situational awareness, crashing into a hill.
June 7, 1992	5	0	0	American Eagle Flight 5456	Mayaguez	Puerto Rico	CASA C-212 Aviocar	The aircraft crashed while landing due to an inadvertent deployment of reverse thrust in flight.
March 22, 1992	27	21	24	USAir Flight 405	Flushing Bay, near Queens, New York City	New York	Fokker F28-4000 Fellowship	The aircraft did not generate sufficient lift during takeoff due to excessive ice buildup on the wings and crashed just beyond the runway. Delays during taxiing caused too much time to elapse since deicing. Actor Richard Lawson was among the survivors.
February 15, 1992	4	13	0	Air Transport International Flight 805	Swanton	Ohio	Douglas DC-8-63F	The aircraft crashed after the pilot became disoriented while performing a go-around all on board were killed.
January 3, 1992	2	2	2	CommutAir Flight 4281	near Gabriels	New York	Beechcraft 1900C	The aircraft descended below glideslope during approach and crashed due to pilot error.
September 11, 1991	14	0	0	Continental Express Flight 2574	near Eagle Lake	Texas	Embraer EMB 120 Brasilia	The aircraft suffered loss the leading edge of the left horizontal stabilizer while descending due to a critical mistake made during maintenance, causing an unrecoverable dive.
July 10, 1991	13	6	2	L'Express Airlines Flight 508	Birmingham	Alabama	Beechcraft C99	The aircraft suffered loss of control during a landing approach during severe thunderstorm activity. Blame was placed on the crew for continuing the approach under such conditions.
April 5, 1991	23	0	0	Atlantic Southeast Airlines Flight 2311	Brunswick	Georgia	Embraer EMB 120 Brasilia	The aircraft experienced a loss of control due to a malfunction of the left engine propeller control unit, which was attributed to a design flaw.
March 3, 1991	25	1	0	United Airlines Flight 585	Colorado Springs	Colorado	Boeing 737-200	The aircraft experienced a loss of control during approach due to a rudder hardover caused by a design flaw, all on board were killed. The cause was not determined until after investigation of a similar later incident, USAir Flight 427.
February 17, 1991	2	0	0	Ryan International Airlines Flight 590	Cleveland	Ohio	McDonnell DC-9-15RC	The aircraft crashed shortly after takeoff due to ice accumulation and pilot error.
February 1, 1991	35	29	66	1991 Los Angeles airport runway collision	Los Angeles	California	Boeing 737-300, Fairchild Swearingen Metroliner	USAir Flight 1493 crashed during landing into SkyWest Flight 5569, which had mistakenly been given approval by air traffic control to hold for takeoff on the same runway. All 12 aboard the SkyWest flight, as well as 23 aboard the USAir flight, perish.
December 3, 1990	8	10	190	1990 Wayne County Airport runway collision	Romulus	Michigan	McDonnell Douglas DC-9-14, Boeing 727-200 Advanced	Northwest Airlines Flight 1482 mistakenly entered an active runway during intense fog and was struck by Northwest Airlines Flight 299 during its landing. Eight aboard Flight 1482 were killed.
August 27, 1990	5	0	0	Death of Stevie Ray Vaughan	Near East Troy	Wisconsin	Bell 206B JetRanger	The chartered helicopter collided with terrain in poor visibility.
April 9, 1990	2	0	7	Atlantic Southeast Airlines Flight 2254	Gadsden	Alabama	Embraer EMB 120RT Brasilia	The aircraft experienced a mid-air collision with a Cessna 172 operated by the Civil Air Patrol killing both of its occupants, while there were no injuries aboard the commercial flight and it made a successful landing in spite of loss of its right horizontal stabilizer.
February 10, 1990	1	6+	4	1990 East River helicopter crash	East River, New York City	New York	Bell 206-L Jetranger	The sightseeing flight crashed shortly after takeoff due to pilot error and adverse weather.
January 25, 1990	73	85	85	Avianca Flight 52	Cove Neck	New York	Boeing 707-320B	The aircraft crashed while attempting to land in poor weather due to fuel exhaustion. The crew was blamed for failure to properly declare a fuel emergency.
December 26, 1989	6	0	0	United Express Flight 2415	Pasco	Washington	British Aerospace Jetstream 31	The aircraft crashed during approach, likely due to ice buildup on the control surfaces combined with the low speed and high descent angle of the approach.
October 28, 1989	20	0	0	Aloha IslandAir Flight 1712	Molokai	Hawaii	de Havilland Canada DHC-6-300 Twin Otter	The aircraft crashed into a mountain after the pilots entered instrument flight conditions whilst flying under visual flight rules.
September 20, 1989	2	21	61	USAir Flight 5050	Bowery Bay, Queens, New York City	New York	Boeing 737-400	The aircraft attempted to abort a takeoff after a tire blowout caused by improper use of the nosewheel tiller to correct a mistrimmed rudder, but overshot the runway and crashed into Bowery Bay.
July 19, 1989	112	171	184	United Airlines Flight 232	Sioux City	Iowa	McDonnell Douglas DC-10-10	The aircraft crash landed on the runway during an emergency landing after suffering an uncontained engine failure attributed to defective titanium alloy used in its construction, leading to substantial loss of hydraulics and flight controls. The crew was commended for executing excellent crew resource management, which reduced the severity of the crash and mitigated the extent of the fatalities. Among those killed were CBA commissioner Jay Ramsdell and chemist John Kenneth Stille. Among those who survived were captain Al Haynes, invest fund manager Helen Young Hayes, sportscaster Jerry Schemmel, race horse trainer and olympian Michael R. Matz, writer Spencer Bailey and musician Pete Wernick.
March 18, 1989	2	0	0	Evergreen International Airlines Flight 17	Saginaw	Texas	McDonnell DC-9-33F	The aircraft crashed shortly after takeoff when one of its cargo doors opened during the flight.
January 24, 1989	9	38	346	United Airlines Flight 811	Pacific Ocean near Honolulu	Hawaii	Boeing 747-100	The aircraft experienced explosive decompression when a cargo door opened unexpectedly midflight, which was eventually attributed to flaws in the door's design, causing some seats to be expelled from the aircraft. The flight was able to make an emergency landing in Honolulu.
August 31, 1988	14	76	94	Delta Air Lines Flight 1141	Euless	Texas	Boeing 727-200 Advanced	The aircraft crashed during takeoff due to improper takeoff configuration. Contributing to the accident was failure of the aircraft's take-off warning system.
April 28, 1988	1	65	94	Aloha Airlines Flight 243	Kahului	Hawaii	Boeing 737-200	The aircraft experienced an explosive decompression due to metal fatigue and failure of maintenance procedures to detect it. A flight attendant, Clarabelle Lansing, was ejected from the aircraft and her body was never recovered.
February 19, 1988	12	0	0	AVAir Flight 3378	Cary	North Carolina	Fairchild Swearingen Metroliner	The aircraft crashed shortly after takeoff due to an excessive rate of turn on the part of the crew during the climb.
January 19, 1988	9	7	8	Trans-Colorado Airlines Flight 2286	Bayfield	Colorado	Fairchild Metro III	The aircraft crashed during approach due to descent below the approach profile during a rapid descent.
December 7, 1987	43	0	0	Pacific Southwest Airlines Flight 1771	near Cayucos	California	British Aerospace 146	The aircraft was hijacked and deliberately crashed.
November 23, 1987	18	3	3	Ryan Air Services Flight 103	Homer	Alaska	Beechcraft 1900C	The aircraft crashed while landing due to being overloaded.
November 15, 1987	28	28	54	Continental Airlines Flight 1713	Denver	Colorado	McDonnell Douglas DC-9-14	The aircraft crashed during takeoff due to ice buildup and over-rotation by the first officer. The excessive icing was caused by miscommunication with air traffic control on the part of the crew and ensuing delays after deicing, and the decision to not undergo deicing a second time.
August 16, 1987	156	6	1	Northwest Airlines Flight 255	Detroit	Michigan	McDonnell Douglas MD-82	The aircraft crashed shortly after takeoff due to failure of the crew to properly configure the aircraft for takeoff; contributing to the accident was lack of power to the takeoff warning system. Among those killed was NBA Player Nick Vanos.
May 8, 1987	2	4	4	American Eagle Flight 5452	Mayagüez	Puerto Rico	CASA C-212 Aviocar	The aircraft crashed during approach likely due to loss of thrust from one of the engines attributed to poor maintenance. Contributing to the accident was the pilot flying an unstabilized approach.
April 13, 1987	4	0	0	Buffalo Airways Flight 721	Near Kansas City	Missouri	Boeing 707-351C	The aircraft crashed on approach due to pilot error and a failure of the ground proximity warning system.
March 4, 1987	9	13	10	Northwest Airlink Flight 2268	Romulus	Michigan	CASA C-212 Aviocar	The aircraft crashed during approach due to the pilot flying an unstabilized approach, specifically the captain's use of the beta propeller mode which caused asymmetric power at low speed.
January 15, 1987	10	0	0	SkyWest Airlines Flight 1834	Kearns	Utah	Swearingen SA226-TC Metro II	The flight was involved in a mid-air collision with a privately owned Mooney M-20 after it entered restricted airspace. Primary blame was placed upon air traffic control for not preventing the collision.
August 31, 1986	82	8	0	Aeroméxico Flight 498	Cerritos	California	McDonnell Douglas DC-9-32	The flight experienced a mid-air collision with a Piper PA-28-181 Archer private aircraft after it entered restricted airspace. Equal blame was placed upon air traffic control and the pilot of the Piper for not preventing the collision. All 67 occupants of both aircraft and 15 people on the ground were killed.
June 18, 1986	25	0	0	1986 Grand Canyon mid-air collision	Grand Canyon National Park	Arizona	de Havilland Canada DHC-6 Twin Otter, Bell 206	The sightseeing flights were involved in a mid-air collision over the Grand Canyon.
September 23, 1985	14	0	0	Henson Airlines Flight 1517	Grottoes	Virginia	Beechcraft Model 99	The aircraft crashed during approach due to navigational errors made by the crew and failure to adequately monitor their instruments.
September 6, 1985	31	0	0	Midwest Express Airlines Flight 105	Milwaukee	Wisconsin	McDonnell Douglas DC-9-14	The aircraft suffered an uncontained engine failure shortly after takeoff and then crashed due to inappropriate response by the crew to the loss of thrust.
August 25, 1985	8	0	0	Bar Harbor Airlines Flight 1808	Auburn	Maine	Beechcraft Model 99	The aircraft crashed during approach due to the pilot flying an unstabilized approach; contributing to the mishap was poor assistance from air traffic control.
August 2, 1985	137	28	27	Delta Air Lines Flight 191	Irving	Texas	Lockheed L-1011 TriStar	The aircraft experienced a microburst during approach and crashed, striking a car and killing most passengers in the process, as well as the occupant in the car. Among those killed was computer scientist Philip Don Estridge.
January 21, 1985	70	1	1	Galaxy Airlines Flight 203	Reno	Nevada	Lockheed L-188 Electra	The aircraft crashed shortly after takeoff due to the crew's inability to maintain control of the aircraft during an emergency landing precipitated by vibrations caused by an open air start access door left open by the ground crew.
December 6, 1984	13	0	0	Provincetown-Boston Airlines Flight 1039	Jacksonville	Florida	Embraer EMB-110 Bandeirante	The aircraft was thought to have experienced a malfunction of either its elevator control or trim systems, leading to detachment of the horizontal stabilizer due to overstress caused by the crew's attempts to correct the loss of pitch control.
August 24, 1984	17	0	0	1984 San Luis Obispo mid-air collision	Near San Luis Obispo	California	Beechcraft C-99 Commuter	The aircraft was involved in a mid-air collision with a Rockwell Commander 112.
August 2, 1984	9	0	0	Vieques Air Link Flight 901A	Vieques	Puerto Rico	Britten-Norman Islander	The aircraft crashed due to contaminated fuel resulting in a failure of the No.1 engine, The aircraft had also been overloaded.
December 20, 1983	1	2	86	Ozark Air Lines Flight 650	Sioux Falls	South Dakota	McDonnell Douglas DC-9-31	The aircraft collided with a runway snowplow during landing, killing its driver, 2 people on board the plane were injured.
October 11, 1983	10	0	0	Air Illinois Flight 710	near Pinckneyville	Illinois	Hawker Siddeley HS 748	The aircraft experienced complete loss of electrical power shortly after takeoff and eventually crashed into terrain while trying to navigate in the dark without instrumentation; the captain was blamed for attempting to continue to the flight's destination rather than executing an emergency landing at the departure airport.
June 2, 1983	23	16	23	Air Canada Flight 797	Hebron	Kentucky	McDonnell Douglas DC-9-32	A fire developed in an aft lavatory, eventually filling the plane with smoke and destroying some electrical cables. The plane made a successful emergency landing, but during evacuation a flashover occurred that caused the death of half the original occupants. Among those killed was musician Stan Rogers
January 11, 1983	3	0	0	United Airlines Flight 2885	Romulus	Michigan	Douglas DC-8-54F	The aircraft crashed shortly after takeoff due to an excessive stabilizer trim setting; contributing to the accident was the captain's decision to allow the flight engineer to perform the takeoff.
August 11, 1982	1	16	273	Pan Am Flight 830	Pacific Ocean, inbound to Honolulu	Hawaii	Boeing 747-100	A bomb exploded underneath a passenger's seat. The passenger died, but the plane landed safely in Honolulu.
July 23, 1982	3	6	6	Twilight Zone accident	Valencia	California	Bell UH-1 Iroquois	The chartered helicopter crashed during the production of Twilight Zone: The Movie after its tail rotor was destroyed by a pyrotechnic. Actor Vic Morrow along with two child actors Myca Dinh Le and Renee Shin-Ye Chen were killed.
July 9, 1982	153	4	0	Pan Am Flight 759	Kenner	Louisiana	Boeing 727-200	The aircraft experienced a microburst shortly after takeoff, causing a rapid, unrecoverable descent. All 145 on board and 8 on the ground were killed.
February 21, 1982	1	11	11	Pilgrim Airlines Flight 458	Scituate	Rhode Island	de Havilland Canada DHC-6-100 Twin Otter	The aircraft was forced to make an emergency landing on a frozen reservoir due to an in-flight fire.
January 23, 1982	2	39	210	World Airways Flight 30	Boston	Massachusetts	McDonnell Douglas DC-10-30CF	The aircraft touched down far past the displaced threshold, leaving the aircraft insufficient runway to stop due to severe icing, and came to a stop in Boston Harbor. 2 passengers were never found and are presumed to have drowned.
January 13, 1982	78	9	5	Air Florida Flight 90	Potomac River, Washington, D.C.	District of Columbia	Boeing 737-200	The aircraft experienced severe icing while taxiing and stalled immediately after takeoff, crashing into the 14th Street Bridge, killing 4 on the bridge and all but 5 aboard the aircraft. Primary blame was placed on the crew's improper responses to the icing conditions. One of the deceased Arland D. Williams Jr. who survived the initial impact assisted in rescuing the other survivors.
June 20, 1980	13	2	2	Air Wisconsin Flight 965	near Valley	Nebraska	Swearingen SA226-TC Metro II	The aircraft suffered a dual-engine flameout due to high levels of water ingestion from severe precipitation, leading to a loss of control.
October 8, 1979	8	0	0	Comair Flight 444	Boone County	Kentucky	Piper PA-31-350 Navajo Chieftain	The charter flight which was overloaded crashed shortly after takeoff after an engine failed.
June 17, 1979	1	4 or 5	9	Air New England Flight 248	Yarmouth	Massachusetts	de Havilland Canada DHC-6 Twin Otter 300	The aircraft crashed during approach, killing only the pilot.
May 30, 1979	17	1	1	Downeast Airlines Flight 46	Rockland	Maine	de Havilland Canada DHC-6 Twin Otter Series 200	The aircraft crashed after descending below glideslope during approach in poor visibility.
May 25, 1979	273	2	0	American Airlines Flight 191	Des Plaines	Illinois	McDonnell Douglas DC-10-10	The left engine separated from the aircraft during takeoff due to improper maintenance, damaging the left wing and causing its leading-edge slats to retract, leading to an unrecoverable asymmetric aerodynamic stall. All 271 on board and 2 people on the ground were killed. It remains the deadliest commercial aircraft accident in the United States, and the second-deadliest incident involving commercial aircraft in the United States, after the 9/11 attacks.
December 28, 1978	10	24	179	United Airlines Flight 173	Portland	Oregon	McDonnell Douglas DC-8-61	The aircraft crashed due to fuel exhaustion caused by the crew's failure to adequately monitor its fuel while trying to troubleshoot issues with its landing gear, itself attributed to poor maintenance.
December 4, 1978	2	20	20	Rocky Mountain Airways Flight 217	Buffalo Pass	Colorado	de Havilland Canada DHC-6 Twin Otter 300	Aircraft entered severe icing conditions and downdrafts associated with a mountain wave. Lost control and impacted terrain where survivors were rescued the next day.
September 25, 1978	144	9	0	Pacific Southwest Airlines Flight 182	San Diego	California	Boeing 727-200, Cessna 172	The Boeing 727 experienced a mid-air collision with a private aircraft during approach due to their failure to strictly adhere to air traffic control procedures, killing all 144 aboard both aircraft as well as 7 on the ground.
May 8, 1978	3	11	55	National Airlines Flight 193	Escambia Bay, near Pensacola	Florida	Boeing 727-200	The crew attempted a non-precision approach in poor visibility, improperly responded to a ground proximity alarm, and the aircraft landed in the water short of the runway.
March 1, 1978	4	29	196	Continental Airlines Flight 603	Los Angeles	California	McDonnell Douglas DC-10-10	The aircraft suffered a tire blowout and then overran the runway during the aborted takeoff attempt.
December 19, 1977	5	Unknown	5	1977 Vieques Air Link crash	Vieques	Puerto Rico	Britten-Norman Islander	The aircraft was ditched after running out of fuel due to pilot error.
December 18, 1977	3	0	0	United Airlines Flight 2860	near Fruit Heights	Utah	Douglas DC-8F-54	The cargo flight experienced electrical issues including inoperable landing gear lights and entered a holding pattern to address the issue, but crashed into the Wasatch Mountains due to inadequate communication with air traffic control.
December 13, 1977	29	0	0	Air Indiana Flight 216	Evansville	Indiana	Douglas DC-3	The pilot failed to remove the gust locks on the right aileron and rudder before takeoff, and the baggage compartment was overloaded, which together caused the aircraft to crash during takeoff. The passengers were the Evansville Purple Aces men's basketball team.
October 20, 1977	6	20	20	Lynyrd Skynyrd plane crash	near Gillsburg	Mississippi	Convair CV-240	The aircraft crashed due to fuel exhaustion caused by the crew's failure to adequately monitor its fuel. Lead vocalist Ronnie Van Zant and guitarist Steve Gaines and backing vocalist Cassie Gaines died in the crash. Among those who survived were drummer Artimus Pyle, guitarist Gary Rossington and keyboard player Billy Powell.
April 4, 1977	72	22	22	Southern Airways Flight 242	New Hope	Georgia	McDonnell Douglas DC-9-31	The aircraft suffered dual-engine failure due to high water intake during a hail storm, executed a forced landing on a state highway, and crashed into buildings, killing 63 aboard the aircraft as well as 9 on the ground. Among those killed was singer Annette Snell.
January 13, 1977	5	0	0	Japan Air Lines Cargo Flight 1045	Anchorage	Alaska	McDonnell Douglas DC-8-62AF	The aircraft stalled and crashed shortly after takeoff due to airframe icing and pilot error. The captain was intoxicated.
April 27, 1976	37	39	51	American Airlines Flight 625	St. Thomas	U.S. Virgin Islands	Boeing 727-195	The aircraft touched down too far down the runway due to improper flap settings and attempted a go around, but then aborted it, failing to utilize reverse thrust in a timely manner and overran the runway. 1 person on the ground was injured.
April 5, 1976	1	49	49	Alaska Airlines Flight 60	Ketchikan	Alaska	Boeing 727-81	The aircraft overran the runway during an attempted go-around.
August 30, 1975	10	22	22	Wien Air Alaska Flight 99	Gambell	Alaska	Fairchild F-27	The aircraft went through several missed approaches in heavy fog and crashed into a mountain. The crew was blamed for improper adherence to instrument flight rules.
June 24, 1975	113	11	11	Eastern Air Lines Flight 66	Queens, New York City	New York	Boeing 727-200	The aircraft experienced windshear caused by a microburst during approach.
January 9, 1975	14	0	0	Golden West Airlines Flight 261	Whittier	California	de Havilland Canada DHC-6 Twin Otter	The flight experienced a mid-air collision with a Cessna 150. A major factor in the accident was the position of the sun at the time.
December 1, 1974	92	0	0	TWA Flight 514	Mount Weather, near Bluemont	Virginia	Boeing 727-200	The aircraft crashed during an unstabilized approach when the aircraft descended prematurely.
December 1, 1974	3	0	0	Northwest Airlines Flight 6231	Haverstraw	New York	Boeing 727-200	The crew of the ferry flight failed to activate the pitot tube heaters, leading to atmospheric icing of the tubes and erroneous airspeed readings. The crew then reacted improperly by raising the nose of the aircraft, causing a stall and a subsequent spin from which the crew did not recover.
September 11, 1974	72	9	10	Eastern Air Lines Flight 212	Charlotte	North Carolina	McDonnell Douglas DC-9-31	The crew failed to maintain sufficient altitude awareness during approach in poor visibility, largely due to distracting themselves with impertinent conversation. The accident was the first to eventually precipitate the sterile cockpit rule. Among those killed was physician James William Colbert Jr..
March 13, 1974	36	0	0	Sierra Pacific Airlines Flight 802	Near Bishop	California	Convair CV-440 Metropolitan	The charter flight crashed into a mountain shortly after takeoff, The cause of crash was not determined. Among those killed was actor and stuntman Janos Prohaska.
January 30, 1974	97	4	4	Pan Am Flight 806	Pago Pago	American Samoa	Boeing 707-321B	The aircraft encountered windshear caused by a microburst during approach and failed to recognize in a timely manner and correct the ensuing excessive descent rate.
January 6, 1974	12	5	5	Commonwealth Commuter Flight 317	Richland Township	Pennsylvania	Beechcraft Model 99A	The captain descended prematurely below glideslope during approach and the aircraft stalled, possibly caused by using a low approach airspeed.
November 3, 1973	1	24	127	National Airlines Flight 27	65 miles SW of Albuquerque	New Mexico	McDonnell Douglas DC-10-10	The aircraft suffered an uncontained engine failure with fragments penetrating the fuselage; one passenger was ejected from the aircraft. The flight subsequently completed a successful emergency landing in Albuquerque.
November 3, 1973	3	0	0	Pan Am Flight 160	Boston	Massachusetts	Boeing 707-321C	The aircraft crashed during an emergency landing following a cargo fire.
September 27, 1973	11	0	0	Texas International Airlines Flight 655	Black Fork Mountain	Arkansas	Convair CV-600	The captain attempted to deviate the flight's route around a severe thunderstorm, bringing them in an area with higher terrain, but did not increase altitude and the flight eventually struck a mountain. A major factor in the accident was that the flight was conducted under visual flight rules at night with no air traffic control while en route.
September 8, 1973	6	0	0	World Airways Flight 802	King Cove	Alaska	McDonnell Douglas DC-8-63F	The captain of the cargo flight failed to adhere to procedures for the instrument approach, straying off-course and crashing into Mount Dutton.
July 31, 1973	89	0	0	Delta Air Lines Flight 723	Boston	Massachusetts	McDonnell Douglas DC-9-31	The crew continued with an unstabilized approach in poor visibility, failing to adequately monitor their altitude, descending below glideslope and crashing short of the runway. Contributing to the accident were the likely improper settings of the flight director made by the crew.
July 23, 1973	38	6	6	Ozark Air Lines Flight 809	Normandy	Missouri	Fairchild-Hiller FH-227	The flight encountered severe vertical windshear during approach, causing a rapid descent and crash. Contributing to the accident was the captain's decision to continue with the approach in spite of the (albeit limited) severe weather reports.
December 31, 1972	5	0	0	1972 Puerto Rico DC-7 crash	Atlantic Ocean near Pinones	Puerto Rico	Douglas DC-7CF	The aircraft crashed shortly after take after one of its engines failed. MLB player Roberto Clemente was killed.
December 29, 1972	101	75	75	Eastern Air Lines Flight 401	Everglades	Florida	Lockheed L-1011 TriStar	The captain inadvertently changed the autopilot settings while the crew was preoccupied with determining whether the landing gear was down, causing a slow descent that was not noticed until just before the crash.
December 20, 1972	10	17	128	1972 Chicago-O'Hare runway collision	Chicago	Illinois	McDonnell Douglas DC-9-31, Convair 880	Delta Flight 954, operating the Convair, experienced miscommunication with air traffic control and were crossing a runway in poor visibility when North Central Airlines Flight 575, operating the DC-9, were in their takeoff roll on the same runway. The DC-9 attempted to fly over the Convair but struck it and then crash landed back on the runway. Ten passengers aboard the DC-9 died in the ensuing fire.
December 8, 1972	45	18	18	United Air Lines Flight 553	Chicago	Illinois	Boeing 737-200	The captain executed an unstabilized approach, beginning it too high and executing a rapid descent using the spoilers, but failed to retract them after reaching the desired altitude and entered a stall to which he failed to properly respond.
June 29, 1972	13	0	0	1972 Lake Winnebago mid-air collision	over Lake Winnebago near Neenah	Wisconsin	Convair CV-580, de Havilland Canada DHC-6 Twin Otter	Both aircraft were operating under visual flight rules under sunny conditions, each failing to detect the other or take evasive action to avoid a mid-air collision.
June 24, 1972	5	15	15	Prinair Flight 191	Ponce	Puerto Rico	de Havilland DH.114 Heron 2B	The aircraft landed without assistance from air traffic control, which was unavailable at the time, then attempted a go-around but the pilot over-rotated leading to a stall at low altitude.
May 30, 1972	4	0	0	Delta Air Lines Flight 9570	Fort Worth	Texas	McDonnell Douglas DC-9-14	The training flight crashed during approach due to severe wake turbulence caused by a McDonnell Douglas DC-10 ahead of the flight. The accident led to aircraft spacing standards behind heavy aircraft.
March 3, 1972	17	35	32	Mohawk Airlines Flight 405	Albany	New York	Fairchild Hiller FH-227	The crew encountered problems with the left engine during approach and attempted to shut it down, but were unable to feather the propeller, leading to asymmetric drag and loss of control of the aircraft. Contributing to the accident was the unstabilized approach and lack of altitude awareness that transpired while the crew was preoccupied with the left engine.
September 4, 1971	111	0	0	Alaska Airlines Flight 1866	Haines Borough	Alaska	Boeing 727	The aircraft descended prematurely during approach and crashed into the Chilkat Range due to misleading navigational information.
June 7, 1971	28	0	3	Allegheny Airlines Flight 485	New Haven	Connecticut	Convair CV-580	The captain attempted to execute a visual approach in poor visibility, forcing him to descend below the minimum allowed descent altitude, and the aircraft crashed short of the runway. It is believed that everyone except the captain initially survived the crash, but all but 3 died in the ensuing fire while attempting to exit the aircraft.
June 6, 1971	50	0	1	Hughes Airwest Flight 706	San Gabriel Mountains, near Duarte	California	McDonnell Douglas DC-9-31, McDonnell Douglas F-4 Phantom II	The F-4 of the Marine Corps was flying under visual flight rules but failed to see the commercial aircraft in time to avoid a mid-air collision. The only survivor was the radar intercept officer of the F-4, who successfully ejected.
May 28, 1971	6	0	0	1971 Colorado Aviation Aero Commander 680 crash	Near Roanoke	Virginia	Aero Commander 680 Super	The charter flight crashed after the pilot flew into poor meteorological conditions. World War II veteran and Medal of Honor recipient Audie Murphy was killed.
December 28, 1970	2	51	53	Trans Caribbean Airways Flight 505	St. Thomas	U.S. Virgin Islands	Boeing 727-2A7	The aircraft overran the runway due to pilot error.
November 27, 1970	47	49	182	Capitol International Airways Flight C2C3/26	Anchorage	Alaska	McDonnell Douglas DC-8-63CF	The charter flight transporting military personnel overran the runway during takeoff due to the landing gear brakes being deployed.
November 14, 1970	75	0	0	Southern Airways Flight 932	Huntington	West Virginia	McDonnell Douglas DC-9-31	The aircraft descended below the minimum descent altitude during approach and crashed short of the runway. The charter flight was carrying the Marshall University Thundering Herd football team.
October 2, 1970	31	9	9	Wichita State University football team plane crash	near Loveland Pass, 8 miles west of Silver Plume	Colorado	Martin 4-0-4	The company president, serving as first officer, attempted to fly a poorly planned scenic route and the aircraft entered a box canyon from which it was unable to climb out, crashing into a mountain ridge. Among the fatalities were 14 members of the Wichita State University football team including head coach Ben Wilson.
March 17, 1970	1	2	72	Eastern Air Lines Shuttle Flight 1320	inbound to Boston	Massachusetts	McDonnell Douglas DC-9-31	A suicidal hijacker shot both the captain and first officer. The first officer was able to get control of the gun and shoot the perpetrator before succumbing to his wounds. The captain then obtained the gun and hit the assailant and proceeded to safely land the plane. The perpetrator was arrested.
November 19, 1969	14	0	0	Mohawk Airlines Flight 411	Fort Ann	New York	Fairchild Hiller FH-227	The captain executed an improper instrument approach, entering a downdraft near terrain at low altitude that caused an unrecoverable descent.
September 9, 1969	83	0	0	Allegheny Airlines Flight 853	Moral Township	Indiana	McDonnell Douglas DC-9-31, Piper PA-28 Cherokee	The Piper was operating under visual flight rules and failed to see the faster DC-9 in time to avoid a mid-air collision.
July 26, 1969	5	0	0	TWA Flight 5787	Pomona	New Jersey	Boeing 707-331C	The aircraft crashed on approach due to a hydraulic failure during a simulated engine failure.
March 5, 1969	19	0	0	Prinair Flight 277	Fajardo	Puerto Rico	de Havilland DH.114 Heron 2B	The location of the aircraft was mistook by air traffic control, leading to premature directions to descend that led to a crash into terrain that was not visible to the crew until just before the collision.
February 18, 1969	35	0	0	Hawthorne Nevada Airlines Flight 708	Mount Whitney, near Lone Pine	California	Douglas DC-3	The flight was operating under visual flight rules, but entered weather and terrain conditions necessitating instrument flight rules and crashed into Mount Whitney.
January 18, 1969	38	0	0	United Air Lines Flight 266	Santa Monica Bay, off Santa Monica	California	Boeing 727-22C	The aircraft lost all electrical power shortly after takeoff in a series of events, leading to loss of altitude and situational awareness by the crew and a crash into the bay. It is unclear why the backup electrical system was not activated, or if it were, why it failed to function as well.
January 13, 1969	15	17	30	Scandinavian Airlines System Flight 933	Santa Monica Bay, off Santa Monica	California	McDonnell Douglas DC-8-62	The crew became distracted during approach by lack of confirmation that the nose gear was properly deployed and lost situational awareness; this combined with a series of other mistakes led to the aircraft crashing into the bay.
January 6, 1969	11	17	17	Allegheny Airlines Flight 737	Lafayette Township	Pennsylvania	Convair CV-580	The aircraft crashed during an instrument approach in winter weather for undetermined reasons.
December 27, 1968	28	24	18	North Central Airlines Flight 458	Chicago	Illinois	Convair CV-580	The captain is believed to have become disoriented with respect to the approach lights and attempted a go-around, but the aircraft climbed to the point of causing a stall and crashed into a hangar, killing 27 onboard 1 person on ground. All 18 survivors and 6 people on the ground were injured.
December 26, 1968	3	0	0	Pan Am Flight 799	Anchorage	Alaska	Boeing 707-321C	The aircraft crashed shortly after takeoff because the flaps were not deployed.
December 24, 1968	20	27	27	Allegheny Airlines Flight 736	Bradford	Pennsylvania	Convair CV-580	The crew lost altitude awareness during approach while trying to visually locate the runway, descending below the minimum descent altitude and striking trees.
December 2, 1968	39	0	0	Wien Consolidated Airlines Flight 55	Pedro Bay	Alaska	Fairchild F-27	The aircraft encountered severe turbulence and experienced structural failure in the right wing due to the presence of fatigue cracks that went unnoticed during maintenance, leading to an unrecoverable spiraling dive.
October 25, 1968	32	10	10	Northeast Airlines Flight 946	Etna	New Hampshire	Fairchild Hiller FH-227	The aircraft crashed into terrain during approach because it was flying 600 feet below its required altitude, apparently due to confusion of the part of the crew.
August 14, 1968	21	0	0	Los Angeles Airways Flight 417	Compton	California	Sikorsky S-61L	The helicopter experienced failure of the blade rotor system, where one blade struck the fuselage, leading to a loss of balance and failure of all five rotor blades and subsequent separation of the rear fuselage and tail.
August 10, 1968	35	2	2	Piedmont Airlines Flight 230	Charleston	West Virginia	Fairchild Hiller FH-227B	The aircraft crashed short of the runway while landing in poor visual conditions.
May 22, 1968	23	0	0	Los Angeles Airways Flight 841	Paramount	California	Sikorsky S-61L	The helicopter lost a rotor blade due to structural failure caused by manufacturing defects, leading to loss of control of the aircraft.
May 3, 1968	85	0	0	Braniff International Airways Flight 352	near Dawson	Texas	Lockheed L-188A Electra	The captain chose to fly into a severe thunderstorm, then attempted to execute a steep 180-degree turn to escape the weather, exceeding the structural limits of the aircraft, which caused it to break apart in mid-air.
March 27, 1968	2	0	49	Ozark Air Lines Flight 965	St. Louis	Missouri	Douglas DC-9-15	The aircraft landed successfully with no injuries to those on board after colliding mid-air with a Cessna 150F killing both of its occupants.
November 20, 1967	70	12	12	TWA Flight 128	Constance	Kentucky	Convair 880	The aircraft crashed short of the runway during an attempted visual approach in poor weather due to its descent below the minimum altitude.
November 6, 1967	1	10	35	TWA Flight 159	Erlanger	Kentucky	Boeing 707-131	The aircraft experienced a compressor stall in an engine due to crossing the jet blast of another aircraft stuck perpendicular to the runway; believing a collision had occurred, the first officer attempted an aborted takeoff but overran the runway. One passenger later died of their injuries.
July 19, 1967	82	0	0	Piedmont Airlines Flight 22	Hendersonville	North Carolina	Boeing 727-22, Cessna 310	The aircraft experienced a mid-air collision with the Cessna shortly after takeoff. Primary blame was placed on the Cessna pilot in one of the first investigations conducted by the NTSB. The investigation was revisited decades later after concerns were raised that the role of air traffic control and factors aboard the Boeing were not adequately considered; the original findings were upheld.
June 23, 1967	34	0	0	Mohawk Airlines Flight 40	Blossburg	Pennsylvania	BAC One-Eleven	A valve in the auxiliary power unit failed, starting a fire that reached the tail and loss of pitch control.
March 30, 1967	19	0	0	Delta Air Lines Flight 9877	Kenner	Louisiana	Douglas DC-8-51	The aircraft which was operating a training flight stalled and crashed on approach due to pilot error killing all 6 onboard and 13 people on the ground.
March 10, 1967	4	0	0	West Coast Airlines Flight 720	near Klamath Falls	Oregon	Fairchild F-27	The aircraft accumulated significant amounts of snow and ice while waiting for takeoff and crashed shortly after becoming airborne, presumably due to a stall.
March 9, 1967	26	0	0	TWA Flight 553	Concord Township	Ohio	McDonnell Douglas DC-9-15, Beechcraft Baron	The flight was operating under visual flight rules and experienced a mid-air collision during a descent, with neither aircraft detecting the other in time to avoid a collision.
March 5, 1967	38	0	0	Lake Central Airlines Flight 527	near Marseilles Township	Ohio	Convair CV-580	A propeller detached from the plane and heavily damaged the fuselage during approach, presumably due to loss of a piston due to excessive wear attributed to a manufacturing defect, leading to a loss of control.
October 1, 1966	18	0	0	West Coast Airlines Flight 956	near Wemme	Oregon	McDonnell Douglas DC-9-14	The aircraft descended below its cleared altitude during approach and crashed.
August 6, 1966	42	0	0	Braniff International Airways Flight 250	near Falls City	Nebraska	BAC One-Eleven	The aircraft entered severe thunderstorms and encountered a strong updraft, causing the right tailplane, vertical stabilizer, and later the right wing to fail, leading to a complete loss of control.
April 22, 1966	83	15	15	American Flyers Airline Flight 280	Ardmore	Oklahoma	Lockheed L-188C Electra	The pilot in command became incapacitated due to a health issue during approach and the plane overshot the runway.
December 4, 1965	4	49	108	1965 Carmel mid-air collision	Carmel	New York	Lockheed L-1049C Super Constellation, Boeing 707-131B	Eastern Air Lines Flight 853, flying the Constellation, approached TWA Flight 42, flying the Boeing, which appeared to be at the same altitude. Evasive maneuvers by both aircraft led to a mid-air collision. The Boeing safely made an emergency landing while the Constellation crashed, with 4 fatalities.
November 11, 1965	43	35	48	United Air Lines Flight 227	Salt Lake City	Utah	Boeing 727-22	The crew executed an unstabilized approach, descending at roughly three times the normal descent rate, and crashed short of the runway. The captain was blamed for not effectively managing the approach. All aboard initially survived the crash, with the fatalities occurring due to the subsequent fire.
November 8, 1965	58	4	4	American Airlines Flight 383	Constance	Kentucky	Boeing 727-23	The crew descended prematurely during approach in deteriorating weather and crashed short of the runway due to their loss of altitude awareness. Record producer Israel Horowitz was among the survivors.
August 16, 1965	30	0	0	United Air Lines Flight 389	Lake Michigan, 20 east of Fort Sheridan	Illinois	Boeing 727-22	The aircraft crashed during a routine descent; it is suspected the crew misread their altimeters by 10,000 feet.
February 8, 1965	84	0	0	Eastern Air Lines Flight 663	Atlantic Ocean, off of Wantagh	New York	Douglas DC-7B	The crew executed a steep right bank shortly after takeoff to avoid an apparently imminent collision with Pan Am Flight 212, which is believed to have caused spatial disorientation that prevented the pilot from recovering before striking the water.
December 24, 1964	3	0	0	Flying Tiger Line Flight 282	San Bruno	California	Lockheed L-1049H Super Constellation	The aircraft deviated from its departure course for unknown reasons into an area of elevated terrain and crashed shortly after takeoff.
November 15, 1964	29	0	0	Bonanza Air Lines Flight 114	near Sloan	Nevada	Fairchild F-27	The aircraft struck the top of a ridge during approach and exploded; an inappropriately labeled chart is blamed.
July 9, 1964	39	0	0	United Air Lines Flight 823	near Parrottsville	Tennessee	Vickers Viscount 745D	A fire occurred in the passenger cabin and spread, leading to a loss of control.
May 7, 1964	44	0	0	Pacific Air Lines Flight 773	near Danville	California	Fairchild F-27	Francisco Paula Gonzales a passenger entered the cockpit and shot the captain and then the first officer and finally himself, causing the aircraft fall out of control in a murder-suicide. The incident led to an FAA requirement to keep the cockpit door locked during flight in most circumstances.
March 1, 1964	85	0	0	Paradise Airlines Flight 901A	near Lake Tahoe	California	Lockheed L-049 Constellation	The pilot attempted a visual approach in poor weather and visibility, then likely attempted a missed approach and diversion to another airport, but struck terrain near the lake.
February 25, 1964	58	0	0	Eastern Air Lines Flight 304	Lake Pontchartrain, near New Orleans	Louisiana	Douglas DC-8	It was concluded that a malfunctioning pitch trim compensator caused the crew to trim the horizontal stabilizer in a manner that led to a loss of control during severe turbulence. Among those killed was actor and singer Kenneth Spencer.
December 8, 1963	81	0	0	Pan Am Flight 214	Elkton	Maryland	Boeing 707-121	The aircraft was struck by lightning which is believed to have ignited fuel vapors in one of the fuel tanks, causing an explosion that destroyed one of the wings and led to loss of control.
July 2, 1963	7	36	36	Mohawk Airlines Flight 121	Rochester	New York	Martin 4-0-4	The aircraft attempted to takeoff in poor weather under threats from the captain's superiors and encountered windshear, leading to a loss of control and the left wing impacting the ground.
June 3, 1963	101	0	0	Northwest Orient Airlines Flight 293	Clarence Strait, near Annette Island	Alaska	Douglas DC-7C	The aircraft crashed off the coast for unknown reasons.
February 12, 1963	43	0	0	Northwest Orient Airlines Flight 705	Everglades	Florida	Boeing 720	The aircraft encountered poor weather and experienced severe vertical air drafts shortly after takeoff, causing rapid ascents and descents, causing the aircraft to break up during a steep dive.
November 30, 1962	25	Unknown	26	Eastern Air Lines Flight 512	New York City	New York	Douglas DC-7B	The crew attempted a go-around in poor visibility, but failed to use sufficient power or rotation to stop the descent.
November 23, 1962	17	0	0	United Air Lines Flight 297	near Ellicott City	Maryland	Vickers Viscount 745D	The aircraft suffered a bird strike that severely damaged the left horizontal stabilizer, leading to a loss of control.
July 22, 1962	27	13	13	Canadian Pacific Air Lines Flight 301	Honolulu	Hawaii	Bristol Britannia 314	The crew attempted a go-around but insufficient altitude remained for the aircraft to climb successfully.
May 22, 1962	45	0	0	Continental Airlines Flight 11	near Unionville	Missouri	Boeing 707-124	A suicidal passenger exploded a bomb in a lavatory causing loss of the tail and a crash.
March 1, 1962	95	0	0	American Airlines Flight 1	Jamaica Bay, Queens, New York City	New York	Boeing 707-123B	The aircraft experienced an uncommanded rudder movement due to a manufacturing defect shortly after takeoff, crashing into the bay. Among those killed were former United States Navy admiral Richard L. Conolly, businessmen George T. Felbeck, W. Alton Jones, Arnold Kirkeby, and olympic gold medalist Emelyn Whiton.
November 8, 1961	77	2	2	Imperial Airlines Flight 201/8	near Richmond	Virginia	Lockheed L-049E Constellation	Numerous errors and poor judgement by the crew led to loss of engine power and loss of control during approach from which they were unable to recover.
September 17, 1961	37	0	0	Northwest Orient Airlines Flight 706	Chicago	Illinois	Lockheed L-188C Electra	Improper maintenance led to failure of the control cable to the ailerons, causing an uncontrollable right bank shortly after takeoff and eventual crash.
September 1, 1961	78	0	0	TWA Flight 529	Willowbrook Township	Illinois	Lockheed L-049 Constellation	It was concluded that loss of a bolt from the elevator control mechanism caused an abrupt pitch up, leading to a stall and crash shortly after takeoff.
July 21, 1961	6	0	0	Alaska Airlines Flight 779	Shemya	Alaska	Douglas DC-6A	The aircraft crashed short of the runway during approach, attributed to improper guidance by air traffic control and lack of approach and runway lighting.
July 11, 1961	18	84	105	United Airlines Flight 859	Denver	Colorado	Douglas DC-8-12	Both left engines failed to generate reverse thrust after landing and instead continued to generate forward thrust, causing the aircraft to depart the runway and break apart, leading to a fire.
January 28, 1961	6	0	0	American Airlines Flight 1502	Atlantic Ocean, 5 miles from Montauk	New York	Boeing 707-123	The aircraft experienced a loss of control for undetermined reasons.
December 16, 1960	134	0	0	1960 New York mid-air collision	New York City	New York	Douglas DC-8-11, Lockheed L-1049 Super Constellation	United Flight 826, operating the DC-8, exceeded its clearance given by air traffic control and collided with TWA Flight 266, operating the Super Constellation. The DC-8 crashed on Staten Island, while the Super Constellation crashed in Brooklyn, ultimately killing all 128 onboard both aircraft as well as 6 people on the ground.
October 29, 1960	22	26	26	California Polytechnic State University football team plane crash	Swanton Township	Ohio	Curtiss C-46 Commando	The aircraft crashed during takeoff due to a premature liftoff by the pilot. Contributing factors were that the aircraft was overloaded and partial loss of power from one engine.
October 4, 1960	62	10	10	Eastern Air Lines Flight 375	Boston	Massachusetts	Lockheed L-188A Electra	The aircraft suffered severe engine damage due to a bird strike during takeoff that led to an unrecoverable asymmetric stall. A possible contributing factor was improper maintenance to the first officer seat that may have led to inadvertent control inputs during the emergency.
September 19, 1960	80	10	14	World Airways Flight 830	Barrigada	Guam	Douglas DC-6	The aircraft crashed shortly after takeoff due to pilot error.
July 27, 1960	13	0	0	Chicago Helicopter Airways Flight 698	Forest Park, Chicago	Illinois	Sikorsky S-58C	Part of the helicopters main rotor failed causing an in-flight breakup.
March 17, 1960	63	0	0	Northwest Orient Airlines Flight 710	Tobin Township	Indiana	Lockheed L-188C Electra	The aircraft came apart in mid-air, believed to be due to development of wing flutter.
January 18, 1960	50	0	0	Capital Airlines Flight 20	Holdcroft	Virginia	Vickers Viscount 745D	The aircraft experienced severe icing which caused complete engine failure; the crew was able to restart one engine but this generated asymmetric thrust that was unable to generate sufficient lift, leading to a crash.
January 6, 1960	34	0	0	National Airlines Flight 2511	near Bolivia	North Carolina	Douglas DC-6B	Dynamite detonated on board causing a mid-air explosion and destruction of the aircraft. A suicide bombing is suspected.
December 1, 1959	25	1	1	Allegheny Airlines Flight 371	South Williamsport	Pennsylvania	Martin 2-0-2	A malfunction of the aircraft's compass led the aircraft off course during a missed approach and the flight crashed into terrain.
November 24, 1959	11	Unknown	0	TWA Flight 595	Chicago	Illinois	Lockheed L-1049H Super Constellation	The aircraft crashed during an attempted emergency landing due to pilot error after the fire alarm for the No. 2 engine activated despite no fire actually occurring, all 3 crew members were killed along with 8 people on the ground.
November 16, 1959	42	0	0	National Airlines Flight 967	Gulf of Mexico, southeast of Pensacola	Florida	Martin 2-0-2	The aircraft is believed to have suffered an in-flight explosion, suspected to be due to a bomb.
October 30, 1959	26	1	1	Piedmont Airlines Flight 349	near Crozet	Virginia	Douglas DC-3	The aircraft crashed into terrain during approach due to a navigational error by the pilot.
October 19, 1959	4	4	4	1959 Washington Boeing 707 crash	Stillaguamish River near Arlington	Washington	Boeing 707-227	The aircraft crashed after three of its four engines separated due to excessive control inputs made by one of the pilots.
September 29, 1959	34	0	0	Braniff International Airways Flight 542	near Buffalo	Texas	Lockheed L-188A Electra	The aircraft came apart in mid-air, initially for unknown reasons, but was eventually believed to be due to development of wing flutter after a similar accident, Northwest Orient Airlines Flight 710.
August 15, 1959	5	0	0	American Airlines Flight 514	Calverton	New York	Boeing 707-123	The aircraft developed excessive yaw during approach, which the crew failed to recognize and correct.
May 12, 1959	31	0	0	Capital Airlines Flight 75	Chase	Maryland	Vickers Viscount 745D	The aircraft encountered severe turbulence which caused a steep descent that led to failure of the aircraft's fuselage.
February 3, 1959	4	0	0	The Day the Music Died	near Clear Lake	Iowa	Beechcraft Bonanza	The charter flight was operating under visual flight rules in poor visibility and weather and the pilot (who was not qualified for instrument flight rules) became disoriented, leading to a crash. In addition to the pilot, musicians Buddy Holly, Ritchie Valens, and The Big Bopper were killed. The song "American Pie" refers to the incident.
February 3, 1959	65	8	8	American Airlines Flight 320	New York City	New York	Lockheed L-188A Electra	The aircraft descended below glideslope during approach in poor weather and crashed short of the runway.
January 8, 1959	10	0	0	Southeast Airlines Flight 308	Holston Mountain	Tennessee	Douglas DC-3A	The crew made a navigational error during approach and struck the mountain.
August 15, 1958	25	9	9	Northeast Airlines Flight 258	Nantucket	Massachusetts	Convair CV-240	The crew attempted an approach using visual flight rules under poor visibility that precluded such an approach and crashed short of the runway.
April 21, 1958	49	0	0	United Air Lines Flight 736	Enterprise	Nevada	Douglas DC-7, North American F-100 Super Sabre	The two aircraft approached each other at high speed and were unable to avoid a mid-air collision.
April 6, 1958	47	0	0	Capital Airlines Flight 67	Saginaw Bay, near Freeland	Michigan	Vickers Viscount 745D	The plane experienced severe icing which led to an unrecoverable stall during approach.
November 8, 1957	44	0	0	Pan Am Flight 7	Pacific Ocean, en route to Honolulu	Hawaii	Boeing 377 Stratocruiser	The flight disappears from radio contact and does not arrive in Hawaii; debris and bodies are located weeks later. The cause was not determined, though the investigation found high levels of carbon monoxide in many of the human remains.
February 1, 1957	20	78	81	Northeast Airlines Flight 823	Queens, New York City	New York	Douglas DC-6A	The aircraft deviated left from its assigned heading during climbout and struck terrain. Spatial disorientation on the part of the captain while flying in the clouds is blamed.
January 31, 1957	8	75–78	1	1957 Pacoima mid-air collision	Over San Fernando Valley	California	Douglas DC-7B	The aircraft which was operating a test flight was involved in a mid-air collision with a United States Air Force F-89J Scorpian. All 4 occupants of the DC-7, 1 of the 2 occupants of the F-89 and 3 people on the ground were killed.
January 6, 1957	1	7	9	American Airlines Flight 327	Near Tulsa	Oklahoma	Convair CV-240-0	The aircraft collided crashed on approach in poor weather conditions.
July 9, 1956	1	5	34	Trans-Canada Air Lines Flight 304	over Flat Rock	Michigan	Vickers Viscount 724	A propeller detached from its engine and one blade penetrated the fuselage, killing one passenger. The flight then made a successful emergency landing.
June 30, 1956	128	0	0	1956 Grand Canyon mid-air collision	Grand Canyon	Arizona	Douglas DC-7 Mainliner, Lockheed L-1049A Super Constellation	Both flights were operating under visual flight rules and failed to detect the other, leading to a mid-air collision. The accident spurred the creation of the Federal Aviation Administration.
June 20, 1956	74	0	0	Linea Aeropostal Venezolana Flight 253	Atlantic Ocean, off of Asbury Park	New Jersey	Lockheed L-1049E Super Constellation	The aircraft had trouble with an engine and was returning for an emergency landing when a fire started and the aircraft lost control.
April 2, 1956	5	2	33	Northwest Orient Airlines Flight 2	Puget Sound, off of Point Robinson	Washington	Boeing 377 Stratocruiser	The flight engineer inadvertently left the cowl flaps on the engines open during takeoff, which disrupted airflow over the wings and led to decreased lift. Unknown at the time and unable to fly normally, the captain elected to ditch the aircraft in Puget Sound; all aboard initially survived but 5 later died of their injuries.
April 1, 1956	22	14	14	TWA Flight 400	Moon Township	Pennsylvania	Martin 4-0-4	The aircraft experienced a fire warning in one of the engines just after takeoff due to a malfunction of the exhaust system that blew exhaust onto a temperature sensor, causing the first officer to shut down the engine. The captain stopped the first officer from manually feathering the engine, and the autofeather device did not feather the engine, leading to asymmetric drag and a crash.
November 1, 1955	44	0	0	United Air Lines Flight 629	Longmont	Colorado	Douglas DC-6B	Dynamite was placed in checked luggage by Jack Gilbert Graham and detonated in flight.
October 6, 1955	66	0	0	United Air Lines Flight 409	near Centennial	Wyoming	Douglas DC-4	The aircraft struck terrain for undetermined reasons.
August 4, 1955	30	0	0	American Airlines Flight 476	Near Fort Leonard Wood	Missouri	Convair CV-240-0	The aircraft crashed during an attempted emergency landing after an engine fire caused the right wing to separate.
April 4, 1955	3	0	0	1955 MacArthur Airport United Air Lines crash	Islip	New York	Douglas DC-6	The training flight attempted to simulate a single engine failure during takeoff, but actually caused reverse thrust in the engine leading to a loss of control.
March 26, 1955	4	0	19	Pan Am Flight 845/26	Pacific Ocean, 35 miles west of the Oregon coast	Oregon	Boeing 377 Stratocruiser	An engine separated from the aircraft, forcing the aircraft to be ditched.
March 20, 1955	13	22	22	American Airlines Flight 711	near Springfield	Missouri	Convair CV-240	The crew is thought to have lost altitude awareness during approach, leading to a crash short of the runway.
February 19, 1955	16	0	0	TWA Flight 260	Sandia Mountains	New Mexico	Martin 4-0-4	The aircraft struck terrain at the initial stages of approach. A variety of causes were considered possible but the cause was not definitively determined.
January 12, 1955	15	0	0	1955 Cincinnati mid-air collision	Hebron	Kentucky	Martin 2-0-2, Douglas DC-3	TWA Flight 694, operating the Martin 2–0–2, collided in mid-air after takeoff with a privately owned DC-3 that entered airport airspace without clearance.
December 18, 1954	26	Unknown	6	Linee Aeree Italiane Flight 451	New York City	New York	Douglas DC-6B	The aircraft collided with a pier during landing due to pilot error.
February 26, 1954	9	0	0	Western Air Lines Flight 34	Near Wright	Wyoming	Convair CV-240-1	The aircraft crashed while flying in severe weather.
October 29, 1953	19	0	0	BCPA Flight 304	near Woodside	California	Douglas DC-6	The aircraft crashed into terrain during approach due to an apparent failure of the crew to correctly execute an instrument approach.
September 16, 1953	28	0	0	American Airlines Flight 723	Colonie	New York	Convair CV-240-0	The aircraft descended too low during approach in poor visibility and struck a set of radio towers.
July 12, 1953	58	0	0	Transocean Air Lines Flight 512	Pacific Ocean, approximately 340 nm east of Wake Island, en route to Honolulu	Hawaii	Douglas DC-6A	The aircraft was lost in the ocean for undetermined reasons.
May 17, 1953	20	1	1	Delta Air Lines Flight 318	Near Marshall	Texas	Douglas DC-3	The aircraft crashed after flying into a downdraft during a thunderstorm.
April 20, 1953	8	Unknown	2	Western Air Lines Flight 636	Between San Francisco and Oakland	California	Douglas DC-6B	The aircraft crashed into San Francisco Bay during a short flight from San Francisco to Oakland on the opposite side of the bay.
March 20, 1953	35	0	0	Transocean Air Lines Flight 942	Oakland	California	Douglas DC-4	The aircraft crashed after the pilots lost control of the aircraft for unknown reasons.
February 14, 1953	46	0	0	National Airlines Flight 470	Gulf of Mexico, 20 miles off Fort Morgan	Alabama	Douglas DC-6	The aircraft is believed to have encountered severe weather and crashed.
June 28, 1952	2	0	60	American Airlines Flight 910	Dallas	Texas	Douglas DC-6	The aircraft collided with a private Temco Swift during approach. Primary blame was placed on the private aircraft, which was operating under visual flight rules.
April 11, 1952	52	Unknown	17	Pan Am Flight 526A	Atlantic Ocean, about 11 miles NW of San Juan	Puerto Rico	Douglas DC-4	Both starboard engines failed due to inadequate maintenance, causing the crew to ditch shortly after takeoff.
February 11, 1952	33	34	34	National Airlines Flight 101	Elizabeth	New Jersey	Douglas DC-6	The propeller governor of engine #3 malfunctioned and caused the engine to go into reverse during climb-out, while engine #4 was feathered, leading to a loss of control and a crash into an apartment, where 4 occupants were killed along with 29 on board the aircraft.
January 22, 1952	30	0	0	American Airlines Flight 6780	Elizabeth	New Jersey	Convair CV-240	The aircraft crashed during approach for unknown reasons; 7 people on the ground were killed in addition to all 23 aboard.
December 29, 1951	26	14	14	Continental Charters Flight 44-2	near Napoli	New York	Curtiss C-46 Commando	The aircraft struck terrain in poor weather and visibility due to the crew attempting to fly under visual flight rules in inappropriate conditions and at an insufficient altitude.
December 16, 1951	56	1	0	1951 Miami Airlines C-46 crash	Elizabeth	New Jersey	Curtiss C-46F-1-CU Commando	The right engine developed a mechanical failure and a fire during and after takeoff, eventually causing a loss of control, all on board were killed among them dancer Doris Ruby.
August 24, 1951	50	0	0	United Air Lines Flight 615	near Decoto	California	Douglas DC-6B	The pilot ignored instrument approach procedures and attempted to rely on an automatic direction finder which led the plane off course and below the necessary altitude, leading to a crash into terrain.
July 21, 1951	37	0	0	Canadian Pacific Air Lines Flight 3505	Near Cape Spencer	Alaska	Douglas DC-4	The aircraft disappeared during the Vancouver-Anchorage segment of a flight from Vancouver to Tokyo.
June 30, 1951	50	0	0	United Air Lines Flight 610	near Fort Collins	Colorado	Douglas DC-6	The crew apparently made a navigational error during approach, missing a turn and flying into terrain.
April 25, 1951	43	0	0	Cubana de Aviación Flight 493	Key West	Florida	Douglas DC-4, Beechcraft SNB-1 Kansan	Both aircraft were operating under visual flight rules in good visibility but failed to detect each other, leading to a mid-air collision.
January 14, 1951	7	11	21	National Airlines Flight 83	Philadelphia	Pennsylvania	Douglas DC-4	The aircraft touched down far down the runway in icy conditions and overran the runway. Flight attendant Frankie Housley was killed while attempting to rescue more passengers after previously saving 10 others.
June 23, 1950	58	0	0	Northwest Orient Airlines Flight 2501	Lake Michigan, off Benton Harbor	Michigan	Douglas DC-4	The flight disappeared for unknown reasons; later debris and body fragments were found on the surface.
March 7, 1950	15	0	0	Northwest Orient Airlines Flight 307	Minneapolis	Minnesota	Martin 2-0-2	The aircraft struck a flagpole during approach due to pilot error.
November 29, 1949	28	16	18	American Airlines Flight 157	Dallas	Texas	Douglas DC-6	The crew made a series of mistakes during an approach after the loss of one engine, striking the runway tail-first.
November 1, 1949	55	1	1	Eastern Air Lines Flight 537	Alexandria	Virginia	Douglas DC-4, Lockheed P-38 Lightning	The P-38 attempted to land without clearance, which led to a mid-air collision. The only survivor was the pilot of the P-38.
July 12, 1949	35	13	13	Standard Air Lines Flight 897R	Chatsworth	California	Curtiss C-46E Commando	The pilot descended below the minimum altitude during approach in poor visibility, with the right wing clipping the side of a hill and instigating a crash.
June 7, 1949	53	Unknown	28	1949 Strato-Freight Curtiss C-46A crash	Atlantic Ocean, near San Juan	Puerto Rico	Curtiss Wright C-46D	Installation of incorrect spark plugs caused the right engine to fail during takeoff, causing insufficient lift for takeoff, and the aircraft settled into the ocean.
December 28, 1948	32	0	0	1948 Airborne Transport DC-3 disappearance	Atlantic Ocean, en route to Miami	Florida	Douglas DST	The flight disappeared for unknown reasons.
August 29, 1948	37	0	0	Northwest Orient Airlines Flight 421	Fountain City	Wisconsin	Martin 2-0-2	The left wing experienced structural failure of the left wing due to fatigue, causing a crash.
June 17, 1948	43	0	0	United Air Lines Flight 624	Conyngham Township	Pennsylvania	Douglas DC-6	The crew responded to a false fire warning in the cargo hold by discharging the fire extinguisher without opening the pressure release valves, which caused a buildup of carbon dioxide in the cockpit that led to crew incapacitation and a crash. Among those killed were theater producer Earl Carroll, actress Beryl Wallace and businessman Henry L. Jackson.
March 12, 1948	30	0	0	Northwest Orient Airlines Flight 4422	Mount Sanford	Alaska	Douglas C-54 Skymaster	The flight deviated from its proper airway and crashed into the mountain.
March 10, 1948	12	1	1	Delta Air Lines Flight 705	Near Forest View	Illinois	Douglas DC-4	The aircraft stalled shortly after takeoff for unknown reasons.
January 28, 1948	32	0	0	1948 Los Gatos DC-3 crash	Diablo Range, west of Coalinga	California	Douglas DC-3	The left engine developed a fire that eventually spread and caused failure of the airframe.
October 26, 1947	18	0	0	Pan Am Flight 923	Annette Island	Alaska	Douglas DC-4	The flight struck a mountain for unknown reasons.
October 24, 1947	52	0	0	United Air Lines Flight 608	Bryce Canyon National Park	Utah	Douglas DC-6	A fire ignited during fuel transfer due to a design flaw, leading to an in-flight breakup of the airframe and loss of control during an emergency approach.
June 13, 1947	50	0	0	Pennsylvania Central Airlines Flight 410	near Charles Town	West Virginia	Douglas DC-4	The pilot descended below the prescribed minimum altitude during approach and struck terrain.
May 30, 1947	53	0	0	Eastern Air Lines Flight 605	near Bainbridge	Maryland	Douglas C-54 Skymaster	The aircraft suddenly lost control for undetermined reasons.
May 29, 1947	43	5	5	United Air Lines Flight 521	Queens, New York City	New York	Douglas DC-4	The pilot attempted an aborted takeoff but overran the runway.
April 22, 1947	9	0	0	1947 Columbus mid-air collision	Columbus	Georgia	Douglas DC-3C	A Douglas DC-3 operated by Delta Air Lines collided with a privately operated Vultee BT-13 Valiant.
January 12, 1947	18	1	1	Eastern Air Lines Flight 665	Galax	Virginia	Douglas DC-3	The aircraft struck terrain in poor weather due to disorientation and poor navigation on the part of the pilot.
December 28, 1946	2	19	19	American Airlines Flight 2207	Michigan City	Indiana	Douglas C-50A	The aircraft lost engine power after running out of fuel.
July 11, 1946	5	1	1	TWA Flight 513	Bern Township	Pennsylvania	Lockheed L-049 Constellation	A fire erupted in the baggage compartment due to faulty wiring, causing a loss of control.
January 6, 1946	3	5	16	Pennsylvania Central Airlines Flight 105	Birmingham	Alabama	Douglas DC-3	The aircraft attempted to land from above glideslope and with too high a speed and overran the runway.
March 6, 1946	27	0	0	American Airlines Flight 6-103	Near Pine Valley	California	Douglas DC-3-277B	The aircraft crashed into a mountain in poor visual conditions.
October 5, 1945	2		13	National Airlines Flight 16	Lakeland	Florida	Lockheed 18-50 Lodestar	The pilot attempted a missed approach too late and overran the runway.
July 12, 1945	3	4	20	Eastern Air Lines Flight 45	Near Lamar	South Carolina	Douglas DC-3-201C	The aircraft was involved in a mid-air collision with a United States Army Air Forces Douglas A-26 Invader. 1 passenger aboard the DC-3 and 2 of the 3 A-26 crewman were killed.
June 20, 1944	7	0	0	TWA Flight 277	Fort Mountain, Baxter State Park	Maine	Douglas C-54 Skymaster	The flight drifted off course in poor weather and struck mountainous terrain.
February 10, 1944	24	0	0	American Airlines Flight 2	Mississippi River, 18 miles SW of Memphis	Tennessee	Douglas DC-3-277A	The flight crashed for unknown reasons.
October 15, 1943	11	0	0	American Airlines Flight 63 (Flagship Missouri)	Centerville	Tennessee	Douglas DC-3-178	The aircraft developed severe icing which eventually made it unable to maintain altitude, causing it to strike terrain.
July 28, 1943	20	2	2	American Airlines Flight 63 (Flagship Ohio)	near Trammel	Kentucky	Douglas DC-3-178	The flight lost control due to severe turbulence and a downdraft caused by a thunderstorm.
January 21, 1943	19	0	0	Pan Am Flight 1104	near Ukiah	California	Martin M-130	The flight became off-course in poor weather at night and struck a mountain.
October 23, 1942	12	0	2	American Airlines Flight 28	Chino Canyon near Palm Springs	California	Douglas DC-3, Lockheed B-34 Lexington	The DC-3 was struck by the B-34 as its pilot was attempting to get closer to it to establish visual communication with the first officer, as the two were friends. The DC-3 lost control and crashed, killing all on board, while the B-34 landed successfully with minor damage.
January 16, 1942	22	0	0	TWA Flight 3	Potosi Mountain	Nevada	Douglas DC-3	The captain executed an improper flight plan, incorporating a heading appropriate for a different takeoff airport, that caused the aircraft to strike terrain at its cruising altitude. Among the fatalities was actress Carole Lombard.
October 30, 1941	14	1	1	Northwest Airlines Flight 5	Moorhead	Minnesota	Douglas DC-3	The aircraft developed severe icing on its wings and crashed. The captain was the sole survivor, though he would die a year later in another aviation accident.
February 26, 1941	8	8	8	Eastern Air Lines Flight 21	Morrow	Georgia	Douglas DC-3	The aircraft struck terrain during approach due to improperly set altimeters. Among those killed were Congressman William D. Byron and magazine editor Clara Littledale while World War I veteran and Medal of Honor recipient Eddie Rickenbacker and Pulitzer Prize winning journalist Harold A. Littledale were among the survivors.
August 31, 1940	25	0	0	Lovettsville air disaster	Lovettsville	Virginia	Douglas DC-3	The aircraft is believed to have crashed due to a lightning strike.
January 21, 1939	3	10	10	1939 Imperial Airways Short Empire ditching	Atlantic Ocean, en route from New York City	New York	Short Empire	The aircraft landed in the ocean because of engine failure due to icing and sank.
January 13, 1939	4	0	0	Northwest Airlines Flight 1	near Miles City	Montana	Lockheed Model 14H Super Electra	A fire rapidly developed in the cockpit shortly after takeoff, possibly due to a fuel leak from a cross-feed fuel valve, and overwhelmed the crew and caused a loss of control.
March 1, 1938	9	0	0	TWA Flight 8	Yosemite National Park	California	Douglas DC-2	The flight encountered severe weather and crashed into a mountain. The aircraft was not located until three months later.
January 11, 1938	7	0	0	Samoan Clipper	Pago Pago	American Samoa	Sikorsky S-42	The crew attempted to dump fuel in preparation for an emergency landing due to an oil leak, but a fire ignited and caused an explosion.
January 10, 1938	10	0	0	Northwest Airlines Flight 2	Bridger Mountains, near Bozeman	Montana	Lockheed Model 14H Super Electra	The aircraft is believed to have crashed due to failure of the empennage due to aeroelastic flutter, likely caused by weather-induced turbulence.
May 6, 1937	36	Unknown	62	Hindenburg disaster	NAS Lakehurst, Manchester Township	New Jersey	Hindenburg-class airship	The hydrogen-filled airship caught fire and was destroyed while trying to dock. One person on the ground was also killed.
March 25, 1937	13	0	0	TWA Flight 15A	Upper St. Clair Township	Pennsylvania	Douglas DC-2	The aircraft is believed to have crashed due to ice accumulation on the control surfaces.
January 12, 1937	5	Unknown	8	Western Air Express Flight 7	near Newhall	California	Boeing 247D	The aircraft went off-course in poor visibility and struck a ridge.
December 27, 1936	12	0	0	United Air Lines Flight 34	near Newhall	California	Boeing 247D	The pilot flew too low during approach and struck terrain.
August 5, 1936	8	0	0	Chicago and Southern Air Lines Flight 4	St. Louis	Missouri	Lockheed Model 10B Electra	The aircraft crashed shortly after takeoff presumably due to a lack of altitude awareness due to fog.
April 7, 1936	12	2	2	TWA Flight 1	Cheat Mountain, Wharton Township	Pennsylvania	Douglas DC-2	The aircraft went off-course and crashed into terrain in poor visibility.
January 14, 1936	17	0	0	American Airlines Flight 1	near Goodwin	Arkansas	Douglas DC-2-210	The aircraft crashed for undetermined reasons.
October 7, 1935	12	0	0	United Air Lines Flight 4	near Hecla	Wyoming	Boeing 247D	The pilot is believed to lost spatial awareness and crashed into terrain.
May 6, 1935	5	8	8	TWA Flight 6	near Atlanta	Missouri	Douglas DC-2	The aircraft crashed into terrain due to low visibility.
February 23, 1934	8	0	0	1934 United Air Lines Boeing 247 crash	Wasatch Mountains, 35 miles east of Salt Lake City	Utah	Boeing 247	The aircraft crashed into terrain in poor weather.
October 10, 1933	7	0	0	United Air Lines Flight 23	near Chesterton	Indiana	Boeing 247D	The aircraft suffered a mid-air explosion due to a bomb in the baggage compartment and crashed. It was the first confirmed act of air sabotage in commercial aviation.
March 31, 1931	8	0	0	1931 Transcontinental & Western Air Fokker F-10 crash	Bazaar Township	Kansas	Fokker F-10	The wooden wing separated from the body of the aircraft during flight due to deterioration of the glue from moisture, leading to a crash. Legendary Notre Dame head coach Knute Rockne was among those killed.
July 21, 1919	13	27	2	Wingfoot Air Express crash	Chicago	Illinois	Type FD dirigible	The aircraft caught fire and crashed, killing 3 aboard the dirigible and 10 on the ground.

== See also ==
- List of aircraft accidents and incidents resulting in at least 50 fatalities
