= Preflight checklist =

List of tasks performed prior to takeoff

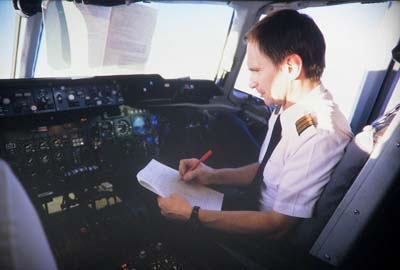
A pilot of a DC-10 consulting his checklist

In aviation, a preflight checklist is a list of tasks that should be performed by pilots and aircrew prior to takeoff. Its purpose is to improve flight safety by ensuring that no important tasks are forgotten. Failure to correctly conduct a preflight check using a checklist is a major contributing factor to aircraft accidents.

== History ==
According to researcher and writer Atul Gawande, the concept of a pre-flight checklist was first introduced by management and engineers at The Boeing Company following the 1935 crash of the prototype Boeing B-17 (then known as the Model 299) at Wright Field in Dayton, Ohio, killing both pilots. Investigation found that the pilots had forgotten to disengage the crucial gust locks (devices which stop control surfaces moving in the wind while parked) prior to take-off. Life magazine published the resulting lengthy and detailed B-17 checklist in its 24 August 1942 issue.

=== Crashes attributed to checklist failures ===
- On 26 December 1968, Pan Am Flight 799 (registration N799PA), a cargo flight in a Boeing 707-321C, crashed in Alaska immediately after departing, killing all three on board. Flaps were not in the proper takeoff position, partly as the result of distractions while following their taxi checklist. Despite the flap position being an important setting for takeoff, it did not appear on the Pan American pre-takeoff checklist.
- On 26 May 1987, a Continental Express flight, operated by Air New Orleans as flight 2962 (registration N331CY), crash landed just after takeoff from New Orleans International Airport. The plane crashed into eight lanes of traffic and subsequently injured two persons on the ground. Of the 11 occupants on board, there were zero fatalities. The NTSB cited "a breakdown of the crew coordination which resulted in their failure to comply with the Before Takeoff Checklist", noting the crewmembers' lack of experience in the BAe-3101, and that they had attempted to use procedures that would have been correct in other aircraft they had flown.
- On 16 August 1987, Northwest Airlines Flight 255, a MD-82, crashed shortly after takeoff, killing 154 of 155 on board and two on the ground. The NTSB said "the probable cause of the accident was the flightcrew's failure to use the taxi checklist".
- Following a checklist would have shown that the gust lock was engaged on the Gulfstream IV crash on May 31, 2014. The National Transportation Safety Board downloaded data from the aircraft's recorder and found it was a habit: 98% of the previous 175 takeoffs were made with incomplete flight-control checks. The National Business Aviation Association analyzed 143,756 flights in 2013-2015 by 379 business aircraft and only partial flight-control checks were done before 15.6% of the takeoffs and no checks at all on 2.03% of the flights.

== FAR 121 ==
The FAA's Federal Aviation Regulations explicitly requires a checklist for Federal Aviation Regulations, Part 121 operators (scheduled air carriers):

(a) Each certificate holder shall provide an approved cockpit check procedure for each type of aircraft.

(b) The approved procedures must include each item necessary for flight crewmembers to check for safety before starting engines, taking off, or landing, and in engine and systems emergencies. The procedures must be designed so that a flight crewmember will not need to rely upon his memory for items to be checked.

(c) The approved procedures must be readily usable in the cockpit of each aircraft and the flight crew shall follow them when operating the aircraft.
