= Dan-Air Flight 0034 =

1979 aviation accident

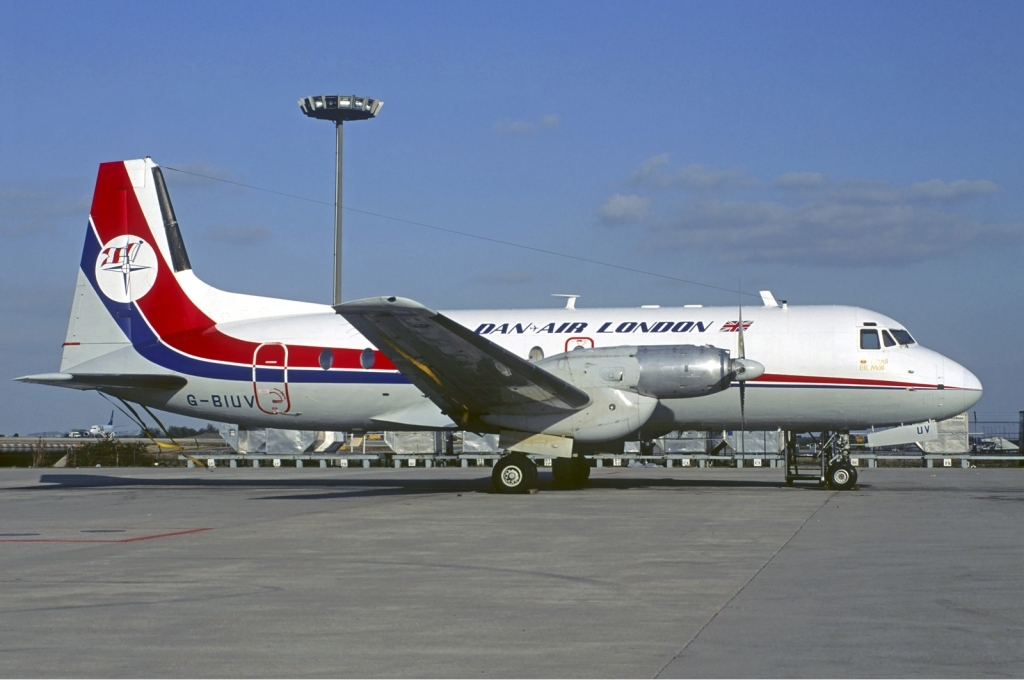
- A Dan-Air HS.748 similar to the accident aircraft

Accident
- Date: 31 July 1979
- Summary: Maintenance error (Accidental engagement of gust lock)
- Site: Sumburgh Airport; 59.8820°N 1.2848°W

Aircraft
- Aircraft type: Hawker Siddeley HS.748-105 series 1
- Operator: Dan-Air Services Ltd
- Call sign: DAN-AIR 0034
- Registration: G-BEKF
- Flight origin: Sumburgh Airport
- Destination: Aberdeen Airport
- Occupants: 47
- Passengers: 44
- Crew: 3
- Fatalities: 17
- Survivors: 30

Dan-Air Flight 0034 was a fatal accident involving a Hawker Siddeley HS 748 series 1 turboprop aircraft operated by Dan-Air Services Limited on an oil industry charter flight from Sumburgh Airport, Shetland Islands, to Aberdeen Airport.

The crash, which occurred on 31 July 1979 50 m (160 ft) offshore following the aircraft's failure to take off, resulted in the aircraft's destruction and 17 deaths of 47 on board (15 of 44 passengers and both pilots).

== The aircraft ==
The aircraft, operated by Dan-Air Services Ltd, was a Hawker Siddeley HS 748-105 Series 1 (Note: The aircraft was an Avro 748 Series 1; Avro, like Boeing, assigned a unique code for each user that bought one of these aircraft, which in this case was '105', signifying that this aircraft was built for Aerolineas Argentinas.) with aircraft registration G-BEKF, that had its first flight in 1962. It entered service with Aerolíneas Argentinas the same year and was subsequently operated by Argentinian state-owned oil company Yacimientos Petrolíferos Fiscales (YPF). It was one of seven Hawker Siddeley HS 748 series 1 aircraft Dan-Air acquired from YPF for oil industry support work in the North Sea in 1977. At the time of the accident, it had flown 29,007 hours.

== Accident ==
G-BEKF was engaged on regular charter flights between Aberdeen and Sumburgh, carrying oil company personnel. The inbound flight to Sumburgh was made without incident and the crew had a seven-hour stopover before making the return flight to Aberdeen, Dan-Air 0034, with 44 passengers on board.

When flight 0034 was cleared for takeoff from runway 09 at 15:59 hours, the engines were accelerated while the aircraft was held back by its brakes. The takeoff run commenced at exactly 16:00 hours. Evidence later retrieved from the aircraft's flight data recorder showed that it accelerated normally through the V_{1} decision speed of 92 kn (170 km/h; 106 mph), to its V_{2} takeoff safety speed of 99 kn (183 km/h; 114 mph). However, no rotation was carried out even though the aircraft significantly exceeded its V_{R} vertical rotation speed of 113 kn (209 km/h; 130 mph).

About five seconds after reaching the scheduled rotation speed, the aircraft began to decelerate. It then crossed the airport perimeter road and passed over the inclined sea defences, losing its undercarriage, port wing and breaking its fuselage in two in the process. The aircraft came to rest on the surface of the sea, approximately 50 m (160 ft) from the shoreline, sinking nose first after two to three minutes, in approximately 10 m (33 ft) of water. Elizabeth Cowe, the sole flight attendant, was among the 30 survivors. She assisted in the rescue of 26 of the 29 surviving passengers, which earned her an MBE in recognition of her bravery. However, adverse weather conditions hampered rescue attempts mounted by boat and helicopter, and they were unable to prevent the remaining 15 passengers' and both pilots' deaths by drowning.

== Investigation ==
The accident was notified by Sumburgh Air Traffic Control at 17:30 hours on 31 July 1979. The Air Accidents Investigation Branch (AAIB) commenced their investigation the following morning.

The entire wreckage was salvaged and removed for a detailed examination, which needed to take into account the additional damage that had resulted from the action of the sea and the salvage operation. Both engines were stripped down and examined, but no evidence of pre-impact failure was found. The propeller control units were tested and were discovered to perform within specification. No evidence of fire, smoke, or overheating was found.

Although the compass selector was discovered to have been switched to the co-pilot's instrument, it was not established which pilot handled the takeoff (company regulations stated that the commander should perform this if the co-pilot was inexperienced). It was however considered possible that it had been moved during evacuation or salvage.

=== Cause ===
The AAIB investigation concluded that the accident was caused by the locked condition of the aircraft's elevators which prevented the aircraft rotating into a flying attitude. It was thought likely that the elevator gust lock became re-engaged during the pilots' pre-takeoff checks, and that it was not noticed until the takeoff was so far advanced that a successful abandonment within the overrun area could not be made. The re-engagement of the gust lock was made possible by the condition of the gust lock lever gate plate and gate-stop strip, to which non-standard repairs had been made.

=== Safety recommendations ===
The AAIB made nine recommendations:

- That the gust lock system be redesigned to ensure positive operation at all times and avoid misleading the crew as to the position of any lock.
- That cockpit voice recorders be fitted to all public transport aircraft over 11,400 kg (25,100 lb) maximum weight.
- That the authorities of airports with runways facing out to sea liaise with the Department of Trade through HM Coastguard to agree procedures for close offshore rescue.
- That aerodromes operated by the Civil Aviation Authority (CAA) be licensed as per the [same] requirements for other aerodromes.
- That the CAA Publication 168 Licensing of Aerodromes be reviewed in the interests of upgrading its listed safety margins.
- That the CAA reconsider the possibility of supplying some kind of retardation device in or beyond the overrun areas at critical aerodromes.
- Demonstrations of how to don and operate lifejackets be required, and individual safety leaflets be provided on all public transport flights which takeoff or land over water.
- Lifejacket stowage in HS 748 and aircraft with similar arrangements be repositioned to improve accessibility.
- A suitable launching device for lifelines be devised and supplied to coastal aerodromes.
- Where not already provided, loudhailers be included in the emergency equipment at all aerodromes of Category VI and above.
