= Hanscom Field =

Airport in Massachusetts, United States of America

Laurence G. Hanscom Field

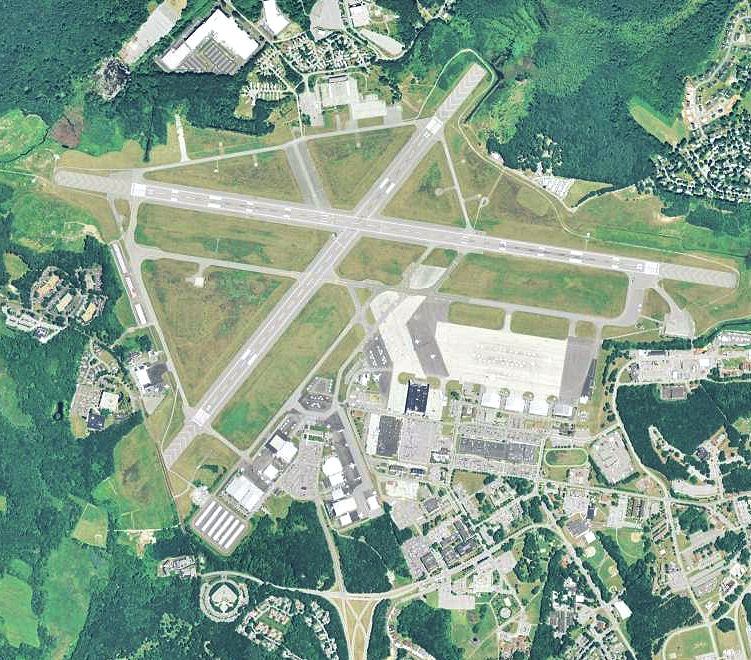
- USGS 2006 orthophoto
- IATA: BED; ICAO: KBED; FAA LID: BED

Summary
- Airport type: Public / military
- Operator: Massachusetts Port Authority (Massport)
- Location: Bedford, Massachusetts
- Opened: June 26, 1941 (85 years ago)
- Time zone: EST (UTC-05:00:00)
  - Summer (DST): EDT (UTC-04:00:00)
- Elevation AMSL: 132 ft (40 m)
- Coordinates: 42°28′12″N 071°17′20″W
- Website: www.hanscomfield.com

Maps
- FAA airport diagram as of January 2021
- Interactive map of Laurence G. Hanscom Field

Runways
Direction	Length		Surface
Direction	ft	m	Surface
5/23	5,107	1,557	Asphalt
11/29	7,011	2,137	Asphalt

Statistics
- Aircraft operations (2021): 99,961
- Based aircraft (2022): 252
- Source: Federal Aviation Administration

Laurence G. Hanscom Field (IATA: BED, ICAO: KBED, FAA LID: BED), commonly known as Hanscom Field, is a public use airport operated by the Massachusetts Port Authority, located 14 mi (12 nmi; 23 km) outside Boston in Bedford, Massachusetts, United States.

Hanscom is mainly a general-aviation airport, the largest in New England. Both runways can accommodate jets, and are used by Hanscom Air Force Base, a defense-research facility next to Hanscom Field. It is a popular training airport, with more than 40 rental aircraft on the field. The Civil Air Terminal building hosts two flight schools. Transient general aviation planes are served by three FBOs: Jet Aviation, Atlantic Aviation and Signature Aviation.

The airport has also run limited regional passenger and cargo flights, and is used sometimes by the Boston Bruins, Boston Celtics and Boston Red Sox, instead of Logan International Airport, for their charter flights to and from away contests.

Federal Aviation Administration records say the airport had 10,956 passenger boardings (enplanements) in calendar year 2017. It is in the National Plan of Integrated Airport Systems for 2021–2025, in which the FAA categories it as a non-primary commercial service airport (between 2,500 and 10,000 enplanements per year).

The field serves aircraft from Piper Cubs to Gulfstream V jets. The events of September 11 caused a number of changes to general aviation in the US (see Airport security repercussions due to the September 11 attacks). Hanscom Field saw changes implemented by Massport that included security fees, identification cards, and a requirement for propeller locks.

== Facilities and aircraft ==
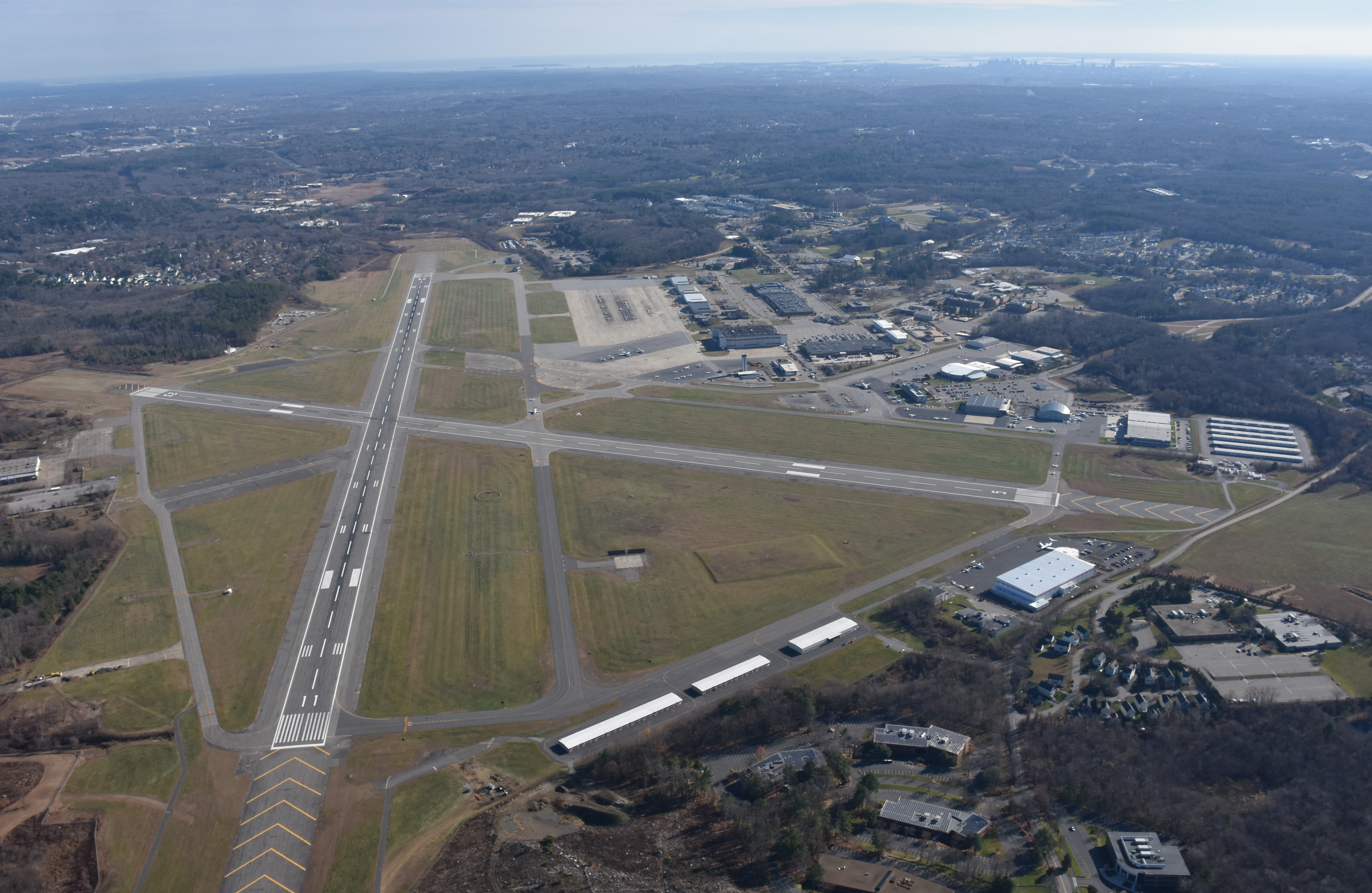
2015 aerial view of Hanscom Field

Hanscom Field covers 1,125 acres (455 ha; 4.55 km^{2}) at an elevation of 132 ft (40 m) above mean sea level.

It has two asphalt runways:

- Runway 11/29 is 7,011 ft × 150 ft (2,137 m × 46 m)
- Runway 5/23 is 5,107 ft × 150 ft (1,557 m × 46 m)

In the year ending September 30, 2021 the airport had 99,961 aircraft operations, an average of 274 per day: 81% general aviation, 18% air taxi, less than 1% military and less than 1% scheduled commercial. In April 2022, there were 252 aircraft based at this airport: 146 single-engine, 20 multi-engine, 75 jet and 11 helicopter.

In 2008, and many years prior, Hanscom had handled the second-most aircraft movements of any airport in New England, after Logan International Airport.

Hanscom Field's traffic is primarily private jets and general aviation aircraft. The airport is served by a FAA control tower, which operates between the hours of 7:00 am (-05:00) to 11:00 pm (-05:00). Massport assesses a nighttime field use fee for takeoffs or landings conducted outside of the tower operating hours.

== Airlines and destinations ==
Under Massport regulations adopted in 1980 (Part F of the General Rules and Regulations for Laurence G. Hanscom Field), scheduled commercial operations are limited to aircraft with up to 60 seats.

Shuttle America, a Connecticut-based regional airline, operated scheduled service from the airfield from 1999 until 2004, carrying more than 10,000 passengers each month to Buffalo, New York; Hartford, Connecticut; New York LaGuardia; Trenton, New Jersey; and Greensboro, North Carolina, using De Havilland Dash 8-300 aircraft. In 2001 Shuttle America became a US Airways Express feeder carrier on behalf of US Airways providing service to Philadelphia and Trenton until service ended in 2004. De Havilland Dash 8 and Saab 340 aircraft were used in the latter years.

Boston-Maine Airways, dba Pan Am Clipper Connection began servicing the airport in 2002 using Jetstream 31 aircraft. Clipper flights connected Hanscom Field with Pease Airport in Portsmouth, New Hampshire, and Trenton–Mercer Airport in New Jersey. In its final years, Clipper added flights from Hanscom to Ithaca-Tompkins Regional Airport in Central New York. Even with this new route, Clipper could never draw the numbers it needed to remain profitable. The airline was forced to cease operation in 2008 by the FAA for lack of funding and management. That left Hanscom Field without scheduled airline service for the first time in a decade.

In 2011, Trenton-based airline Streamline Air began its first public charter route to Hanscom using 30-seat Embraer EMB 120 Brasilia aircraft, beginning with two daily round trips on weekdays. Streamline ceased operations on September 15, 2012.

In the spring of 2021, Southern Airways Express announced that they were replacing their Hyannis-Nantucket route with a Bedford/Hanscom Field-Nantucket route beginning May 26, 2021. This was the first scheduled passenger service out of Hanscom Field in almost a decade.

=== Cargo ===
Airlines	Destinations	Refs
AirNet	Baltimore-Martin State, Buffalo, Cleveland–Cuyahoga, Cincinnati, St. Louis–Spirit	

== ICE enforcement flights at Hanscom Field ==
The US government has used Hanscom Field for detainee flights since at least 2014. Activity for all immigration enforcements has stepped up significantly in 2025 and 2026 according to Human Rights First, a non-profit that hosts an interactive dashboard of ICE transports. They document 127 enforcement flights from Hanscom in 2025 and 119 in 2026 through the end of October. Many of these flights are considered "shuffle flights" in that detainees are transported from Hanscom, sometimes to multiple detention locations within the United States. It has been difficult to ascertain the full scope of ICE operations at Hanscom, including ascertaining the exact number of detainees who have been transported from the region via ICE aircraft and what their destinations are.

A De-ICE Hanscom sign erected during a protest outside the entry to the airfield.

ICE operations at Hanscom have been a focal point for protests about the treatment of detainees beginning in 2025. De-ICE Hanscom is a group that describes itself as "a coalition organizing peaceful standouts with the goal of eliminating ICE transport flights from Hanscom Field." They claim "ICE is using these flights to swiftly move immigrants out of New England in order to hinder effective legal representation." Members of the coalition hold weekly standouts outside the entrance to the airfield to build local awareness of ICE activity.

Another group called De-ICE Signature Aviation focuses on Signature Aviation, an international fixed-base operator which provides ground services and fueling to private jet and charter companies at Hanscom. They have been targeted by activists because they service aircraft used by ICE for moving detainees out of the region. They have organized bus tours to Hanscom to build awareness along the route and at the airfield of ICE operations.

== Notable events at Hanscom Field ==
In September 1964, The Beatles arrived at Hanscom Field aboard a chartered aircraft during one of their American concert tours. They were making an appearance at Boston Garden the following day. It was felt that the immense popularity of the British singing group would cause congestion at Logan, so this alternative airport was selected.

On 24 November 1988, George Koskotas, who fled Greece after being indicted on five counts of forgery and embezzlement for the Koskotas scandal, was apprehended by the FBI at Hanscom Field after landing in a private jet with his family.

== Accidents and incidents ==
On 8 August 1962, a U.S. Air Force Boeing KC-135 Stratotanker, a modified former tanker, crashed on approach to Hanscom Field's runway 11, destroying the aircraft and killing all three members of the flight crew.

On 31 May 2014, a private Gulfstream IV business jet crashed and caught fire beyond the end of runway 11 following an aborted take off from Hanscom Field, killing all seven people on board. A preliminary NTSB report suggests that the flight controls were locked, preventing the aircraft from rotating to take off. Lewis Katz, co-owner of the Philadelphia Inquirer, the Philadelphia Daily News and Philly.com, was among the dead.

=== Movies/scenes filmed at Hanscom Field ===
- What's The Worst That Could Happen? (2001)
- The Pink Panther 2 (2009)
- Paul Blart: Mall Cop (2009)
- Edge of Darkness (2010)

== See also ==
- List of airports in Massachusetts
