= Joe Taub =

American businessman, philanthropist (1929–2017)

- Born: Joseph Albert Taub; May 29, 1929; Paterson, New Jersey, U.S.
- Died: October 27, 2017 (aged 88); New York City, New York, U.S.
- Education: Rutgers University (attended)
- Occupations: Businessman; philanthropist; sports owner
- Known for: Co-Owner of the New Jersey Nets
- Spouse: Arlene Gorelick
- Children: 3

Joseph Albert Taub (May 29, 1929 – October 27, 2017) was an American businessman, philanthropist and sports owner. Born in Paterson, New Jersey, he joined his brother Henry Taub and Frank Lautenberg in building the payroll company Automatic Data Processing. After retiring from the business in 1969, he became a philanthropist who developed youth programs in his hometown of Paterson.

In 1978, Taub was part of an investment group that acquired the New Jersey Nets, which had been in financial difficulty. Taub, for a time, served as the principal owner and president of the team, and sold his ownership stake in 1985. In 1991, he re-joined the team's ownership, taking a prominent public role until selling the majority of his stake in 1998.

== Biography ==
Taub was born on May 29, 1929, in Paterson, New Jersey, to Morris Taub and Sylvia Sievitz, both Jewish immigrants from Poland. Taub was raised in Paterson and attended Eastside High School. He later attended Rutgers University.

=== Business career ===
Joseph's older brother, Henry, founded ADP in 1949. Henry later brought Joe into the company along with future United States Senator Frank Lautenberg to help manage the company's operations and sales. In 1961, the trio took the company public with an initial offering on 100,000 shares priced at $3.00 each.

Taub retired in 1969 at the age of 40 to pursue his philanthropic interests. Over the years, he established scholarships for underprivileged youths, funded a museum of Paterson's history and founded a youth basketball league with former Major League Baseball player, Larry Doby, a Paterson native and fellow East Side alumnus.

=== New Jersey Nets ===
Taub, who had a longstanding interest in sports, partnered with attorney Alan Cohen, to invest in a franchise. In 1970, the pair bid unsuccessfully for the New York Jets. He and Cohen eventually put together a consortium of nine investors to acquire the Nets, which under their then-owner, Roy Boe, were financially troubled. The team had amassed debts of $19 million and had lost a judgment of $4.2 million to Cablevision.

In 1981, the Nets hired Larry Brown as coach. Brown led the team to a 91–67 record in two seasons with the Nets. In 1983, after discovering that Brown interviewed at the University of Kansas without asking for permission, Taub fired Brown at Newark International Airport with six games left in the season.

In 1985, Taub sold his interest in the team, citing frustration with the inability to turn a sports franchise around the way one could a business. He stayed away only six years before repurchasing an interest in the team in 1991.

In 1996, Taub emerged as an influential voice for the team when his brother Henry took over the club. A friend of coach Rick Pitino, Joe attempted to lure Pitino to the Nets with a reported offer worth $30 million. Pitino spurned the team to stay at the Kentucky Wildcats men's basketball.

The Nets ownership sold the team to Lewis Katz and Ray Chambers for $150 million. Taub retained a small interest in the team.

Taub died October 27, 2017, at the age of 88.

Sporting positions
| Preceded by Roy Boe | New Jersey Nets principal owner 1978–1998; Served alongside: Alan N. Cohen | Succeeded by Raymond Chambers; Lewis Katz |
