= Unstable approach =

Aircraft does not maintain certain flight parameters

An unstable approach is an approach for landing during which an aircraft does not maintain certain essential flight parameters within reasonable limits. This usually includes at least one of the following variables stable: speed, descent rate, vertical/lateral flight path and in landing configuration, or receive a landing clearance by a certain altitude. Unstabilized approaches account for most approach and landing accidents. For this reason, an approach should be stabilized by 1,000 feet (305 m) above runway altitude. Otherwise, a go-around should be executed by the pilot.

For example, the 2016 Magdalen Islands Mitsubishi MU-2 crash was blamed on an unstabilized approach.

== See also ==
- Index of aviation articles
