= Lewis Katz =

American lawyer

- Born: January 11, 1942; Camden, New Jersey, US
- Died: May 31, 2014 (aged 72); Bedford, Massachusetts, US
- Resting place: Crescent Memorial Park Cemetery, Pennsauken, New Jersey, U.S.
- Occupations: Businessman; Sports team owner Newspaper owner
- Known for: Co-owner of the New Jersey Devils; Co-owner of the New Jersey Nets; Co-owner of The Philadelphia Inquirer

Lewis Katz (/kæts/; January 11, 1942 – May 31, 2014) was an American businessman, philanthropist, and newspaper publisher, who was a co-owner of The Philadelphia Inquirer.

== Early life ==
Katz was born to a Jewish family in Camden, New Jersey, on January 11, 1942, and grew up in the Parkside section of the city. He was raised along with his sister, Sandra Katz (Wolff) by their mother, a secretary at RCA, after their father died when they were very young.

== Career ==
Katz became a lawyer and businessman, making millions in parking lots, billboards and sports. Katz was a former owner of Kinney Parking Systems, at the time the largest parking company in New York City, and the former chairman of Interstate Outdoor Advertising, one of the largest regional outdoor-advertising firms in the country. He was the majority owner of five radio stations in Atlantic and Cape May counties at the Jersey Shore, and a founding partner of the law firm Katz, Ettin & Levine in Cherry Hill.

=== Sports ownership ===
Katz invested in the two New Jersey sports teams back in 2000. He was part of the YankeeNets/Puck Holdings group along with Ray Chambers. The group purchased the New Jersey Devils from their original owner Dr. John McMullen.

Katz's ownership involvement of both teams ended in 2003 when the YankeeNets group disintegrated with the Devils being sold to Jeffrey Vanderbeek and the Nets sold to Bruce Ratner. The Devils have since been sold again while the Nets were also sold and moved to Brooklyn.

=== Philanthropy ===
Katz was the director of the Katz Foundation, which supports charitable, educational and medical causes. To support pioneering medical research, Katz established an annual prize and endowed a visiting professorship in cardiovascular research at Columbia University, where he served on the board of visitors of the medical school. His $15 million gift to The Dickinson Schools of Law of The Pennsylvania State University helped fund the renovation of historic Trickett Hall at Dickinson Law in Carlisle, PA, and fund the development of a law school building for Penn State Law in University Park, PA, both of which bear his name. As a native of Camden, New Jersey, Katz established several programs to help Camden children. Katz donated to Jewish organizations, focused on young Jewish entrepreneurs. Katz was a donor to the Jewish Federation of Southern New Jersey, Congregation Beth El in Voorhees, New Jersey, and the National Museum of American Jewish History. On October 13, 2015, Temple University's medical school was dedicated as the Lewis Katz School of Medicine.

== Personal life and death ==
In 1966, Katz married Marjorie Nemarow; they had a son, Drew Katz, and a daughter, Melissa Katz. His wife died in 2013, approximately five months before Katz's own death.

On May 31, 2014, Katz and six others died when a chartered airplane crashed on takeoff at Hanscom Field and burst into flames. An FAA spokesperson said that the Gulfstream IV business jet apparently ran off Runway 11 as the aircraft was departing for Atlantic City, New Jersey, failing to become airborne because the gust lock was left engaged.

Sporting positions
Preceded by Joe Taub; Alan Cohen	New Jersey Nets owner 1998–1999	Succeeded by George Steinbrenner
