= 2014 Bedford Gulfstream IV crash =

Aircraft accident in Massachusetts, U.S.

2014 Bedford/Lexington Gulfstream IV crash
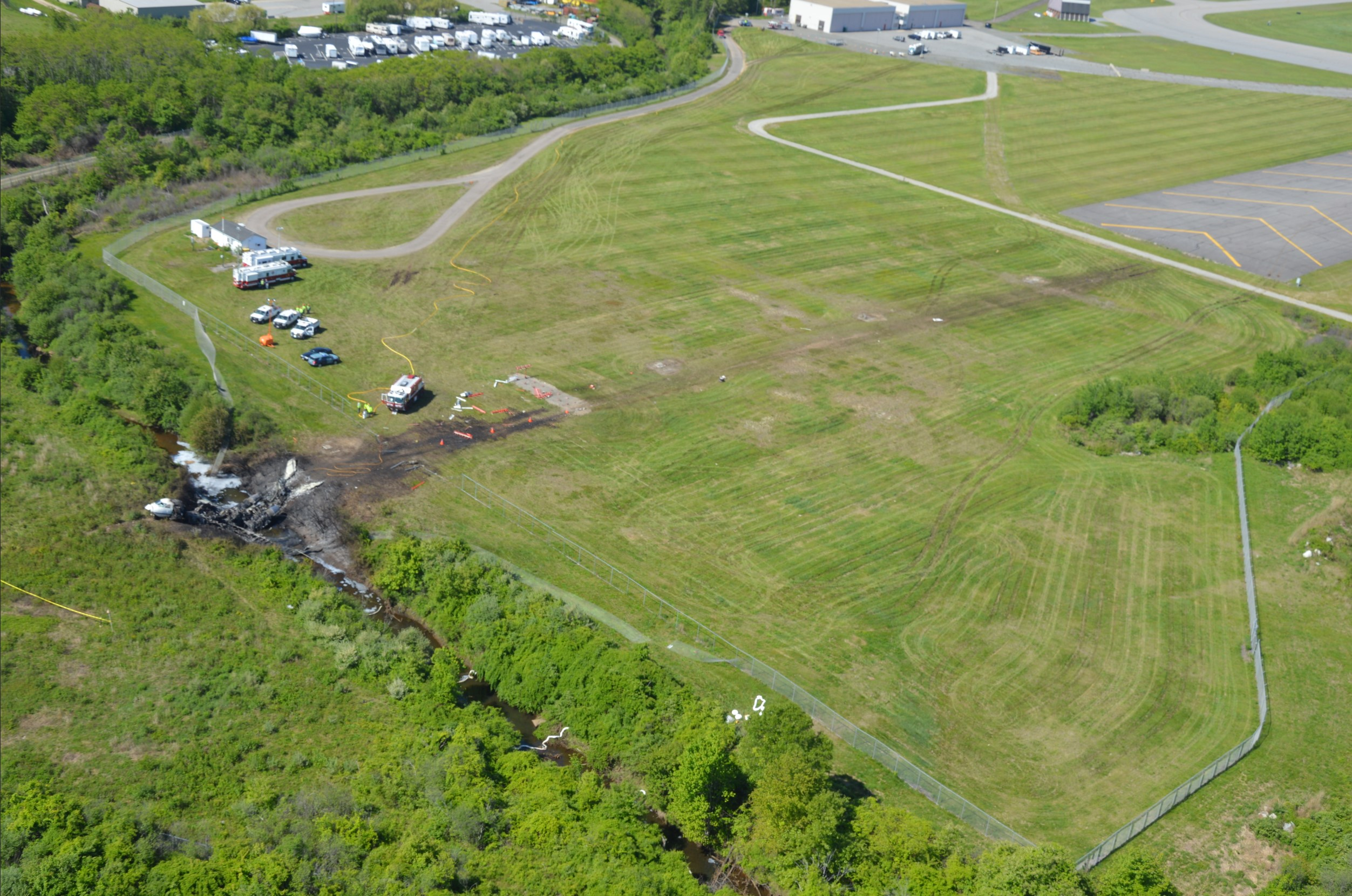
- Overview of the accident site

Accident
- Date: 31 May 2014
- Summary: Attempted takeoff with gust lock engaged due to pilot error, resulting in runway overrun
- Site: Laurence G. Hanscom Field, Bedford, Massachusetts; 42°28′08″N 71°16′04″W

Aircraft
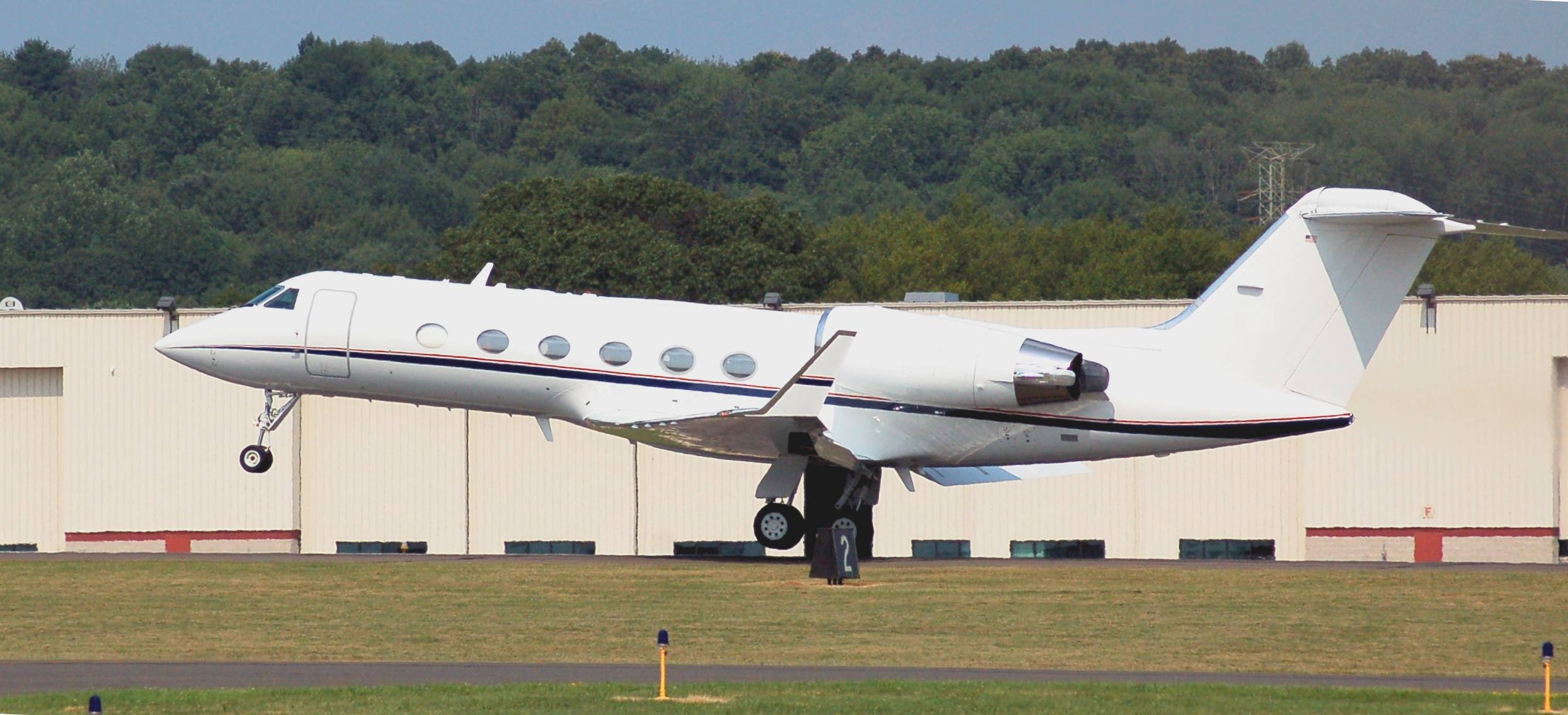
- A Gulfstream IV similar to the accident aircraft
- Aircraft type: Gulfstream Aerospace Corporation G-IV
- Operator: Arizin Ventures, LLC
- Registration: N121JM
- Flight origin: Laurence G. Hanscom Field, Bedford, Massachusetts
- Destination: Atlantic City International Airport, Atlantic City, New Jersey
- Occupants: 7
- Passengers: 4
- Crew: 3
- Fatalities: 7
- Survivors: 0

American millionaire philanthropist Lewis Katz and six others were killed in a Gulfstream IV crash in Bedford, Massachusetts, on 31 May 2014. Katz, the co-owner of The Philadelphia Inquirer and several major sports teams, had chartered the twinjet for a day trip from Atlantic City, New Jersey, to Concord, Massachusetts. In addition to several personal friends, he had also invited Edward G. Rendell, a former governor of Pennsylvania, who was unable to accept.

The flight crew consisted of pilot-in-command James McDowell, of Georgetown, Delaware; co-pilot Bauke "Mike" de Vries, of Marlton, New Jersey; and flight attendant Teresa Anne Benhoff, of Easton, Maryland. The pilots attempted to take off with the airplane's gust lock inadvertently engaged, which resulted in the plane overrunning the runway and crashing into a ravine. All seven occupants of the plane were killed.

== Accident ==
After concluding his business in Concord, Katz and his party returned to Hanscom Field in Bedford and boarded the airplane. The airplane prepared to depart at 9:40 pm EDT, lining up on runway 11 under night visual meteorological conditions. As it began its takeoff roll, the pilots realized that they had limited steering control and that the engine throttle levers could not be advanced to full power. The plane passed V_{1}, the maximum speed at which the pilots could have aborted takeoff, but they failed to apply the brakes for about ten seconds or reduce the throttles for another four seconds after the crew realized there was a problem. The airplane rolled through the paved overrun area and across a grassy area, collided with approach lights and a localizer antenna, passed through the airport's perimeter fence, and came to a stop in a shallow ravine formed by the Shawsheen River, where its full load of fuel immediately caught fire. All seven people aboard were killed, and the airframe was destroyed by the impact and post-crash fire.

== Investigation ==
The National Transportation Safety Board (NTSB) issued its final report on 9 September 2015. The NTSB found that the flight crew failed to adhere to required pre-flight procedures. Critically, the pilots failed to conduct a flight control check, which would have revealed that the airplane's "gust lock" system, which protects the elevator, ailerons, and rudder from wind gusts while the airplane is parked by locking them in place, was still fully engaged and prevented use of those control surfaces. A review of data from the airplane's quick access recorder revealed that the pilots had neglected to perform complete flight control checks before 98 percent of their previous 175 takeoffs in the airplane, indicating that this oversight was habitual and not an exceptional event.

The gust lock handle also included an interlock mechanism intended to limit the throttle levers to just enough power for taxiing and idle while engaged. According to Gulfstream, this had been intended to prevent pilots from attempting to take off with the gust lock engaged. However, post-accident testing on other Gulfstream-IV airplanes found that, with the gust lock handle in the ON position, the forward throttle lever movement that could be achieved was three to four times greater than intended.

The NTSB concluded that the probable cause of the accident was the flight crew's failure to perform the flight control check before takeoff, which led to their attempt to take off with the gust lock system engaged, and their delay in aborting the takeoff after they became aware that the controls were locked. The NTSB also cited as contributing factors the flight crew's habitual noncompliance with checklists, Gulfstream's failure to ensure that the Gulfstream-IV gust lock / throttle lever interlock system would prevent an attempted takeoff with the gust lock engaged, and the Federal Aviation Administration's failure to detect this defect during the Gulfstream IV's airworthiness certification.

== Aftermath ==
Following the accident, the FAA issued an Airworthiness Directive that gave operators three years to retrofit the gust lock systems on their Gulfstream-IV jets, and Gulfstream immediately announced that it would redesign the gust lock system. The families of Katz and the pilots later filed wrongful-death lawsuits against the manufacturer.
