= Gust lock =

Mechanism that locks control surfaces

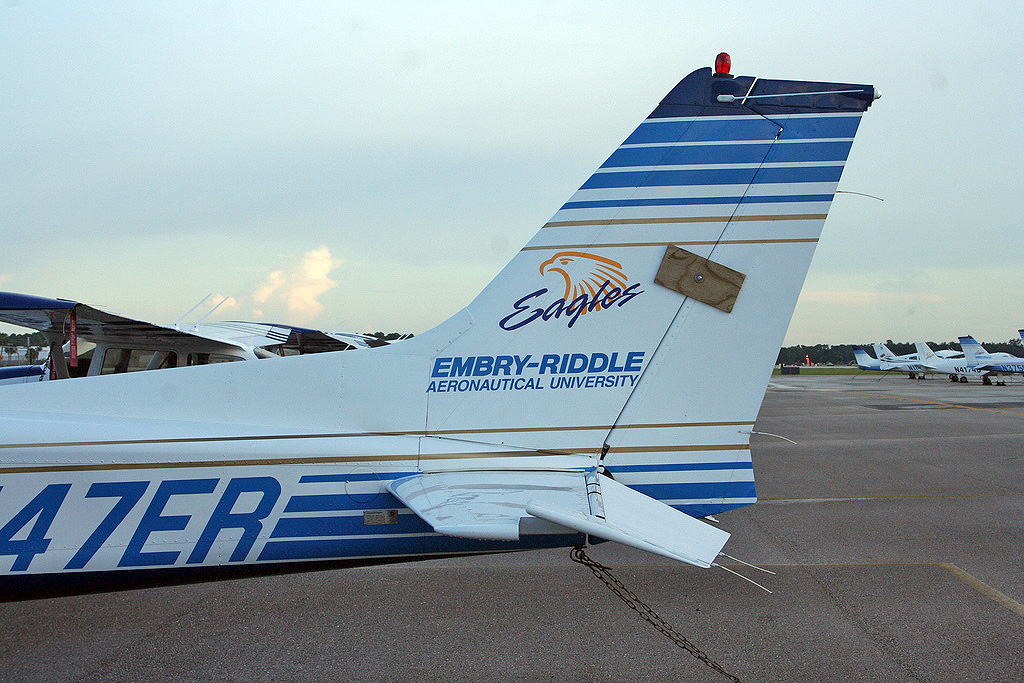
Gust lock on a rudder.

A gust lock on an aircraft is a mechanism that locks control surfaces and keeps open aircraft doors in place while the aircraft is parked on the ground and non-operational. Gust locks prevent wind from causing unexpected movements of the control surfaces and their linked controls inside the aircraft, as well as aircraft doors on some aircraft; otherwise, wind gusts could cause possible damage to the control surfaces and systems, or to nearby people, cargo, or machinery. Some gust locks are external devices attached directly to the aircraft's control surfaces, while others are attached to the relevant flight controls inside the cockpit.

== Safety ==
A gust lock can pose a serious safety hazard if it is not disengaged before an aircraft's takeoff, because it renders the flight control inoperative. Many internal gust locks have a safety feature that locks out the aircraft's throttle or engine-start controls until removed and stowed. External-only gust locks typically lack this safety feature, and must be tagged with a large red remove before flight streamer.

=== Crashes ===
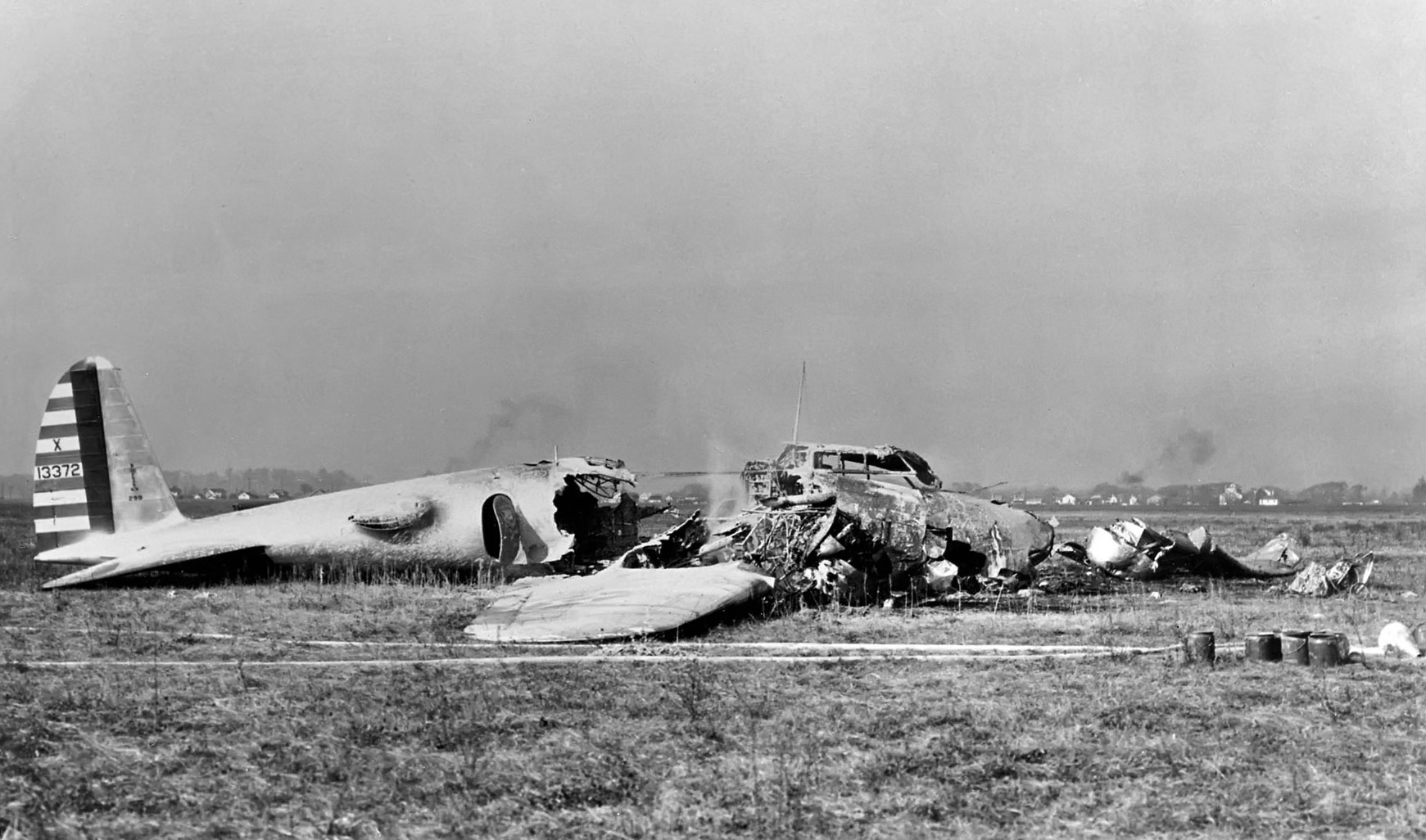
The prototype of the B-17 crashed on October 30, 1935

The first Boeing B-17 Flying Fortress ever built, the initial Model 299 aircraft, was lost in just this way on October 30, 1935, when its gust locks were left engaged, with the resulting crash killing Boeing chief test pilot Leslie Tower and United States Army Air Corps test pilot Ployer Peter Hill.

Less than a year later, German Luftwaffe Generalleutnant Walter Wever lost his life in a similar accident from gust lock neglect, when his Heinkel He 70 Blitz monoplane crashed on June 3, 1936, from the Blitz's aileron gust locks not being disengaged before takeoff.

Prince Gustaf Adolf of Sweden, the American singer and actress Grace Moore and 20 others were killed in 1947 during the crash of a KLM flight at Copenhagen Airport due to the flight crew forgetting to disengage the gust lock on the elevators of the aircraft.

In 1977 the crash of Air Indiana Flight 216 occurred due to failure to remove the gust locks.

A C-124 transport carrying US servicemen home for Christmas crashed in 1952 due to engagement of gust locks.

On December 5, 1978, Douglas C-53 N25656 of Caribe Air Sales crashed shortly after take-off from Sebring Regional Airport and was destroyed by fire. The gust locks had not been removed before flight and the aircraft was overloaded. All three people on board were killed.

Dan-Air Flight 0034, a Hawker Siddeley 748 series 1 (registration G-BEKF) operating an oil industry support flight crashed on July 31, 1979 at Sumburgh Airport in the Shetland Islands. The aircraft failed to become airborne, ran through the perimeter fence, and crashed into the sea. The accident was due to the elevator gust lock having become re-engaged, preventing the aircraft from rotating into a flying attitude. The aircraft was destroyed and 17 of the 47 people on board drowned.

On August 27, 1992, at Gimli Industrial Park Airport, a modified version of the DHC-4 Caribou crashed due to a design flaw which permitted the gust-locks to engage during take-off.

On May 31, 2014, a gust lock left in place caused the crash of a Gulfstream IV at Hanscom Field, killing Philadelphia Inquirer co-owner Lewis Katz as well as six others.

On July 24, 2021, in Lewiston, Idaho, former Naval Aviator and F-14 Tomcat pilot Dale Snodgrass was killed when the plane he was piloting crashed due to loss of control on takeoff caused by the gust lock not being removed before the flight.

== See also ==
- Remove before flight
- Lists of aviation topics
- List of aviation, avionics, aerospace and aeronautical abbreviations
