= 1935 in aviation =

This is a list of aviation-related events from 1935:

== Events ==
- Employing aerial refueling, a sustained flight record of 653 hours 34 minutes (27 days, 5 hours, 34 minutes) is set by brothers Al and Fred Key of Meridian, Mississippi. It remains unbroken.
- Consolidated Aircraft Corporation moves from Buffalo, New York, to San Diego, California.
- Imperial Japanese Navy dive bombers practice against a full-size mock-up of the United States Navy aircraft carrier Saratoga (CV-3) at the Kashima bombing range.
- Pan American World Airways builds a seaplane base for its transpacific China Clipper flying boats on Sand Island at Midway Atoll.
- The Soviet Union has the largest bomber force in the world.
- The Kalinin K-7 programme ends with the construction of only one K-7, which had been lost in 1933. The end of the programme brings the cancellation of the construction of two additional K-7s.
- The United States Army places a rotary-wing aircraft in service for the first time when it purchases a Kellet KD-1 autogiro for evaluation. The autogiro is designated the YG-1 in U.S. Army service.
- Approximately 20 cities in the United States have established radio control of airport traffic. The first — Cleveland Municipal Airport (the future Cleveland Hopkins International Airport) in Cleveland, Ohio — had done so in 1930.

=== January ===
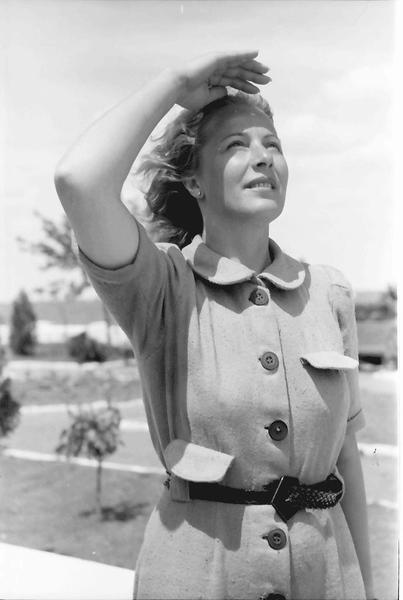
Romanian pilot Irina Burnaia.

- Helen Richey begins flying as a first officer for Pennsylvania Central Airlines. Operating a Ford Tri-Motor between Washington, D.C., and Detroit, Michigan, via Pittsburgh, Pennsylvania, and Cleveland, Ohio, she is the first female pilot for a regularly scheduled commercial airline.
- January 1 – In accordance with the Air Mail Act of 1934, it becomes illegal in the United States for an airline with an air mail contract to own any other aviation enterprise, or for any other aviation enterprise to own an air line with an airmail contract, with the exception that both airlines and other aviation enterprises still may own airfields. The most significant practical effect of the legislation is that aircraft manufacturers no longer may own airlines and vice versa.
- January 3 – As a part of the Romanian air tours over Africa, Irina Burnaia starts her journey from Bucharest, Romania, to Lake Victoria in Africa piloting an IAR-22.
- January 11–12 – Amelia Earhart makes the first solo flight from Hawaii to North America, flying from Honolulu to Oakland, California, in 18 hours 15 minutes. It is also the first solo flight across any portion of the Pacific Ocean.
- January 15 – United States Army Air Corps Major James Doolittle establishes a record for a transport flight across the United States, from Los Angeles to Newark, New Jersey, in 11 hours 59 minutes.
- January 26 – During a mail flight, the Hillman's Airways de Havilland Dragon Rapide G-ACPO crashes in bad weather at Derbyhaven on the Isle of Man.
- January 29 – With parachutist Edith Clark aboard as a passenger, pilot Madeleine Charnaux climbs to 6,115 metres (20,062 feet), setting an altitude record for light aircraft.
- January 31 – During a scheduled passenger flight from Moscow in the Soviet Union to Berlin, Germany, the Deruluft Junkers Ju 52/3mge D-AREN crashes into a hill in fog and rain, killing all 11 people on board.

=== February ===
- February 3 – The German aircraft designer Hugo Junkers dies
- February 12 – The U.S. Navy rigid airship USS Macon (ZRS-5) crashes and sinks in the Pacific Ocean off Point Sur, California. Two of her crewmen die.
- February 21 – Sisters Jane and Elizabeth Du Bois, daughters of the American consul at Naples, Italy, Coert du Bois, force open the door of a Hillman Airways de Havilland Dragon Rapide airliner in flight and jump to their deaths. Both women had been engaged to be married to pilots killed in the crash of a Royal Air Force flying boat off Sicily on February 15.
- February 22
  - It becomes illegal for airplanes to fly over the White House in Washington, D.C. President Franklin D. Roosevelt's complaint that aircraft disturb his sleep prompts the new law.
  - Leland Andrews breaks Doolittle's January record, completing a transcontinental transport flight across the United States in 11 hours 34 minutes.
  - Wiley Post takes off from Burbank, California, to begin his first attempt to make the "First Air Mail Stratosphere Flight" over U.S. Air Mail Route #2 (AM-2) from Los Angeles, California, to New York City and set a speed record for a flight across the continental United States. Mechanical problems force him to land his Lockheed 5C Vega Winnie Mae at Muroc Dry Lakein the Mojave Desert after a flight of only 57 miles (50 nmi; 92 km). An inspection reveals that a mechanic had sabotaged the flight by placing emery dust in the air inlet of the plane's supercharger at the request of a disgruntled pilot, causing the engine to ingest a U.S. quart (0.8 imp qt; 0.95 liter) of the dust.
- February 26
  - In Germany, Adolf Hitler orders Hermann Göring to secretly establish the Luftwaffe, violating the provision of the Treaty of Versailles of 1919 that Germany never again possess armed aircraft.
  - Robert Watson-Watt and Arnold Wilkins first demonstrate the reflection of radio waves from an aircraft, near Daventry in England; on June 17, the first radio detection of an aircraft by ground-based radar is made at Orford Ness.

=== March ===
- March 1 – The United States Department of War establishes General Headquarters Air Force within the United States Army.
- March 9 – The Nazi Government in Germany publicly announces the formation of the Luftwaffe in defiance of the 1919 Treaty of Versailles. Hermann Göring is made its commander-in-chief, a position he holds almost until the end of World War II in 1945.
- March 15 – Wiley Post's second attempt to make the "First Air Mail Stratosphere Flight" over U.S. Air Mail Route #2 (AM-2) from Los Angeles, California, to New York City and set a speed record for a flight across the continental United States fails when mechanical problems force him to turn around 100 miles (87 nmi; 161 km) east of Cleveland, Ohio, and land his Lockheed 5C Vega Winnie Mae at Cleveland. Nonetheless, he achieves a 2,035-mile (1,768 nmi; 3,275 km) nonstop flight from Burbank, California, reaching Cleveland in a record time of 7 hours 19 minutes. Winnie Mae averages 279 mph (449 km/h) for the flight — 100 mph (161 km/h) higher than the plane's normal top speed — and reaches 340 mph (547 km/h) at times, indicating that Post had operated in the jet stream during the flight. Although falling short of its goal of reaching New York, the flight demonstrates the practicality of both Post's pressure suit and Winnie Mae's oxygen system for high-altitude flight, and that aircraft operating at such high altitudes on westbound flights can achieve impressive boosts in speed thanks to the jet stream.
- March 28 – Robert Goddard launches the world's first successful liquid-fuelled rocket.

=== April ===
- April 1 – Swissair begins services between Zürich and London.
- April 4 – United Airways Ltd is formed to operate services between England and the Isle of Man.
- April 13 - Qantas and Imperial Airways provide regular connecting flights between Brisbane, Australia, and London.
- April 14 – Wiley Post's third attempt to make the "First Air Mail Stratosphere Flight" over U.S. Air Mail Route #2 (AM-2) from Los Angeles, California, to New York City and set a speed record for a flight across the continental United States fails when his Lockheed 5C Vega Winnie Mae suffers mechanical problems that force him to land at Lafayette, Indiana, after a 1,760-mile (1,529 nmi; 2,832 km) flight from Burbank, California, that takes about eight hours.
- April 16–17 – The Pan American Airways Sikorsky S-42 Pioneer Clipper makes the first airline survey flight from California to Hawaii, departing from Alameda, California, and arriving at Pearl Harbor. The flight, which takes 17 hours 44 minutes, is the beginning of the development of an orderly commercial air transportation system in the Pacific Ocean.

=== May ===
- May 6
  - TWA Flight 6, a scheduled passenger flight from Albuquerque Municipal Airport in Albuquerque, New Mexico, to Kansas City, Missouri, aboard the Transcontinental & Western Air Douglas DC-2-112 NC13785, crashes near Atlanta, Missouri, killing five of the eight people on board. United States Senator Bronson M. Cutting of New Mexico is among the dead. Controversy over conflicting findings by the Bureau of Air Commerce and by a U.S. Senate committee regarding the cause of the crash will lead to the establishment in the United States of an independent air safety board under the Civil Aeronautics Act of 1938.
  - Frank Hawks arrives at Los Angeles, California, completing a 39-hour 52-minute flight from Buenos Aires, Argentina, to demonstrate the long-range capabilities of the Northrop Gamma 2E attack aircraft to the Argentine Navy, making eight rest and refueling stops along the way. Taking off from Buenos Aires on May 3 with Northrop chief test pilot Gage H. Irving in the plane's gunner's seat, Hawks has broken ten intercity speed records during the 8,090-mile (13,020-km) trip, including on the 3,430-mile (5,523-km) leg from Cristóbal, Panama, to Los Angeles, which he covers in a record-breaking 17 hours 50 minutes.
- May 18 – A Polikarpov I-5 fighter collides with the Tupolev ANT-20 Maxim Gorky while trying to conduct a loop around Maxim Gorky during a demonstration flight over Moscow. Maxim Gorky crashes near Tushino. Fifty-six people die, making it the worst heavier-than-air crash and second-worst air crash in history at the time, exceeded only by the death toll of 73 in the April 1933 crash of the U.S. Navy dirigible USS Akron (ZRS-4).
- May 31 – Hickam Field is dedicated in the Territory of Hawaii.

=== June ===
- June 15 – Wiley Post attempts his fourth and final attempt to make the "First Air Mail Stratosphere Flight" over U.S. Air Mail Route #2 (AM-2) from Los Angeles, California, to New York City and set a speed record for a flight across the continental United States. He takes off from Burbank, California, in the Lockheed 5C Vega Winnie Mae and passes over the Rocky Mountains at 35,000 feet (10,700 m), but as he crosses Kansas in the stratosphere Winnie Mae's engine fails, forcing him to make a deadstick landing at Wichita, Kansas, after a nonstop flight of 1,188 miles (1,032 nmi; 1,912 km). The incident leads Post to retire the record-setting Winnie Mae due to age and declining reliability.
- June 24 – A Ford Trimotor of Servicio Aéreo Colombiano (SACO) collides with another Ford Trimotor of Sociedad Colombo Alemana de Transporte Aéreo (SCADTA) in Medellín, Colombia. Fifteen people are killed, including the world-famous tango singer Carlos Gardel, the journalist, dramatist, and lyricist Alfredo Le Pera, and other musicians traveling with them to promote the new movie El día que me quieras ("The Day That You Will Love Me").
- June 25 – United States Coast Guard Lieutenant Richard L. Burke sets a world seaplane speed record carrying a 500 kg (1,102 lb) load over a 100 km (62.1 mi) course at an average speed of 280.105 kilometres per hour (174.049 mph) flying a Grumman JF-2 Duck.
- June 26 – Soviet military balloon pilots Christian Zille and Yury Prilutsky and Professor Alexander Verigo attempt to set a new altitude record for human flight in the balloon USSR-1 Bis. Launching from Moscow's Kuntsevo District, they fall some 19,000 feet (5,800 meters) short of the record when the balloon begins an unexpected descent from an altitude of 53,000 feet (16,000 meters). As the rate of descent increases dangerously, Verigo bails out at 3,500 meters (11,500 feet) and Prilutsky at 2,500 meters (8,200 feet), after which Zille manages to bring the descent under control and makes a soft landing in the gondola near Trufanovo in the Russian Soviet Federated Socialist Republic's Tula Oblast. The Soviet government will award all three crew members the Order of Lenin for the flight.
- June 27 – United States Coast Guard Lieutenant Richard L. Burke sets a world seaplane altitude record of 5,449.050 metres (17,877.46 ft) carrying a 500 kg (1,100 lb) load, flying a Grumman JF-2 Duck.

=== July ===
- Facing bankruptcy, the Société des Avions Bernard (French: Bernard Aircraft Company) goes out of business. It and its two predecessor companies had manufactured aircraft since 1917.
- July 1 – The American flying team The Flying Keys sets an endurance record by flying a Curtiss Robin non-stop for 653 hours, 34 minutes in the vicinity of Meridian, Mississippi. During the flight, which began on June 4, the Robin's two-man crew receives fuel, other supplies, and fuel in mid-air from a similar aircraft. The flight covers 52,320 miles (84,200 kilometers) and uses more than 6,000 gallons (4,996 Imperial gallons; 22,712 liters) of gasoline.
- July 10 – The Bell Aircraft Corporation is founded in Buffalo, New York.
- July 13 – The Shoreham Airport terminal building is opened at Lancing, England.
- July 30 – During United States Navy tests of an instrument flying system, Lieutenant Frank Peak Akers takes off from Naval Air Station San Diego in San Diego, California, in a Berliner-Joyce OJ-2 outfitted with a hooded cockpit to locate and land aboard the aircraft carrier USS Langley (CV-1), which is operating at an unspecified location somewhere in the Pacific Ocean about 150 nautical miles (280 km; 170 mi) west of California. Flying "blind" the entire way, he uses instrument to find Langley and land safely aboard her. He will receive the Distinguished Flying Cross for his achievement.

=== August ===
- Because of deteriorating relations between Italy and Ethiopia, the British aircraft carriers HMS Courageous and HMS Glorious disembark their aircraft at Alexandria, Egypt, to guard against any outbreak of war spreading to British-controlled territory. The aircraft remain ashore in Egypt until early 1936.
- August 5 – French aviator Marcel Cagnot takes off in the Farman F.1001 in an attempt to set a new world altitude record. The attempt ends in tragedy when one of the F.1001's cupola windows fail at an altitude of 10,000 meters (32,808 feet), leading to a rapid decompression and the death of Cagnot.
- August 15 – Wiley Post, the first pilot to fly solo around the world, and his passenger, the humorist Will Rogers, are killed in the crash of a hybrid Lockheed Orion/Lockheed Explorer aircraft near Point Barrow in the Territory of Alaska.

=== September ===
- September 15 – A Seversky SEV-3 sets a world speed record for piston-engined amphibious airplanes, reaching 230.413 mph (370.814 km/h). The record still stands.
- September 17 – Professional baseball player Len Koenecke of the Brooklyn Dodgers becomes so drunk on a flight to New York City that he is shackled to his seat and removed from the airliner in Detroit, Michigan. After sleeping in an airport chair there, he charters a plane to take him to Buffalo, New York. While the plane flies over Canada, Koenecke has a disagreement with the pilot and another passenger and attempts to seize control of the plane. To avoid a crash, the pilot and other passenger hit him over the head with a fire extinguisher, and he dies of a cerebral hemorrhage.>
- September 27 – The three obsolete biplanes that constitute the entire serviceable strength of the Ethiopian Air Force conduct a flypast as part of a military procession at Addis Ababa for the Emperor of Ethiopia, Haile Selassie I, who is trying to prepare Ethiopia for war with Italy.
- September 30 – Hillman's Airways, Spartan Air Lines, and United Airways Limited merge to form Allied British Airways, Ltd. The new airline will begin flight operations on January 1, 1936.

=== October ===
- Helen Richey, the first female pilot for a regularly scheduled airline, resigns her position as a first officer at Pennsylvania Central Airlines after 10 months. She had found the experience demeaning: she had received few opportunities to fly; male pilots ignored her or made her uncomfortable in the cockpit, had threatened to strike, and had voted to deny her membership in the Air Lines Pilot Association; and the Bureau of Air Commerce had ordered her grounded in bad weather and had backed the pilots' union's request that the airline limit her to three flights per month.
- October 1 – The first company to bear the name British Airways Ltd is formed, by the merger of Hillman's Airways, Spartan Air Lines and United Airways Ltd.
- October 3 – Italy invades Ethiopia from its colony in Eritrea, beginning the Second Italo-Abyssinian War. The Italian expeditionary force has 150 aircraft – including Savoia-Marchetti SM.81, Caproni Ca.113, and Caproni Ca.133 bombers, Savoia-Marchetti S.55 flying boats, and IMAM R.37bis strategic reconnaissance planes – while the serviceable portion of the Imperial Ethiopian Air Force consists only of three small, obsolete biplanes.
- October 5 – Italian aircraft conduct a destructive and bloody bombing of Adowa, Ethiopia, after Ethiopian forces had withdrawn from it. The village had been the site of a disastrous defeat of Italian troops by Ethiopian forces in the Battle of Adowa in 1896.
- October 6 – The Société des Avions Bernard (French: Bernard Aircraft Company) goes into receivership. It had closed in July.
- October 7 – United Airlines Trip 4, a Boeing 247D, crashes east of Silver Crown, Wyoming, killing all 12 people on board.
- October 9 – The Martin M-130, a flying boat designed for Pan American Airways (the future Pan American World Airways) receives its type cerificate from the United States Department of Commerce's Aeronautics Branch.
- October 29 – Allied British Airways Ltd is renamed British Airways Ltd. It will begin flight operations on January 1, 1936.
- October 30
  - The Boeing Model 299, prototype of the Boeing B-17 Flying Fortress, crashes at Wright Field, Ohio, because of its gust locks remaining engaged on takeoff, killing Boeing test pilot Leslie Tower and United States Army Air Corps test pilot Ployer Peter Hill.
  - A United Airlines Boeing Model 247D airliner on an instrument check flight with no passengers on board crashes near Cheyenne, Wyoming, killing the entire crew of four.

=== November ===
- November 2 – The Pan American Airways Martin M-130 flying boat China Clipper makes an experimental 2,400-mile (3,900 km) round-trip flight from Miami, Florida, to San Juan, Puerto Rico, to test the plane's capability to make non-stop flights between California and Hawaii. The China Clipper makes the outbound flight in 8 hours 15 minutes, then makes a quick turnaround at San Juan and flies back to Miami, suffering only a minor malfunction in one engine.
- November 8 – Sir Charles Kingsford Smith and his copilot Tommy Pethybridge in the Lockheed Altair Lady Southern Cross disappear over the Andaman Sea off the coast of Burma near Aye Island during an attempt to set an England-to-Australia speed record, never to be seen again.
- November 11 – A. W. Stevens and O. A. Anderson set a new balloon altitude record of 72,395 feet (22,066 m)
- November 11–13 – Jean Batten becomes the first woman to fly solo across the South Atlantic, taking 2 days 13 hours from England to cross from Senegal to Brazil in a Percival Gull. She also breaks the speed record for this crossing, by a full day.
- November 21 – The American polar explorer Lincoln Ellsworth and his pilot, Herbert Hollick-Kenyon, take off from Dundee Island east of the northeastern tip of the Antarctic Peninsula in the Northrop Gamma Polar Star to attempt the first flight across Antarctica, bound for the abandoned base at Little America on the Ross Ice Shelf, a journey of about 2,200 miles (3,500-kilometers).
- November 22
  - Pan American Airways commences both the first regular transpacific air service to Hawaii and the first transpacific air mail service, flying the Martin M-130 flying boat China Clipper from Alameda, California, to Manila, where it arrives on 29 November after overnight stops at Honolulu, Midway Atoll, Wake Island, and Sumay, Guam. The aircraft carries more than 110,000 pieces of mail. Among its crew are pilot Edwin C. Musick and navigator Fred Noonan.
  - On the island of Hawaii, the volcano Mauna Loa's Mokuʻāweoweo crater begins an eruption with the potential to destroy Hilo, prompting the United States Army Air Corps to begin surveillance flights to monitor the eruption.
- November 23 – As Lincoln Ellsworth and Herbert Hollick-Kenyon fly across Antarctica, they discover mountains which Ellsworth pthorgraphs and names the Sentinel Range. The Sentinel Range is later found to be the northern half of a mountain range which is named the Ellsworth Mountains in honor of Ellsworth.

=== December ===
- To mark the 300th anniversary of French rule in the Americas, the Latécoère 521 flying boat Lieutenant de Vaisseau Paris makes a demonstration flight from France to Dakar, Senegal, then across the South Atlantic Ocean to Natal, Brazil, then to the French West Indies. It then flies on to Pensacola, Florida, where it suffers damage in a storm. It later is repaired and returns to service.
- A United States Marine Corps Grumman JF-2 Duck sets an unofficial world speed record for single-engine amphibian aircraft, reaching 191 miles per hour (307 kilometres per hour)r).
- December 6 – Transcontinental and Western Air's first flight attendants – known at the time as "air hostesses" – begin flying, serving passengers aboard the airline's Douglas DC-2 aircraft.
- December 10 – A Sabena Savoia-Marchetti S.73 crashes into a hillside at Tatsfield, Surrey, in the United Kingdom, killing all 11 people on board. Among the dead is English tank and vehicle designer Sir John Carden.
- December 15 – The American polar explorer Lincoln Ellsworth and his pilot, Herbert Hollick-Kenyon, arrive on foot at the abandoned base at Little America on the Ross Ice Shelf, completing a journey of about 2,200 miles (3,500 kilometers) from Dundee Island and becoming the first people to fly across Antarctica. The journey — which includes a number of unplanned landings due to problems with navigational equipment and bad weather, a storm that keeps them grounded for three days, a final forced landing when their Northrop Gamma aircraft Polar Star runs out of fuel less than four miles (6 km) from Little America, and a 10-day walk to Little America — has taken an unexpectedly long three and a half weeks, of which 14 hours were in the air. They claim 350,000 square miles (910,000 km^{2}) of territory for the United States during their flight. A faulty radio prevents them from reporting their arrival and they are declared missing. Searchers find them alive and well at Little America on 16 January 1936.
- December 26 – General Rodolfo Graziani requests permission from Benito Mussolini to use poison gas against Ethiopian forces. He receives it, and during the last few days of December Italian aircraft begin dropping mustard gas on Ethiopian troops around the Takkaze River and on the village of Jijiga. Italian planes will drop poison gas for the remainder of the war, and continue to use it against Ethiopian guerrillas after the war ends.
- December 27 – Under the direction of volcanologist Thomas Jaggar, U.S. Army Air Corps Keystone B-4 bombers from Wheeler Field on Oahu bomb lava tubes to divert a flow of lava from Mauna Loa that is threatening Hilo on the island of Hawaii, and tragedy strikes when two of the bombers crash upon their return to Oahu at Luke Field on Ford Island in Pearl Harbor, killing several aviators. The bombing diverts the lava flow within a day, and additional bombing by U.S. Navy amphibious aircraft diverts lava away from Hilo's waterworks.
- December 31 – The Imperial Airways Short S.8 Calcutta flying boat City of Khartoum (registration G-AASJ) suffers a catastrophic failure of all three engines shortly before the end of its flight between Crete and Alexandria, Egypt, just after nightfall and makes a forced landing on the Mediterranean Sea. The pilot is the only survivor; all nine passengers and the other three crew members die on impact or drown when the aircraft is overwhelmed by high seas and sinks.

== First flights ==
- Arado Ar 81
- Avro 636
- Bellanca 31-40 Senior Pacemaker
- Focke-Wulf Fw 58
- Focke-Wulf Fw 159
- Grigorovich E-2 (also known as Grigorovich DG-55)
- Grigorovich IP-1
- Henschel Hs 122
- Miles M.2 Hawk Trainer
- Miles M.5 Sparrowhawk
- Miles M.6 Hawcon
- Northrop 3A
- Piaggio P.23M
- Potez 452
- Potez 60
- Spring 1935
  - Arado Ar 80
  - Henschel Hs 123
- Summer 1935 – Ilyushin TsKB-26
- Autumn 1935 – Hafner A.R.III Gyroplane
- Late 1935 – Yokosuka B4Y (Allied reporting name "Jean")

=== January ===
- Amiot 142
- ANF Les Mureaux 117R.2
- Polikarpov R-Z
- January 5 – Tachikawa Ki-9 (Allied reporting name "Spruce")
- January 7 – Avro 652
- January 10 – Latécoère 521
- January 18 – Blohm & Voss Ha 137
- January 28 – Potez 62

=== February ===
- Watanabe E9W (Allied reporting name "Slim"), first Japanese aircraft designed specifically for operation from a submarine
- February 4 – Mitsubishi A5M (Allied reporting name "Claude")
- February 5 – Westland CL.20
- February 21 – Rolls-Royce PV-12 aero engine, prototype of the Rolls-Royce Merlin (in a Hawker Hart)
- February 24 – Heinkel He 111

=== March ===
- Kawasaki Ki-10 (Allied reporting name "Perry")
- March 6 – ANF Les Mureaux 115R.2
- March 15 – Dornier Do 18
- March 20 – Grumman XF3F-1, prototype of the Grumman F3F
- March 24 – Avro Anson military prototype K4771
- March 28 – Kassel 12A

=== April ===
- Douglas DB-1, prototype of the B-18 Bolo
- Martin-Baker MB 1
- April 1 – The NA-16 prototype of the T-6 Texan/Harvard
- April 5 – Fairchild 91
- April 12 – Bristol Type 142, the Britain First, prototype of the Bristol Blenheim

=== May ===
- May 15 – Curtiss Model 75, prototype of the P-36 Hawk
- May 11 – Miles M.4 Merlin prototype U-8, later G-ADFE
- May 19 – Consolidated XPBY-1, prototype of the PBY Catalina
- May 29 – Messerschmitt Bf 109 V1 D-IABI
- May 31 – Fairchild Model 45

=== June ===
- Cessna C-34 Airmaster
- June 4 – Armstrong Whitworth AW.23 K3585
- June 19 – Vickers Wellesley
- June 23 – Bristol Bombay K3583
- June 25 – Grumman J2F-1, first version of the Grumman J2F Duck
- June 25 – Farman F.1000

=== July ===
- Mitsubishi Ka-15, prototype of the Mitsubishi G3M (Allied reporting name "Nell")
- Tachikawa Ki-17 (Allied reporting name "Cedar")
- July 6 – Fairchild 82
- July 11 – Yakovlev AIR-19, prototype of the Yakovlev UT-2
- July 17 – Boeing Model 299 (US civil "eXperimental" registration NX13372), prototype of the B-17 Flying Fortress
- July 25 – Latécoère 582
- July 27 – Miles Falcon Six

=== August ===
- August 8 – Morane-Saulnier MS.405
- August 9 – Dewoitine D.338
- August 12 – De Havilland Dragonfly
- August 15 – Seversky SEV-1XP, prototype of the Seversky P-35
- August 17 – Hughes H-1 Racer
- August 19
  - CANT Z.506
  - Northrop XBT-1, prototype of the Northrop BT
- August 21 – Bücker Bü 133 Jungmeister

=== September ===
- Heinkel He 112
- September 17 – Junkers Ju 87

=== October ===
- October 22 – Dewoitine D.620

=== November ===
- November 6 – Hawker Hurricane K5083

=== December ===
- December 17 – Douglas DST, prototype of the Douglas DC-3
- December 18 – Miles M.7 Nighthawk
- December 31 – Avro Anson Mark I, first production version of the Anson

== Entered service ==
- Aeronca L
- Beriev MBR-2 with Soviet Naval Aviation
- Breguet 521 Bizerte with French Naval Aviation
- Junkers Ju 160 with Deutsche Luft Hansa
- Levasseur PL.101 with French Naval Aviation aboard the aircraft carrier Béarn
- Nakajima Ki-4 with the Imperial Japanese Army Air Force
- Polikarpov R-Z with the Soviet Air Force

=== January ===
- January 28 – Grumman F2F with United States Navy Fighter Squadron 2 (VF-2B) aboard USS Lexington (CV-2) and Fighter Squadron 3 (VF-3B) aboard USS Ranger (CV-4)

=== March ===
- March 11 – Avro 652 with Imperial Airways

=== April ===
- April 26 – Boeing Y1B-9 by the United States Army Air Corps

=== July ===
- Amiot 143 with the French Air Force

=== August ===
- Avro 636 with the Irish Air Corps

=== October ===
- Nakajima E8N (Allied reporting name "Dave") with the Imperial Japanese Navy

=== November ===
- Hawker Hind
- November 22 – Martin M-130 with Pan American Airways

== Retirements ==
- Westland Interceptor

=== October ===
- Handley Page Hinaidi by the Royal Air Force
