= Hollick-Kenyon Plateau =

Snow plateau in Marie Byrd Land, Antarctica

Hollick-Kenyon Plateau (78°S 105°W) is a large, relatively featureless snow plateau in Antarctica, 1,200 to 1,800 metres (4,000 to 6,000 ft) above sea level, located between the northern portion of the Ellsworth Mountains, to the east, and Mount Takahe and the Crary Mountains, to the west. It was discovered by Lincoln Ellsworth on his trans-Antarctic airplane flight during November–December 1935, and named by Ellsworth for his pilot, Herbert Hollick-Kenyon.
