= Polar Star (airplane) =

Northrop 2B Gamma airplane

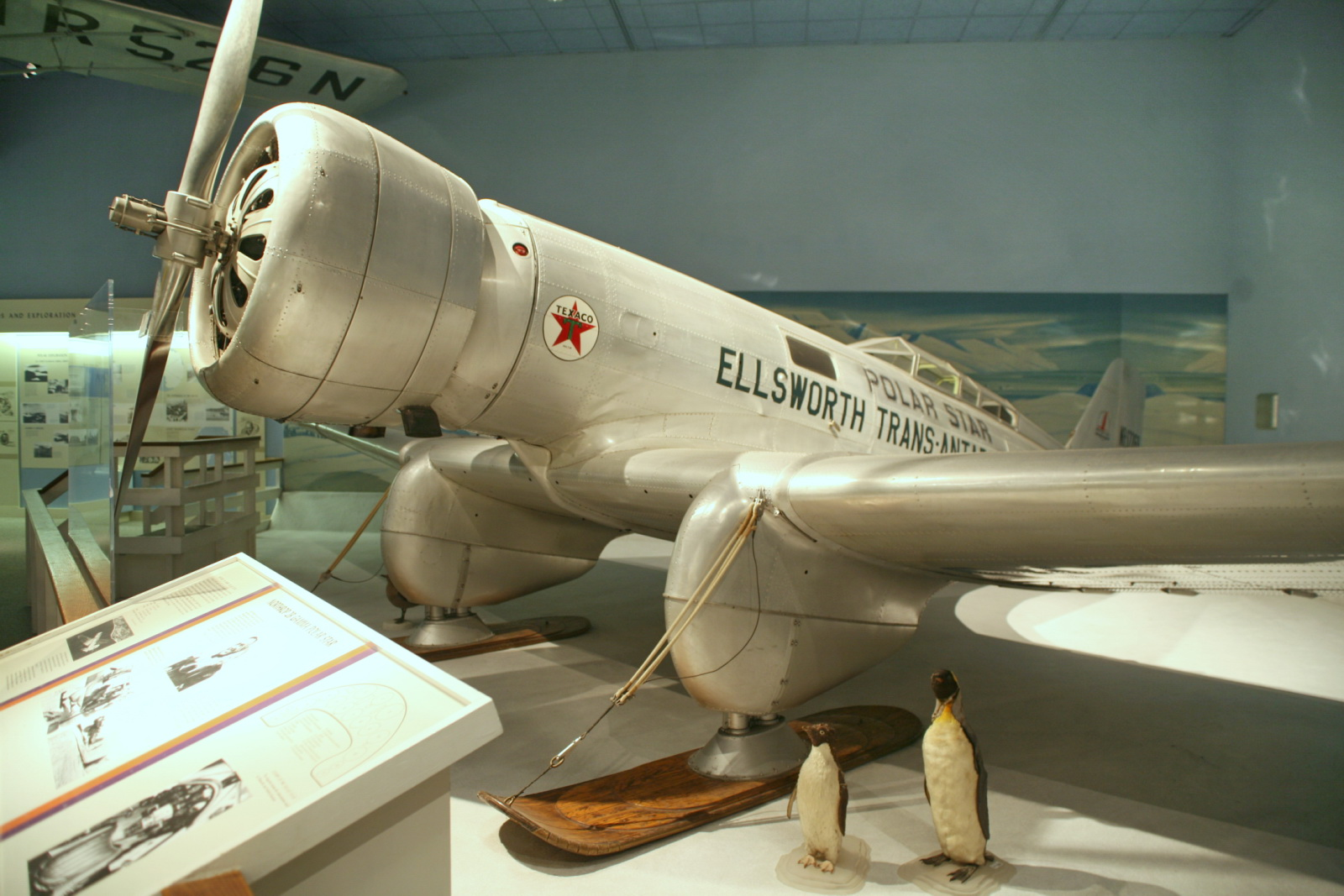
- Polar Star at the National Air and Space Museum

General information
- Type: Northrop 2B Gamma
- Manufacturer: Northrop
- Owners: Lincoln Ellsworth
- Registration: NR12269

History
- First flight: 1934
- Last flight: 1936
- Preserved at: National Air and Space Museum
- Fate: preserved

Polar Star is the airplane used by polar explorer Lincoln Ellsworth, an early adaptor of airplanes for polar exploration who worked closely with Roald Amundsen.

Polar Star was an all-metal Northrop Gamma, which had a low-wing, reducing the effects of winds and wide skis that could be swapped with wheels or pontoons and a cruising range of 5,000 mi (4,300 nmi; 8,000 km).

Polar Star shipped to the Antarctic in 1934 on the motor vessel Wyatt Earp, based in Norway. Australian explorer Sir Hubert Wilkins was the advisor and Norwegian-American explorer Bernt Balchen served as the first pilot. The expedition reached the Bay of Whales by ship on 6 January 1934, and Ellsworth intended to make a round-trip flight with Balchen between the Bay of Whales and the Weddell Sea. However, the skis broke on the ice.

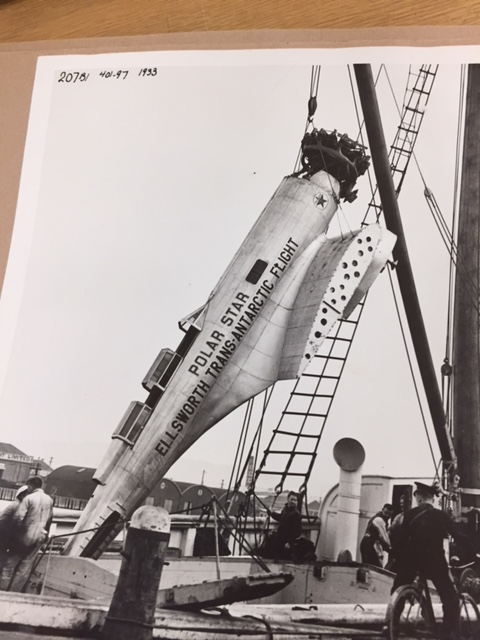
Polar Star loading on HMAS Wyatt Earp

In September 1934 a second attempt to fly Polar Star in the Antarctic was unsuccessful as well.

Finally, in late 1935, Ellsworth's third attempt with a new pilot, Herbert Hollick-Kenyon, was successful. The aircraft flew for 14 hours and, although the fuselage was damaged on landing, the aircraft was able to fly again.

For this achievement, Ellsworth was awarded the National Geographic Society’s Hubbard Medal by President Franklin D. Roosevelt in April 1936 for distinction within exploration, discovery and research. Also in 1936 he was declared an honorary member of the Norwegian Geographical Society.

In 1936, Ellsworth donated Polar Star to the Smithsonian Institution in Washington, DC. It is now housed at the National Air and Space Museum.
