= Trufanovo =

Trufanovo Труфаново
- Village
- Location within Vladimir Oblast Location within Russia
- Coordinates: 55°37′48″N 40°22′58″E
- Country: Russia
- Region: Vladimir Oblast
- District: Gus-Khrustalny District
- Time zone: UTC+3:00

Trufanovo (Russian: Труфаново) is a rural locality (a village) in Posyolok Urshelsky, Gus-Khrustalny District, Vladimir Oblast, Russia. The population was 110 as of 2010.

== Geography ==
Trufanovo is located on the Pol River, 25 km west of Gus-Khrustalny (the district's administrative centre) by road. Savinskaya is the nearest rural locality.
