= Herbert Hollick-Kenyon =

20th-century British pilot notable for pioneering Antarctic aviation

Herbert Hollick-Kenyon (17 April 1897 – 30 July 1975) was a British-Canadian aircraft pilot who made significant contributions towards aviation in Antarctica.

== Early life ==
Herbert Hollick-Kenyon was born in London on 17 April 1897. His mother, Annie Kate Kenyon, was the oldest child of James Harold Kenyon (1841-1891), founder of the prestigious London funeral directors, J.H. Kenyon. His father, Herbert Hollick by birth, was employed by the firm and by 1890 was a director. On his marriage to Annie Kenyon in September 1891 he appended 'Kenyon' to his name, becoming Herbert Hollick Kenyon. From 1892-1910 he was managing director.

At an early age, Hollick-Kenyon, with his family, emigrated to Ewing's Landing in the province of British Columbia in Canada. He joined the Canadian army in 1914 as a trooper. He joined the Royal Flying Corps in 1917. In the spring of 1928 he joined Western Canada Airways in Winnipeg and commenced flying in Western Canada. He helped to pioneer the Prairie Air Mail routes and is credited with several "first flights".

== Polar search and rescue ==
Prior to the start of World War II, Hollick-Kenyon participated as a pilot during several search-and-rescue missions for polar expeditions which had gone missing. These missions included searching for the MacAlpine Expedition in 1929 and Sigizmund Levanevsky who went missing during a trans-polar flight from Moscow to Alaska in 1937.

== The Ellsworth Expedition ==
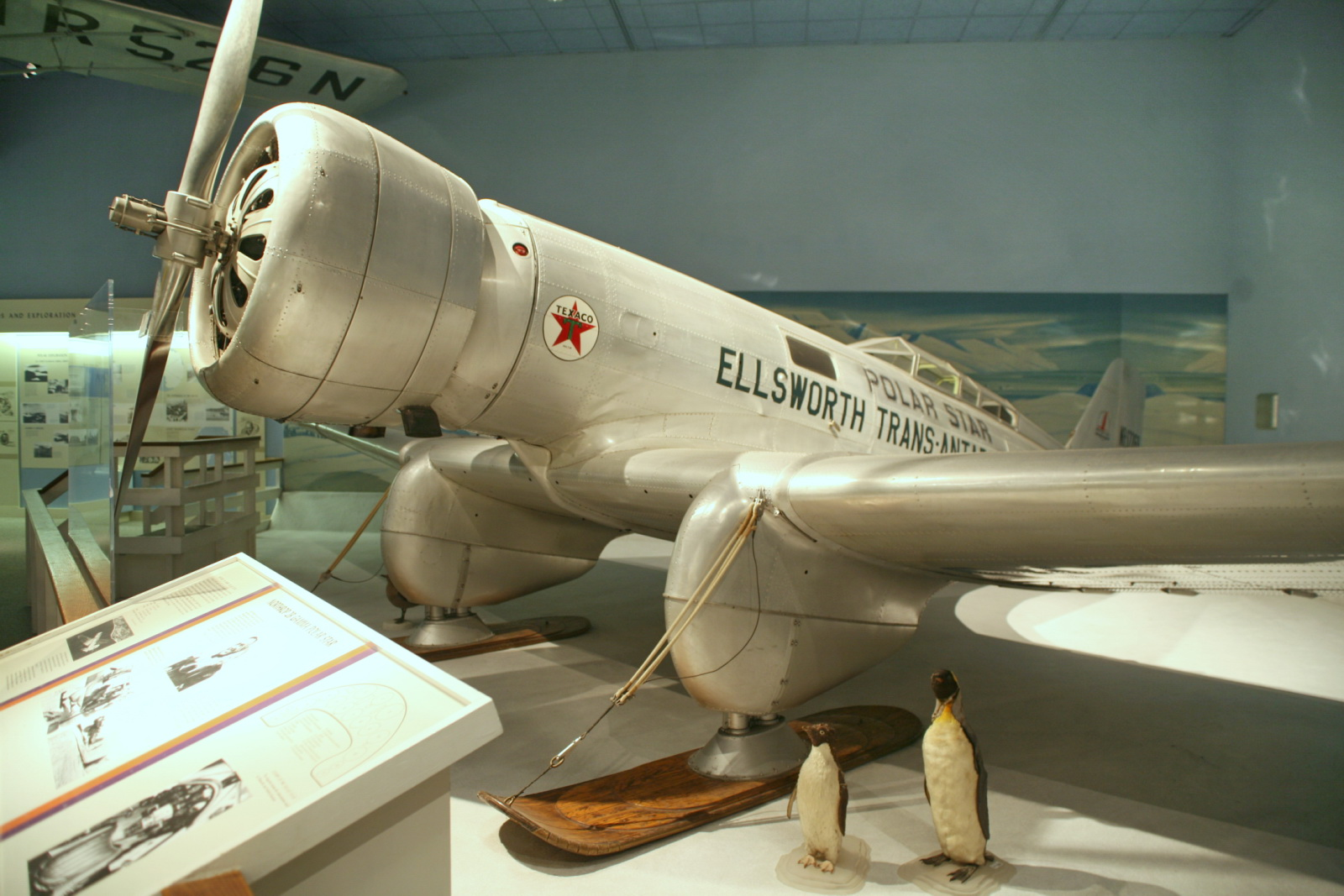
The Polar Star

Hollick-Kenyon is most widely known as a pilot in the trans-Antarctic flight of Lincoln Ellsworth in 1935.

Ellsworth had made a prior attempt to fly across the south pole in 1934 with a different pilot, Bernt Balchen. Poor weather and a dispute over the number of crew members in the expedition (Ellsworth wanted 2, Balchen wanted 3) ended the trip.

Hollick-Kenyon (serving as a replacement for Balchen) and Ellsworth left on 23 November 1935 from Dundee Island bound for Richard E. Byrd's base camp at Little America. They flew 3,500 kilometres (2,200 mi) across the breadth of Antarctica, claiming 350,000 square miles (910,000 km^{2}) of land for the United States of America.

They were forced to land 26 km short of their goal due to the lack of fuel. They began walking, but due to the loss of their radio at the outset of the trip, had been assumed lost by the United States. They arrived at the Little America camp, where they remained for nearly two months. They were eventually spotted by the British research ship Discovery which took them aboard and returned them safely home.

Hollick-Kenyon flew a Northrop Gamma (serial number 2B), a single-engine, low-winged airplane called the Polar Star. Hollick-Kenyon later recovered the aircraft and it was donated to the Smithsonian Institution in 1936 by Ellsworth.

== Awards and distinctions ==
- A major land area in Antarctica is now named the "Hollick-Kenyon Plateau" in his honor.
- Hollick-Kenyon was inducted into the Canada's Aviation Hall of Fame in 1975 for his achievements.

== Named for Hollick-Kenyon ==
- Hollick-Kenyon Peninsula, Antarctica
- Hollick-Kenyon Plateau, Antarctica
- Hollick-Kenyon, Edmonton, a neighbourhood in Edmonton, Alberta, Canada
- Kenyon Field, now called Lethbridge Airport, in Lethbridge, Alberta, Canada.
