= Farman F.1000 =

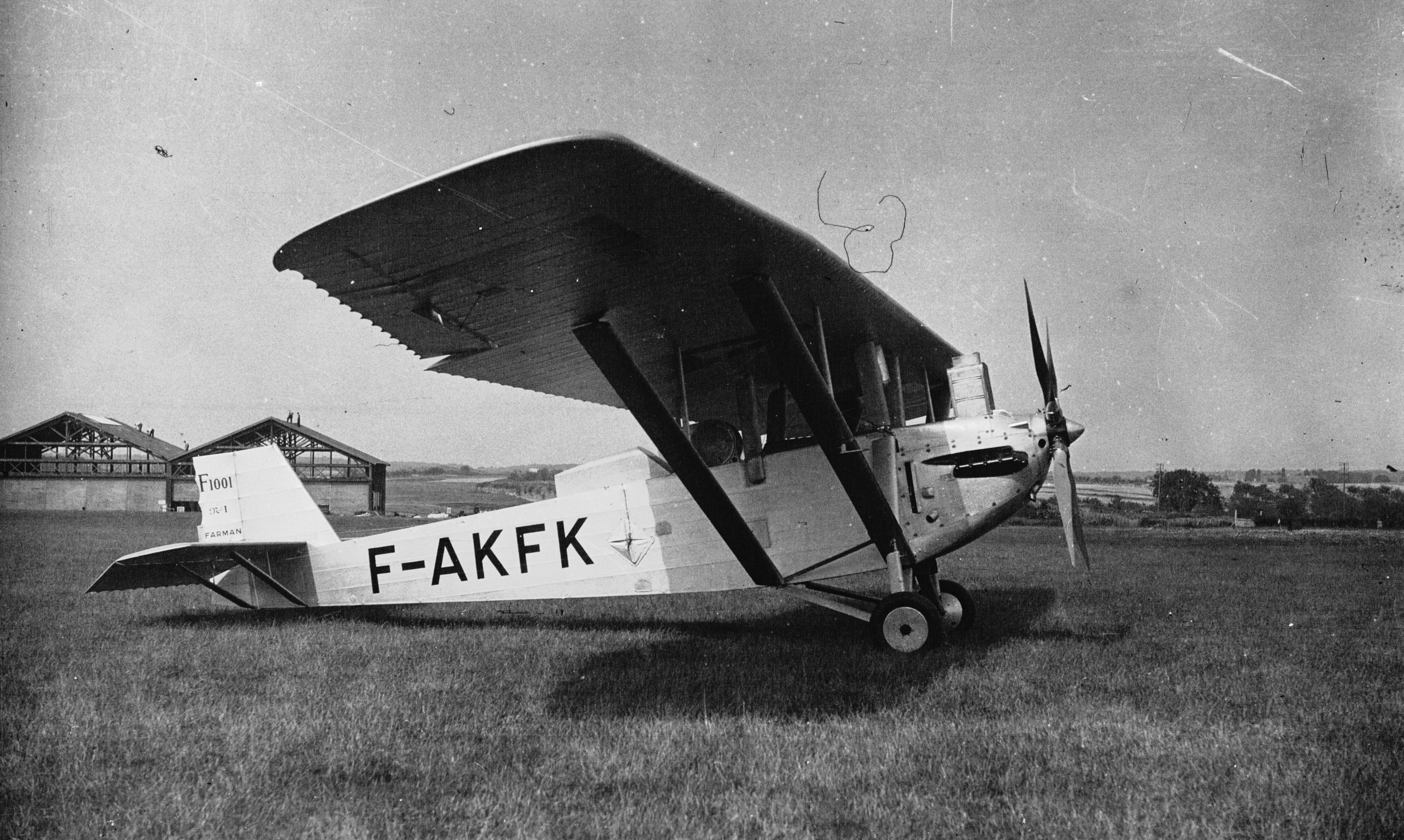
- F.1001 in August 1935.

General information
- Type: Record-breaking monoplane
- National origin: France
- Manufacturer: Farman
- Number built: 3

History
- First flight: 25 June 1932

The Farman F.1000 was a 1930s French monoplane designed by Farman to break the world altitude record.

== Development ==
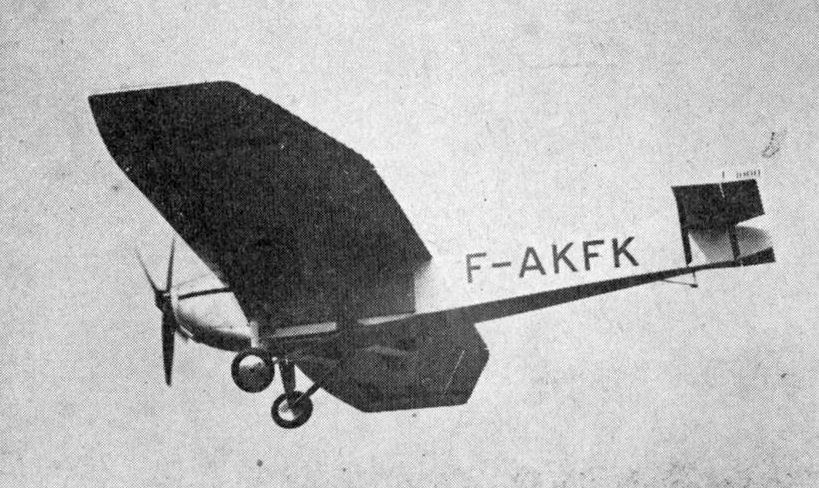
Farman F.1002

The F.1000 was a high-wing strut-braced monoplane with a large wing area. It had a conventional fixed landing gear and was powered by a 350 hp (261 kW) Farman 8Vi engine. The aircraft first flew on 25 June 1932, piloted by Lucien Coupet.

The pilot had a restricted view on landing and take-off and the aircraft was modified with a raised seat mounted on top of the aircraft's fuselage leaving just the pilot's legs in the original cockpit. For landing the pilot opened the pressurized hatch above his head, moved the sliding rudder bar to the up position, strapped into the fuselage seat and attached a removable stick to control the aircraft. During the rest of the flight the pilot had a pressurised cabin with just two small windows on each side.

The F.1000 only reached 5000 m (16,405 ft) during tests, so Farman redesigned the aircraft as the Farman F.1001 which had a parasol wing and an improved view for the pilot. Powered by a Farman Wirs engine it first flew in June 1935. On 5 August 1935 the aircraft, with pilot Marcel Cagnot, took off on what would be a fatal attempt at the world record. The barograph recovered showed the aircraft had reached 10,000 m (32,810 ft) but a failure of one of the cupola windows had led to a rapid decompression and death of the pilot.

A more developed version appeared later as the Farman F.1002, although it made several flights over 8,000 m (26,425 ft) little is known about the aircraft.

== Variants ==
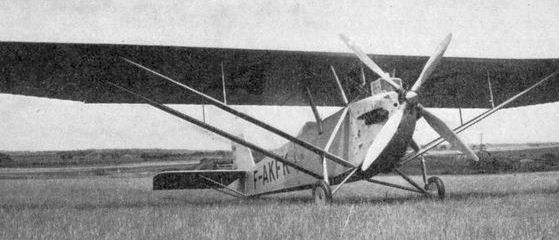
Farman F.1001 photo from L'Aerophile September 1935

F.1000
Original 350 hp (260 kW) Farman 8Vi powered aircraft, one built.
F.1001
Improved version, powered by a 540 hp (400 kW) Farman 12 Wiars, one built. First flown in May 1935, on 4 August 1935, the bursting of a window at 10,400 m (34,100 ft) led to the death of the pilot.
F.1002
Further improved variant, powered by a 540 hp (400 kW) Farman 12 Wiars, first flown in July 1936.

== Specifications (F.1000) ==
Data from

General characteristics

- Crew: 1 (2 according to Popular Science, 1932)
- Length: 11.50 m (37 ft 8.75 in)
- Wingspan: 18.5 m (60 ft 8.25 in)
- Height: 3.50 m (11 ft 5.75 in)
- Wing area: 72.50 m^{2} (780.41 sq ft)
- Gross weight: 2,535 kg (5,589 lb)
- Powerplant: 1 × Farman 8Vi inverted V-8 water-cooled piston engine with triple superchargers , 261 kW (350 hp)

Performance

- Maximum speed: 289 km/h (179 mph, 156 kn)
- Service ceiling: 20,000 m (65,615 ft) (estimated)

== Bibliography ==
- Borget, Michel (September 1974). "Le Farman 1000~1001: Farman à assault de la stratosphère (2)" [The Farman 1000/1001: Farman Assaults the Stratosphere, Part 2]. Le Fana de l'Aviation (in French) (58): 30–33. ISSN 0757-4169.
- Liron, Jean (1984). Les avions Farman. Collection Docavia. Vol. 21. Paris: Éditions Larivière. OCLC 37146471.
- The Illustrated Encyclopedia of Aircraft (Part Work 1982-1985). Orbis Publishing.
