= Romanian air tours over Africa =

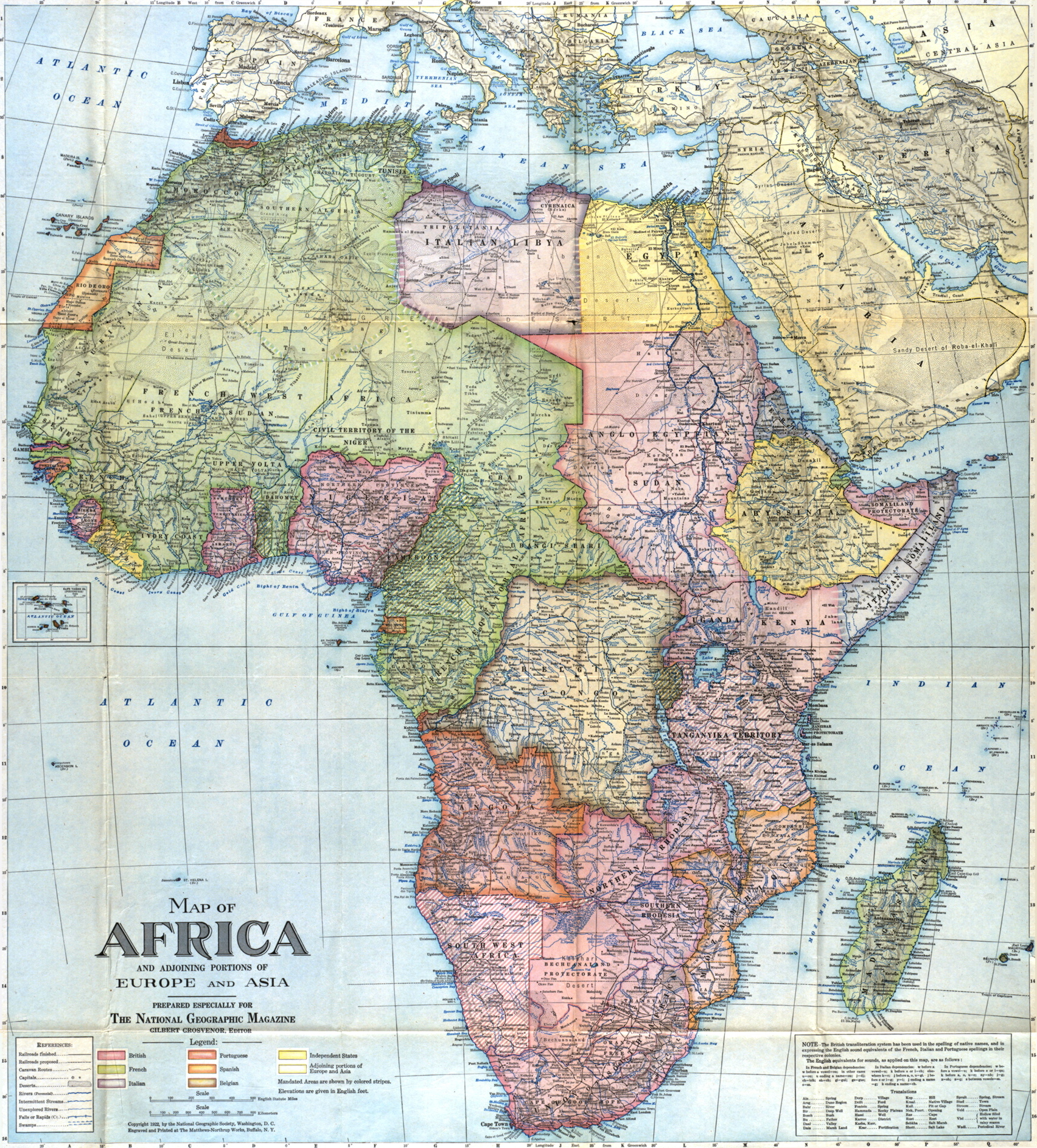
Political map of Africa in the interwar period (1922)

The Romanian air tours over Africa were a series of trips, called "raids" in Romanian literature, made by the Romanian airmen over Africa between 1933 and 1935, with the purpose of promoting air tourism, Romanian airplanes, as well as Romanian aviation in general. Given global aviation development, exploring its possibilities and setting up aircraft records were an everyday occurrence.

The one who had the idea of making a major air tour was Lieutenant colonel Alexandru Cernescu, in 1932. A core of aircraft pilots consisting of Alexandru Cernescu and captains George Davidescu and Mihail Pantazi began to organize the air tour. They chose the distance from Bucharest to Cape Town and return to be the route. The first air tour of 1933 did not reach its goal, as it stopped at Malakal. In 1933 and 1935, Gheorghe Bănciulescu also conducted two air tours over Africa, the first to Cairo, over the Near East, returning over North Africa and Italy, and the last exploring the possible air routes over Central Africa. At the beginning of 1935, Irina Burnaia also attempted to cover the route to Cape Town by her own plane, reaching the Victoria Lake. In 1935 Cernescu, Davidescu, Pantazi, Gheorghe Jienescu, Gheorghe Olteanu and Anton Stengher managed to complete the air tour.

== Historical background ==
Aviation began to develop rapidly after World War I. There appeared various types of aircraft, not only military but also civil aircraft, including passengers, postal and private aircraft. Each aircraft manufacturer wanted to bring their airplanes in the public eye, the airline companies explored new routes, whereas military aviation was interested in increasing the performance of the military aircraft: the speed, the ceiling, the rate of climb, the transport capacity etc. Besides record-breaking, aviation asserted itself by air "tours", long-distance travels, such as those from London to Melbourne, from Paris to Tokyo and return, or from Bucharest to Saigon and return.

Due to its difficult climatic, meteorological and terrain conditions, Africa was considered a continent where the qualities of the aircraft and the skill of the pilots could be fully aired. As far back as October 1913, the French aviator Pierre Daucourt and his mechanic, Henri J. Roux, attempted to fly a Borel monoplane from Paris to Cairo, but they could not fly above the Taurus Mountains. The first air tour over Africa, from Cairo to Khartoum, was conducted by Marc Pourpe between 4–12 January 1914, flying around 2,000 km, via Luxor, Wadi Halfa and Abu Hamad. He carried a mail bag during the tour. The return flight to Cairo was conducted between the 19 January and the 3 February. The South Africans Pierre van Ryneveld and Quintin Brand (1920) and the Englishman Alan Cobham (1925) conducted air tours from London to Cape Town. The Cairo to Cape Town air route will become the target of many records, such as those broken by Reinhold Ferdinand Caspareuthus (1930, 77 hours),) or Glen Kidston (1931, 57 hours)

== Planning the tours ==
The idea behind Romanian air tours conducted in Africa appeared in 1932, when a core group of three officers, Lieutenant colonel (Note: Equivalent to Wing commander) Alexandru Cernescu, Captains George Davidescu and Mihail Pantazi began to do some research for this purpose. At that time Alexandru Cernescu held the highest rank as a flight instructor at the Military Aviation School. George Davidescu, as a member of the State Undersecretariat for Air, dealt with the proper organization of the tour, as he was also the main navigator. Mihail Pantazi was a flight instructor and director and he taught the aircraft engines at the Romanian Association for the Promotion of Aviation (ARPA) Flight School.

First, they studied the route of a flight around the Mediterranean Sea, which started from Bucharest, then continued over Asia Minor, Egypt, North Africa, Spain, France, and back to Bucharest. Although the route exceeded 10,000 km, they did not considered it difficult enough. In order to demonstrate the performance the Romanian aircraft could reach, the route over the centre of Africa to Cape Town was conducted by a flight formation of three school and training aircraft, which technically reached a small private aircraft performance. The round-trip route exceeded 24,000 km.

== Bucharest – Malakal tour ==
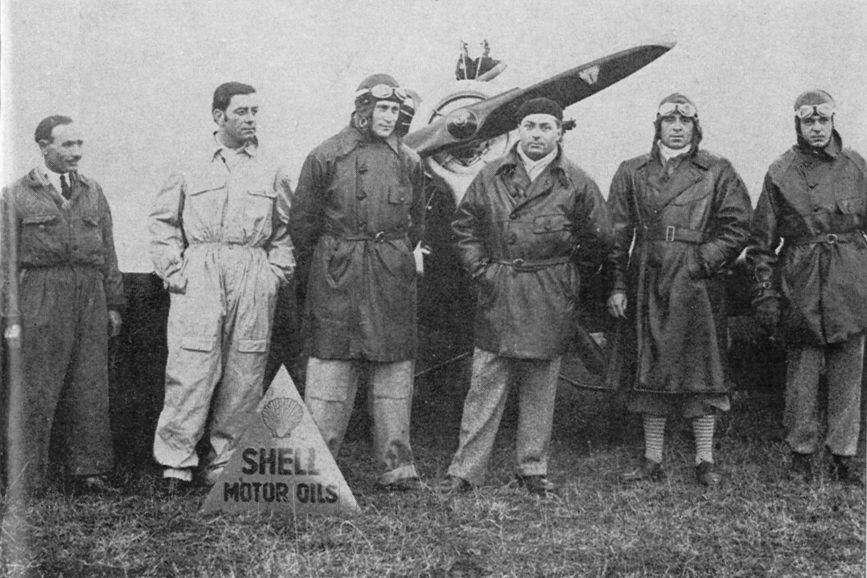
Before the flight: Ploeșteanu, Ivanovici, Davidescu, Cernescu, Manolescu, and Pantazi.

Three ICAR M23b aircraft of the ARPA, registered as YR-AAP, YR-ABL și YR-ABO, were selected to perform the tour. Through the efforts of the State Undersecretariat for Air, the fuel necessary for the tour was provided by the Astra Română refinery, and delivered by Shell. Shell also provided the documentation: air guides, newsletters and weather forecasts. The aircraft were overhauled and fitted with additional gas tanks providing an 800 km flight autonomy, improved fuel tanks, dust filters for engines. They were supplied with spare parts (even a propeller attached above the posterior fuselage of YR-AAP aircraft, as shown in the picture below) and repair kits, signaling missiles, a first aid kits, food and water supplies, 1: 1,000,000 or 1: 2,000,000-scale maps, papers, even handguns.

Lieutenant Petre Ivanovici and Max Manolescu, aerobatics pilots and flight instructors at the ARPA piloting school, as well as the aircraft technician Dumitru Ploeșteanu also took part in the team. The crews were distributed as follows: Cernescu and Manolescu on board the YR-AAP, Davidescu and Ivanovici on board the YR-ABL, and Ploeșteanu and Pantazi on board the YR-ABO.

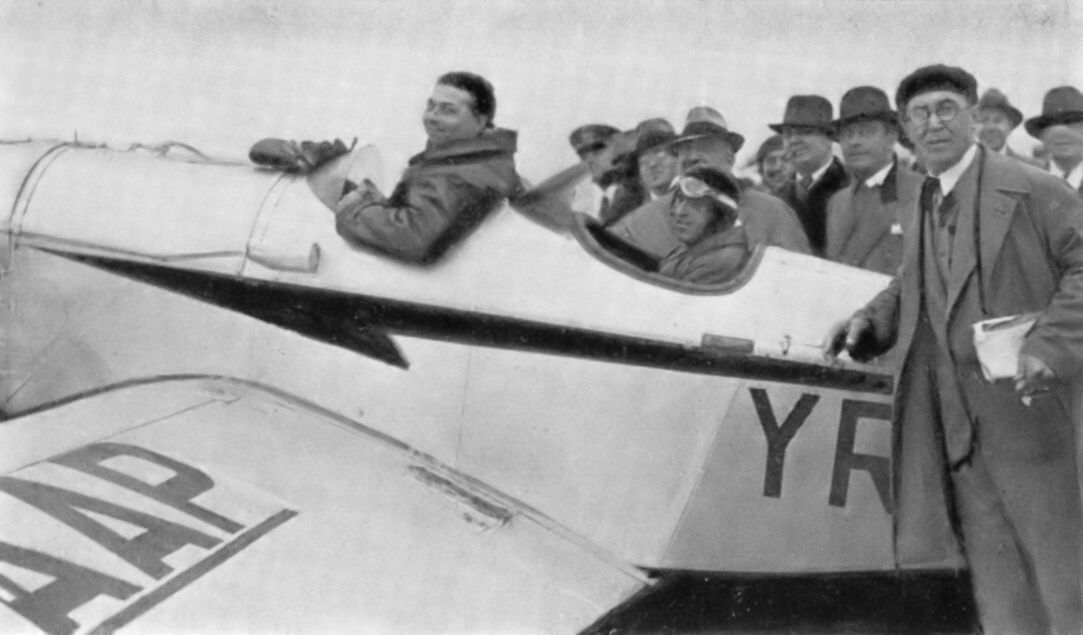
Cernescu and Manolescu

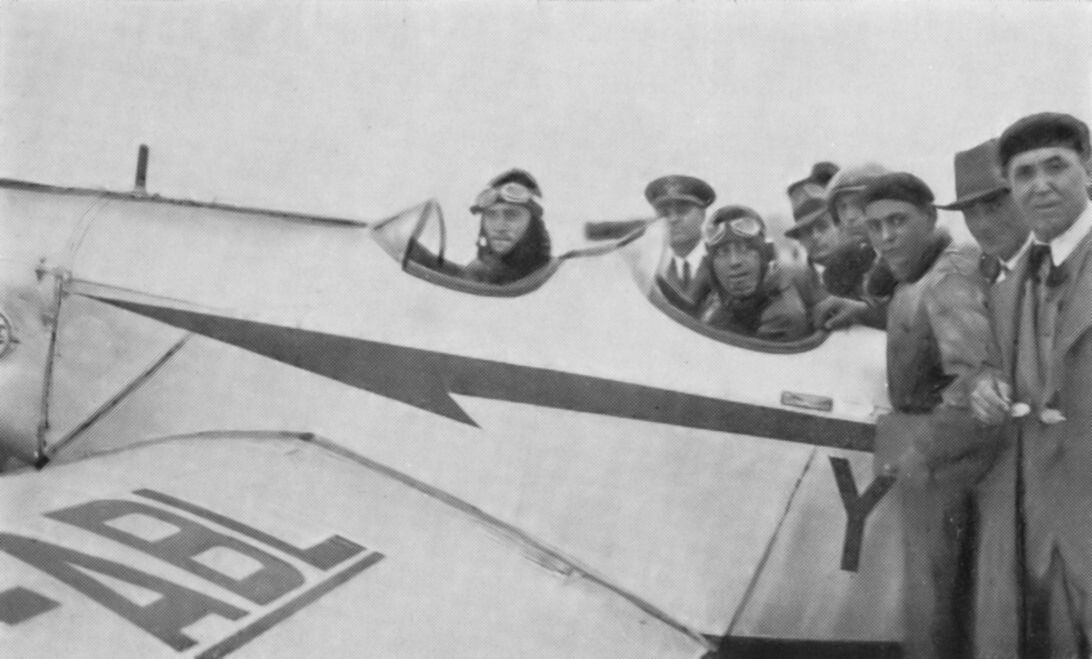
Davidescu and Ivanovici

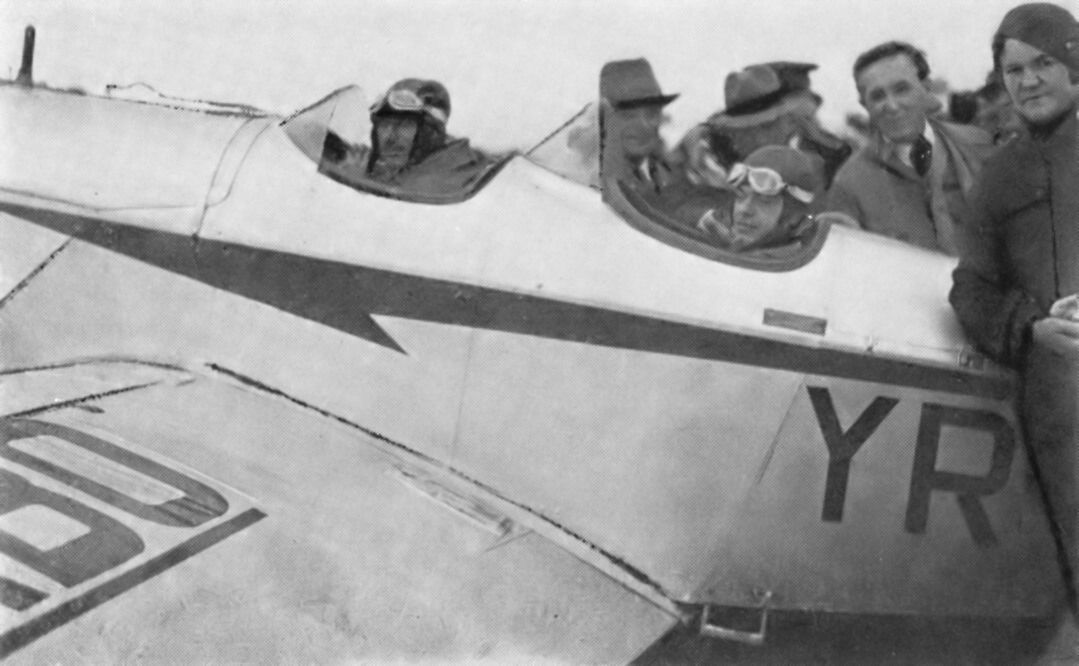
Ploeșteanu and Pantazi
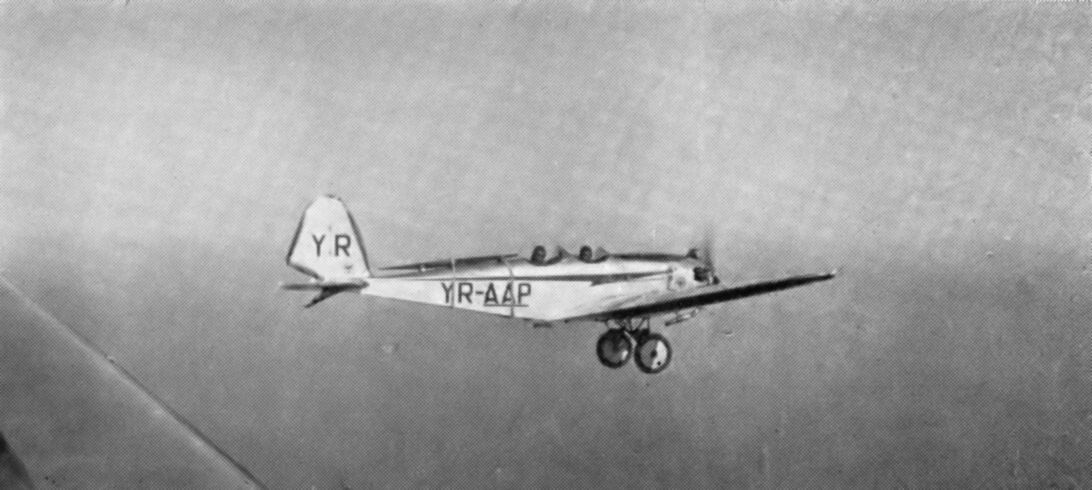
Over the Mediterranean, near Silifke

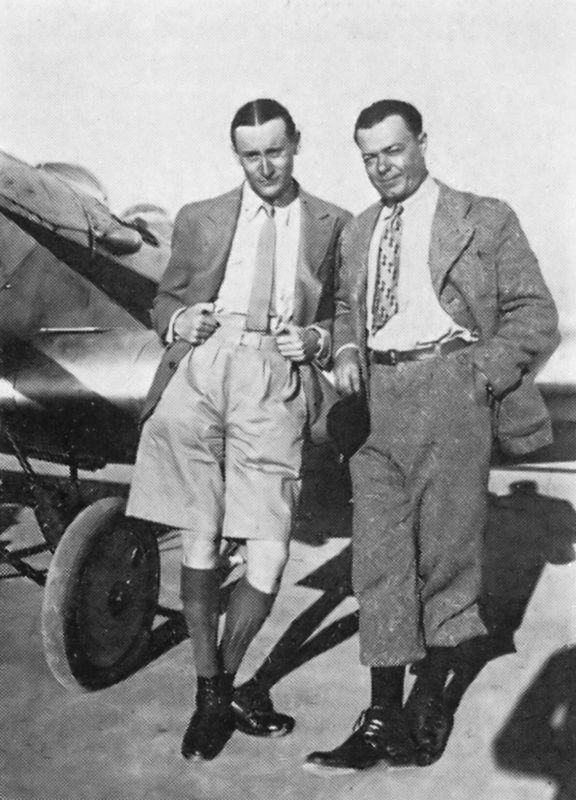
Davidescu and Pantazi in Cairo

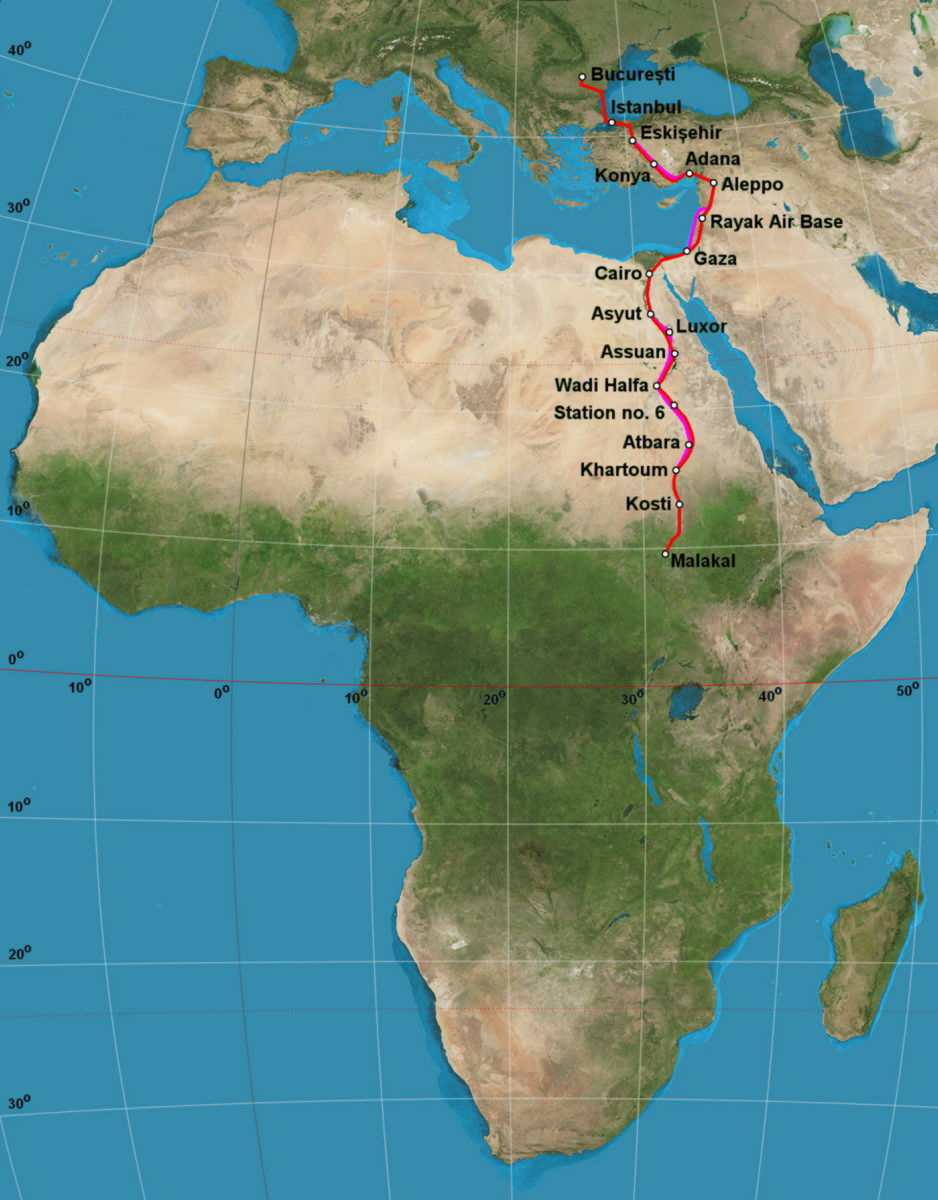
Malakal route map

The planned route of the flight was Bucharest – Istanbul – Eskişehir – Konya – Adana – Aleppo – Gaza – Cairo – Assiut – Assuan – Wadi Halfa – Atbara – Khartum – Kosti – Malakal – Juba – Kisumu – Nairobi – Moshi – Dodoma – Mbeya – Mpika – Broken Hill – Salisbury – Bulawayo – Pietersburg – Johannesburg – Kimberley – Victoria West – Cape Town and return. Some of these customs points were compulsory.

Climactically, air tours could be organized in March–April or September–October. The air tour started with enough delay, on the 22 October, because Pantazi was ill.

The one-way air route is marked in red on the map herewith. They passed through the compulsory customs points of Giurgiu, Varna and Istanbul. Because of the bad weather they stopped in Istanbul, where they visited the Galata Tower, the Pera district, Taksim Square, the ruins of the Valens Aqueduct, Hagia Sophia, Topkapı Palace, the Turkish and Islamic Arts Museum, the Military Museum, the Grand Bazaar, different mosques. On 25 October, they could hardly managed to fly over the Taurus Mountains, through a saddle at the height of 1,750 metres, which is the ceiling that loaded aircraft can reach. Then they reached the Mediterranean above Silifke (the old Seleucia). After that they flew over Mersin and had the customs formalities carried out at Adana. After flying around the Gulf of Alexandretta they landed at Aleppo. The following day they took off, flew over Baalbek and the site of the Battle of Qadesh, and stopped over at Rayak Air Base to deliver a message from the French air attaché in Bucharest. They fly through the valley of the Jordan River over Lake Tiberias. After the Dead Sea they turned to Jerusalem and reached Gaza. They entered Egypt through the compulsory customs point of El-Qantarah el-Sharqiyya, and then they landed in Cairo, where they spent three days, overhauling their aircraft and visiting the Pyramids.

The crew left Cairo on 29 October along the length of the Nile. At Assiut they met Muhammed Taher Pasha, Chairman of the Aero Club of Egypt. They flew over Abydos, the Valley of the Kings, Thebes, Luxor and Karnak and stopped at Assuan. The following day they flew over the first cataract of the Nile, the Philae Island, and hedgehopped over the temples of Ramesses II and Nefertari at Abu Simbel. They entered Sudan and stopped at the customs point of Wadi Halfa. They flew over the second cataract, then cut the meander of the Nile through the desert, along the Wadi Halfa – Abu Hamad railway line up to Railway Station No. 6, where they overnighted. The following day they flew over the fifth cataract, Atbara, and after the sixth cataract they reached Khartum, where they stayed for two days as the engine of Pantazi's aircraft needed overhauling.

After a short stage to Kosti, they reached Malakal on the 4 November, where they were caught in a torrential rain that deformed the plywood on the wings and empennage. As the aircraft could not be repaired on the spot, the pilots decided to return on the same route. Since the aircraft were lighter and thus they could fly longer routes, they chose some stops instead of others (Atbara instead of Railway Station No. 6, and Luxor instead of Assuan, respectively), and cancelled others (Assiut, Rayak, Konya), as you can see the purple marks on the map hereby. They reached Cairo on the 11 November and left on the 14 November. Due to the light aircraft they flew over the Taurus Mountains with no difficulty, and reached Bucharest on the 17 November. They flew over 10,500 km in that journey.

== Bănciulescu's tour ==
In 1933 Lieutenant colonel George Bănciulescu was Secretary General of the Royal Flight Club of Romania (ARR). He took over the position in 1927 from Commander Andrei Popovici. In this capacity he would participate, together with George Valentin Bibescu, Gheorghe Negrescu and George Constantinescu, at the 33rd General Conference of the International Aeronautical Federation (IAF), which took place in Cairo between 20 and 25 December 1933. Different air shows were planned on that occasion.

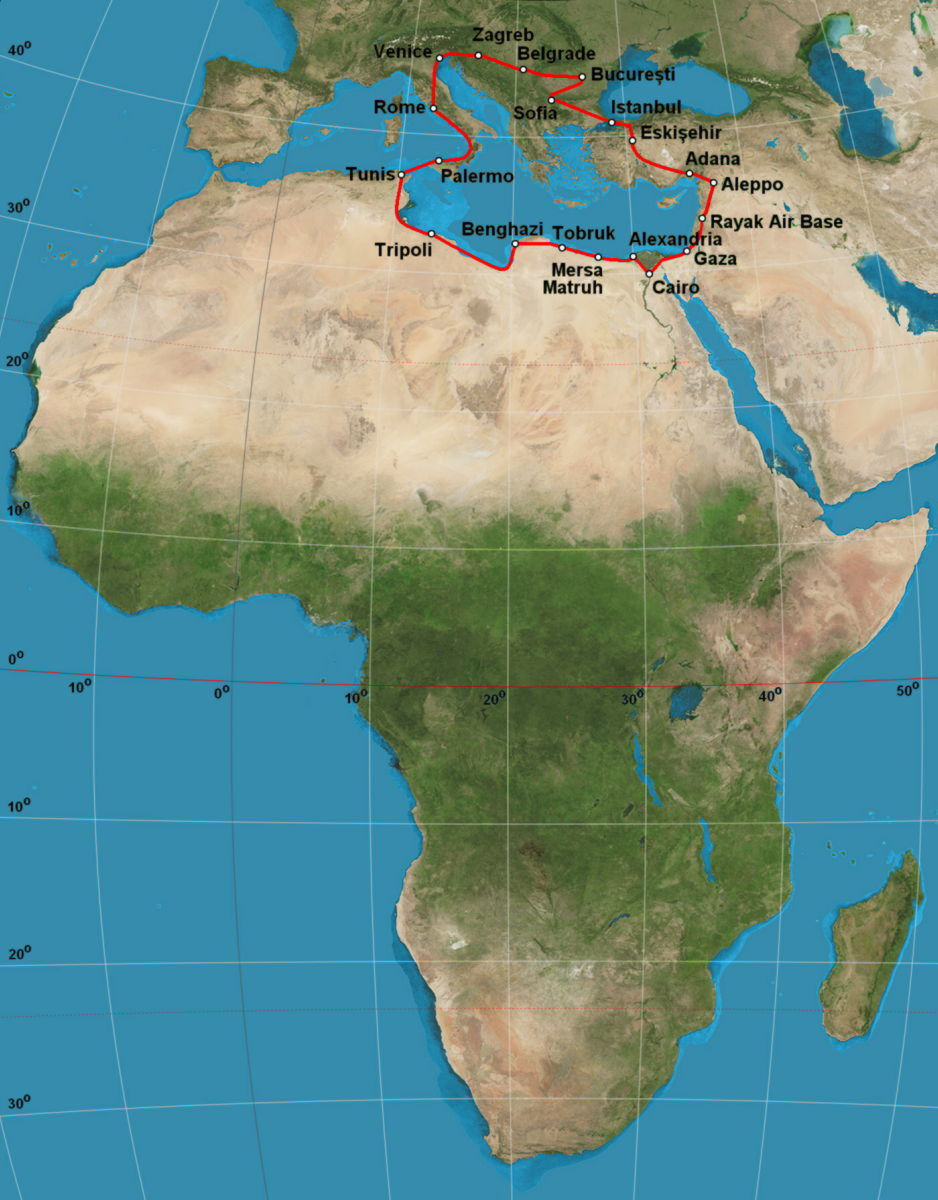
1934 tour route map

They flew the Stinson S Junior aircraft of Prince Bibescu, registered as YR-GVB, to Cairo. Martha Bibescu, the Prince's wife, also accompanied the crew.

The route was Bucharest – Sofia – Istanbul – Eskişehir – Adana – Aleppo – Rayak Air Base – Gaza – Cairo. After they took part in the conference Martha Bibescu took Bănciulescu round the Sphinx and the Pyramids. They also flew over several cities south of Cairo.

He returned alone to Bucharest, following the route: Cairo – Alexandria – Mersa Matruh – Tobruk – Benghazi – Tripoli – Tunis – Palermo – Roma – Venice – Zagreb – Belgrade – Bucharest. In the first stage, he flew to Tripoli, where he received a glorious welcome. Crossing over the Mediterranean from Tripoli to Palermo lasted three hours. He flew at a low altitude because of the fog. The stage was very dangerous, and no matter how high he had flown higher, an engine breakdown of a single-engined aircraft would have caused a fatal alighting, due to the long flight of about 150 km over the water between the Cape Bon and Marsala. The stage ended in Rome. The following day he took off at 5.00 a.m. and reached Bucharest after stopping at Lido di Venezia, Zagreb and Belgrade, being welcomed enthusiastically all over the place.

== Burnaia and Ivanovici's tour ==
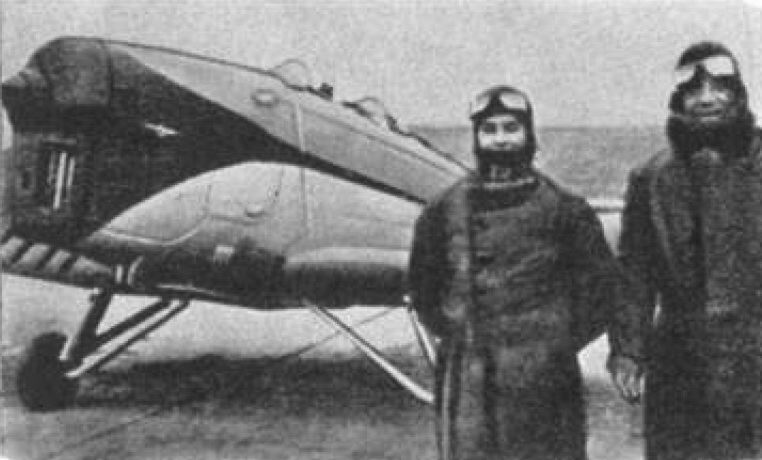
Burnaia and Ivanovici before departure

Irina Burnaia also wanted to fly her own IAR-22 aircraft, registered as YR-INA, over Cape Town. Thus, she asked Petre Ivanovici, who had taken part in the tour of 1933, to make the crew. Then, she ordered an aircraft set of spare parts which were to be delivered to Cairo.

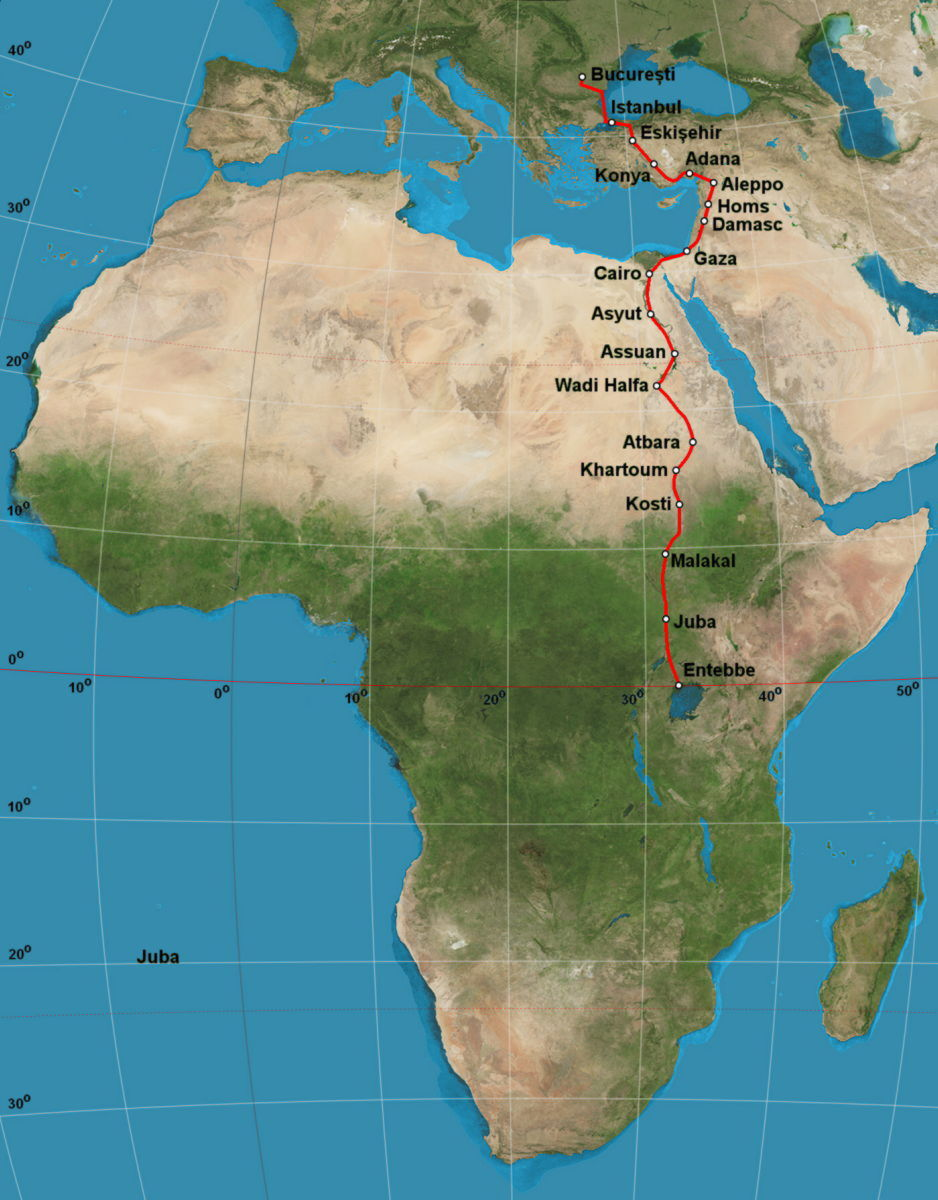
Burnaia–Ivanovici route map

Then they planned the itinerary: Bucharest – Istanbul – Eskişehir – Konya – Adana – Aleppo – Damascus – Gaza – Cairo – Assiut – Assuan – Wadi Halfa – Atbara – Khartum – Malakal – Juba – Entebbe – Nairobi – Dodoma – Mbeya – Mpika – Broken Hill – Salisbury – Bulawayo – Pietersburg – Johannesburg – Kimberley – Victoria West – Cape Town and return.

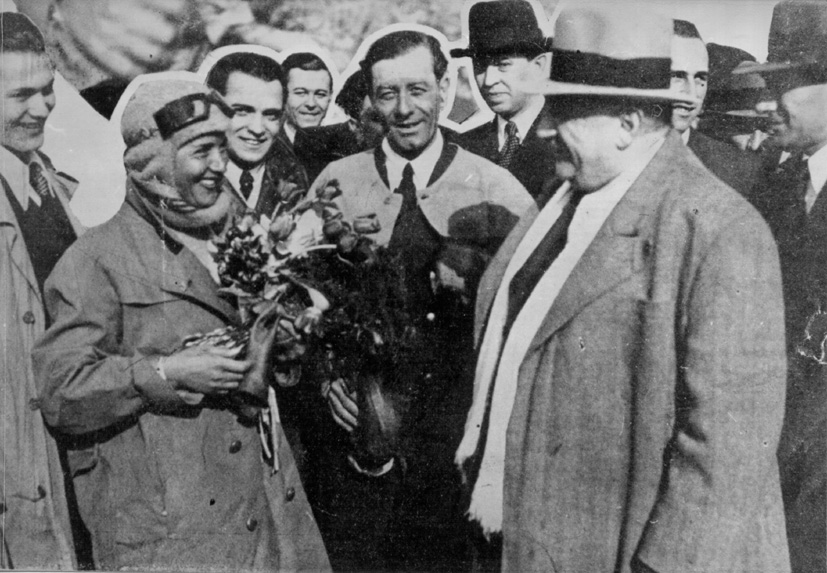
Burnaia and Ivanovici on their return from the tour

The crew left the Băneasa airport at 10.00 in the morning on 3 January. During the flight, there were many mechanical failures and difficult taking off from Aleppo, where the ground is soft. Moreover, at Damascus, Ivanovici had a fever for a few days, which delayed so much their arrival in Cairo, on 12 February, where they stayed for eight days to have the aircraft overhauled. They continued the flight on 20 February flying over Luxor. They only took off from Assuan and Juba at 4.00 in the morning because of the hot weather. They took off from Entebbe, which is at an altitude of 1,150 metres, only after five days, with favourable wind. They decided to discontinue the flight, because Nairobi is located even higher, at 1,700 metres altitude, but they still flew over Lake Victoria up to the Equator. They had the aircraft as light as possible, by sending their stuff to Cairo with the Imperial Airways, and by supplying with fuel to only reach Juba. They stayed in Cairo for five days to make a complete overhauling and repainting of the aircraft. They were prevented from taking off from Haifa because of the rainfalls. They reached Băneasa back at 4.00 in the 24—March afternoon. The air raid lasted for 80 days as a whole, out of which only 16 days of flight, the rest being delays. In total, they flew over 12,000 km.

== Bănciulescu and Bibescu's tour ==
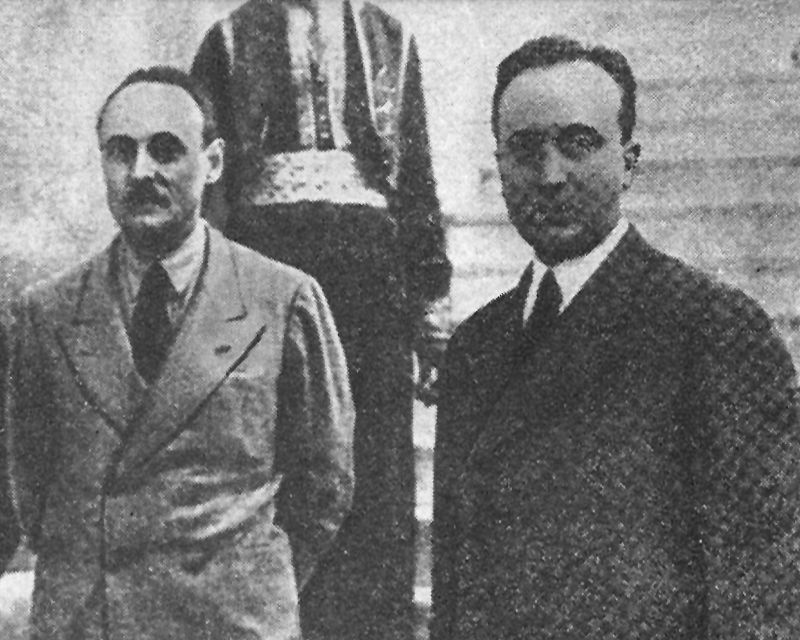
Bibescu and Bănciulescu in Cairo, 17 March 1935

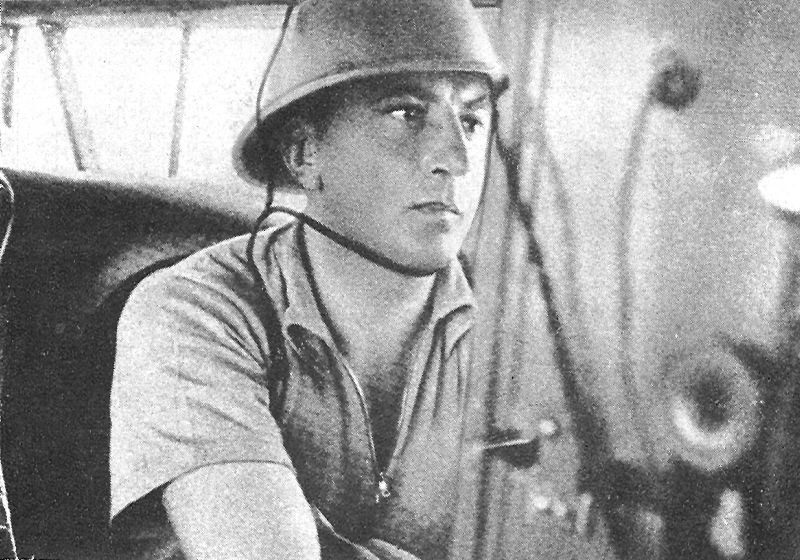
Louis Agnus on board the Potez 561 aircraft

In 1934 Air France intended to open some air routes to Southern Africa, Madagascar and Syria, by using the territory of the French colonial empire in Africa. Edmond Giscard d'Estaing, Chief of the French Minister for Air, and General Victor Denain, drew up a list of the pilots who could explore the least-known equatorial region of Africa. The list also included George Valentin Bibescu, Chief of the IAF at that time, and Bănciulescu, who was Bibescu's suggestion. The third member of the crew was Louis Agnus, Air France's radiotelegraphist and mechanic.

The air tour was to be conducted by Bibescu's Potez 561 aircraft, registered as YR-FAI. The aircraft, new, had been equipped by the plants of Potez in Méaulte, which also installed an English aircraft radio. Bănciulescu flew training routes to London or Nuremberg with those aircraft of Air France. The aircraft were brought to Paris on 8 March.

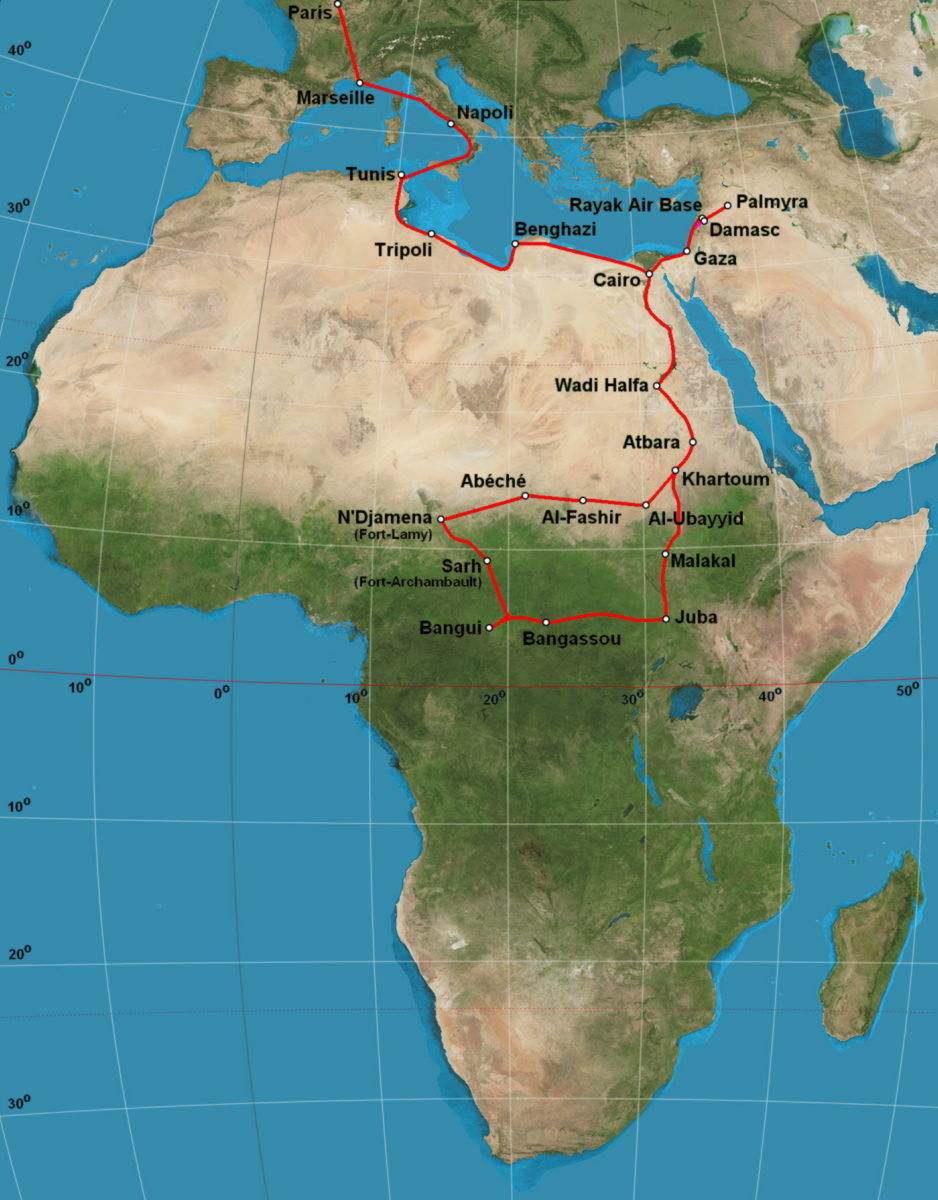
Bănciulescu–Bibescu's route map

The route was: Paris – Marsilia – Naples – Tunis – Tripoli – Bengazi – Cairo – Wadi Halfa – Khartum – Al-Fashir – Abéché – Fort-Lamy – Fort-Archambault – Bangui – Bangassou – Juba – Malakal – Atbara – Cairo – Gaza – Rayak Air Base – Damascus – Palmyra – Gaza – Cairo.

The air tour, which began on 13 March 1935, had the first stop at Marseille. The following day they flew 1,700 km to Tunis, of which 600 km were flown over the Mediterranean Sea. They reached Benghazi on 15 March, and Cairo on the following day. They continued the journey on 18 March, when they flew 2,000 km to Khartum, with a stop at Wadi Halfa for getting fuel and had the customs formalities carried out. On 19 March they flew over the desert of Sudan and Al-Ubayyid and reached Al-Fashir. The following day, in heavy torrential rains, they reached the most western point of the air tour, Fort-Lamy in Chad, after a layover at Abéché. They also flew in the rain from here to Fort-Archambault over Fort Brettonet and then over Fort Crampel to Bangui. The storm forced them to deviate from the route, so they reached the Oubangui River near Kouango, from where they headed for Bangui. Here they rested for two days. On 24 March they reached Bangassou, where they explored landing grounds. They reached Juba on the following rainy day, and after another day, on a suffocating weather, they flew 1,300 km to Atbara, with a single layover at Malakal. On 27 March, on the route to Wadi Halfa, they reached Cairo through a sandy storm which could have affected their engines. They had flown about 22,000 km altogether.

All that was left was the route to Syria. They took off for Rayak on 30 March, after they had rested for two days. They reached Damascus on 31 March, and Palmyra on 1 April, where they stayed for a while before they took off for Gaza over Haifa. On 2 April, they reached Cairo. Bănciulescu felt sick.

== Bucharest – Cape Town tour ==
The experience of the 1933 air tour shown that there was a need for aircraft engines more powerful than the Siemens-Halske Sh 13b of 80 HP. The organizers of the flight proposed the Fleet F-10G or the ICAR Universal Biloc aircraft, which had 130 HP engines, and the Air Force Commander suggested the SET 7K aircraft, which was a more powerful metallic biplane of 420 HP. The State Under-Secretary for Air chose the ICAR's. They were fitted with extra petrol tanks, improved oil radiators, ballon tyres, dérivomètres, and instruments for flight with no visibility. As a result, the flight ceiling dropped from 5,500 m to 4,000 m, but the payload increased by 165 kg, and the flight autonomy tripled. In order to simplify the flight procedure, the aircraft got civil registrations, namely: YR-ACK, YR-ACL and YR-ACM. The resources needed for the flight were provided by the City Hall of Bucharest, which offered 950,000 lei out of 1,100,000, of which about 850,000 were destined for gasoline and oil, and the State Undersecretariat for Air, which supplied the planes and provided the remaining 150,000 lei.

The six participants to the air tour were Lieutenant colonel Alexandru Cernescu, Lieutenant colonel George Davidescu, Lieutenant colonel Mihail Pantazi, colonel (Note: Equivalent to Group captain) Gheorghe Jienescu, Captain Gheorghe Olteanu and the aircraft technician Anton Stengher. The crews were formed in such a way that in each of them there was participant of the 1933 air tour. Davidescu and Jienescu were on board the YR-ACK, Cernescu and Olteanu, on board the YR-ACL, while Pantazi and Stenger flew the YR-ACM.

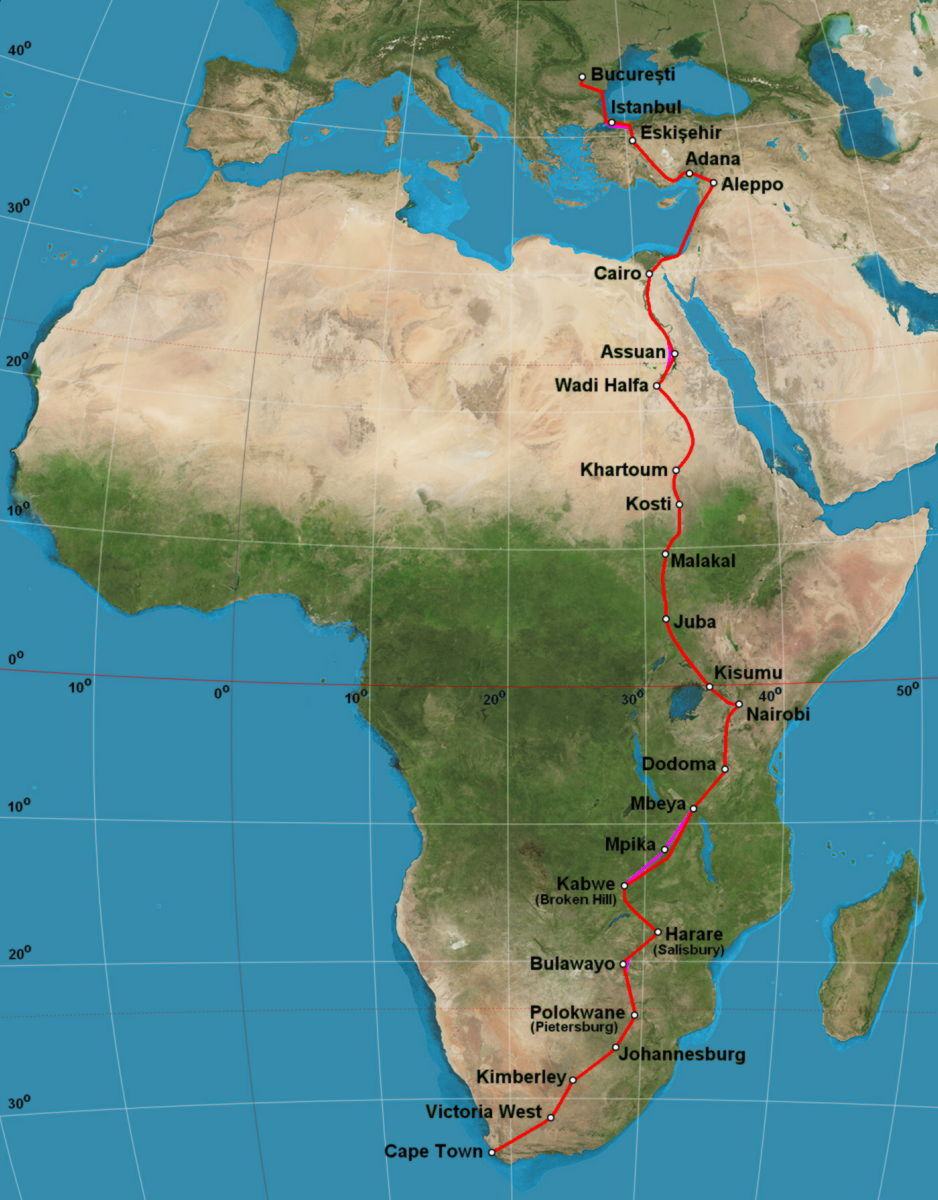
Cape Town route map

Those stages could be longer due to the greater flight autonomy of the aircraft. The itinerary was: Bucharest – Istanbul – Eskişehir – Adana – Aleppo – Cairo – Assuan – Wadi Halfa – Khartum – Kosti – Malakal – Juba – Kisumu – Nairobi – Dodoma – Mbeya – Mpika – Broken Hill – Salisbury – Bulawayo – Pietersburg – Johannesburg – Kimberley – Victoria West – Cape Town and return. As the experience of the 1933 tour showed, the September–October period was not the best period for flying, that is why they made the decision to perform the tour in April.

Thus, they left Bucharest at an early hour on 4 April and followed the same route as in 1933, but they had a layover in Istanbul, and flew without a stop from Eskişehir to Adana. To save time, they cut across the Gulf of Alexandretta on the following day, had the customs formalities carried out at Aleppo, and flew straight to Cairo, over the Lebanon Mountains, Tripoli, the Mediterranean Sea to reach El Arish and El Kantara. The next day they removed the old wooden propellers in Cairo, and replaced them with metal Hamilton ones (produced by Fleet), because they had seen some cracks on the old ones. The operating cost was high. They flew to Assuan on the old route on the very day. They reached Khartum on 17 April, and the following day flew over Malakal to reach Juba. Thus, the route became longer than in 1933.

Then they left the Nile and flew non-stop to Kisumu, over Lira, Lake Kioga, Tororo, and the Kavirondo Gulf, an extension of Lake Victoria, as the compass showed. And later that same day, they flew to Nairobi, by passing over the south of the Mau Escarpment. Nairobi airport was the highest airport on the route, reaching an altitude of 1,700 m. In Nairobi, they met Captain Caspareuthus (see above), a line pilot who flew a four-engined Atalanta aircraft, who would help them several times during the flight. They flew over Lake Manyara and Lake Natron and had a layover at Dodoma for refuelling, where they were reached by Caspareuthus, who had had a stop at Moshi. They had to use a compass to fly through a mountain passage to Mbeya. Caspareuthus drew up the route on a business card, but as they were lucky to get to the crossing simultaneously with Atalanta, this one was their guide.

On 21 April they took off from Mbeya with the intention of flying to Mpika, but due to a wrong heading they turned east. They realized the error when the time indicated that they had exceed Mpika, but they recognized the Lavushi Manda mountain at about 20 km on their right-side, at which height they actually had to fly. They looked around, corrected the heading and reached Broken Hill. In order not to get lost again, instead of flying directly to Salisbury, they flew along the railways to Lusaka and then along the Zambezi River. The leading crew of the formation, Cernescu and Olteanu, dive in their attempt to recognize an auxiliary landing field, the next (Davidescu and Jienescu) followed it, but the third (Stengher and Pantazi), which had fallen behind, did not catch sight of them and flew forward and even "put on steam" thinking that they was long behind. They lost each other, only the first two aircraft reaching Salisbury. The airport employees worried about that, Caspareuthus and the Interior Minister (!) suggested to look for it, but they decided to wait until the following day. On the morning of 22 April, Pantazi's engine could be heard. Pantazi and Stengher had spent the night on an auxiliary landing field near Zambezi, waiting for them to pass. Being excited, they decided to no longer fly the following day, thus dropping off the "timetable".

On 23 April, they took off for Pietersburg, but a gasoline leak on the aircraft of Davidescu and Jienescu forced them to land at Bulawayo, which they only intended to fly over. They were greeted by the family of a Romanian man married to an Englishwoman and their two daughters, who were waiting for them without knowing that they would not have landed if it had not been for the malfunction. After repairing the tank they reached Pietersburg. Because it was already night, they could not fly to Johannesburg, as they intended. The following day they landed at the Rand Airport near Johannesburg. The navigation was easy, using the railways as landmarks. They flew over Bothaville, Hoopstad and arrived at Kimberley. During the last stage they stopped at Wictoria West to chill off their bones, as it was a very cold weather of late autumn, then passed north the Hex River Mountains, and reached Cape Town on 25 April, where they were greeted by the commander of the airport, Romania's General Consul, the Swiss consul, a journalist and a photographer.

They rested in Cape Town for three days, while they visited the city and the officials. On 30 April, they left for the country on the same route. On their return, they had the opportunity to visit the De Beers in Kimberley, where they saw diamonds and brilliants. Then there came the Johannesburg and Pietersburg stages. After they took off from Pietersburg, they found out that Davidescu and Jienescu's aircraft was losing gas again, so they returned. As the tank could only be repaired at the workshops of Imperial Airways in Johannesburg, Davidescu had to make a night train journey. Caspareuthus brought them luck again, as he asked Davidescu to join him in the co-pilot's seat, because there was no seat left. Caspareuthus deviated again from the route to show Davidescu around Pretoria at night. In Johannesburg, Davidescu was invited to visit the two local flight clubs in Germiston and Baragwanath until the tank was repaired. Caspareuthus himself took him back, so on 4 May they were ready to fly for Salisbury. In the following stage, they were determined to pinpoint Mpika. Although they were flying with the compass again, that time they were no longer wrong and made it back home. The stages followed with no incidents, but in Nairobi, they had to stop because Stenger had malaria. They had to spend four days in Nairobi, while visiting the Southern Game Reserve.

On 13 May, they continued the flight, and on the following day, they flew over the Bujagali Falls from where they reached Juba. After taking off from Malakal, the tank of the YR-ACK sprang a leak again, which forced them to land at Kosti. They patched the tank, and they patched it again more or less at Khartum. That patch lasted until they flew from Wadi Hatfa, that is why the crew had to pump gas manually every five minutes for five and a half hour to Cairo. They reached Cairo at 11.30, on 18 May, where they asked for another tank to be delivered from Romania, which would come in three days. Meanwhile, they visited the museums and the Step Pyramid of Saqqara. They left Cairo on 22 May, but they encountered another problem: at Adana they found out that the upper struts of the unlucky YR-ACK aircraft's fuselage were cracked. They improvised a patching and, in order not to overload the aircraft's tail, they got the approval of not landing in Istanbul, and had the customs formalities carried out at Eskişehir. They reached Băneasa on 25 May, where they were greeted by the crowd and officials: General Paul Angelescu (Defence Minister), General Radu Irimescu and Nicolae Caranfil (the former and current State Under-Secretary for Air), George Valentin Bibescu (President of The International Aeronautical Federation), Al. Gh. Donescu (Mayor of the Capital), General Ion Sichitiu, (Commander of the Royal Air Force of Romania), etc. They were led to the Royal Palace immediately, where they received the Golden Cross of the Order of Aeronautical Virtue from King Carol.

Altogether, the air tour lasted for 27 days, 149 hours and 10 minutes, of which the 23,000 km of actual flight were flown in 73 hours and 5 minutes. The flight in Africa was considered one of the greatest successes of the Romanian aviation.

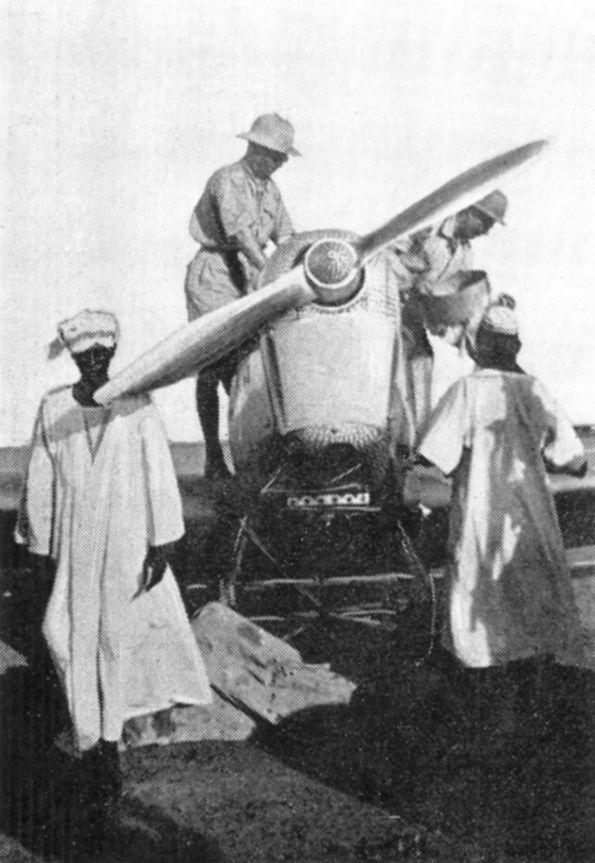
Fuelling at Wadi Halfa

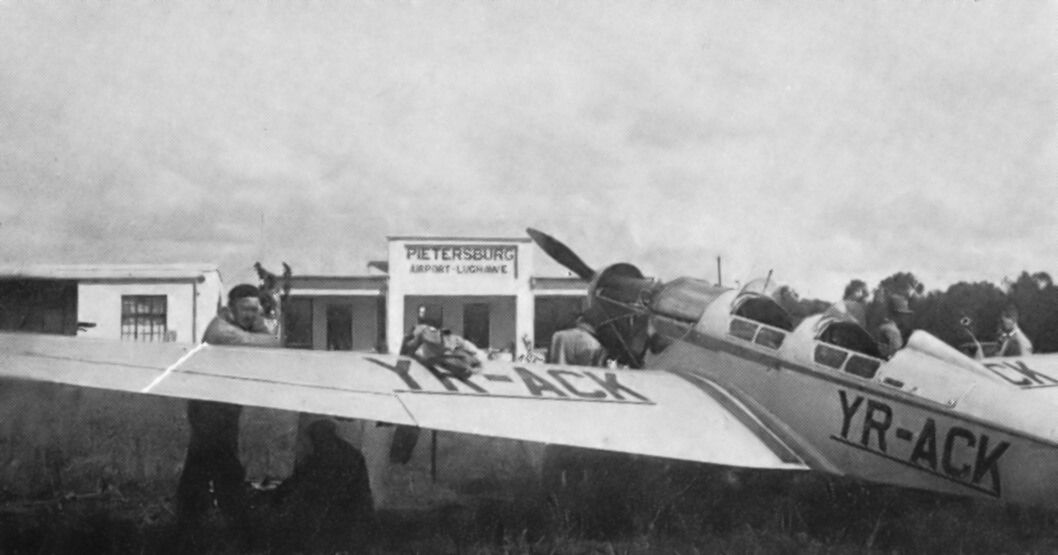
At Pietersburg

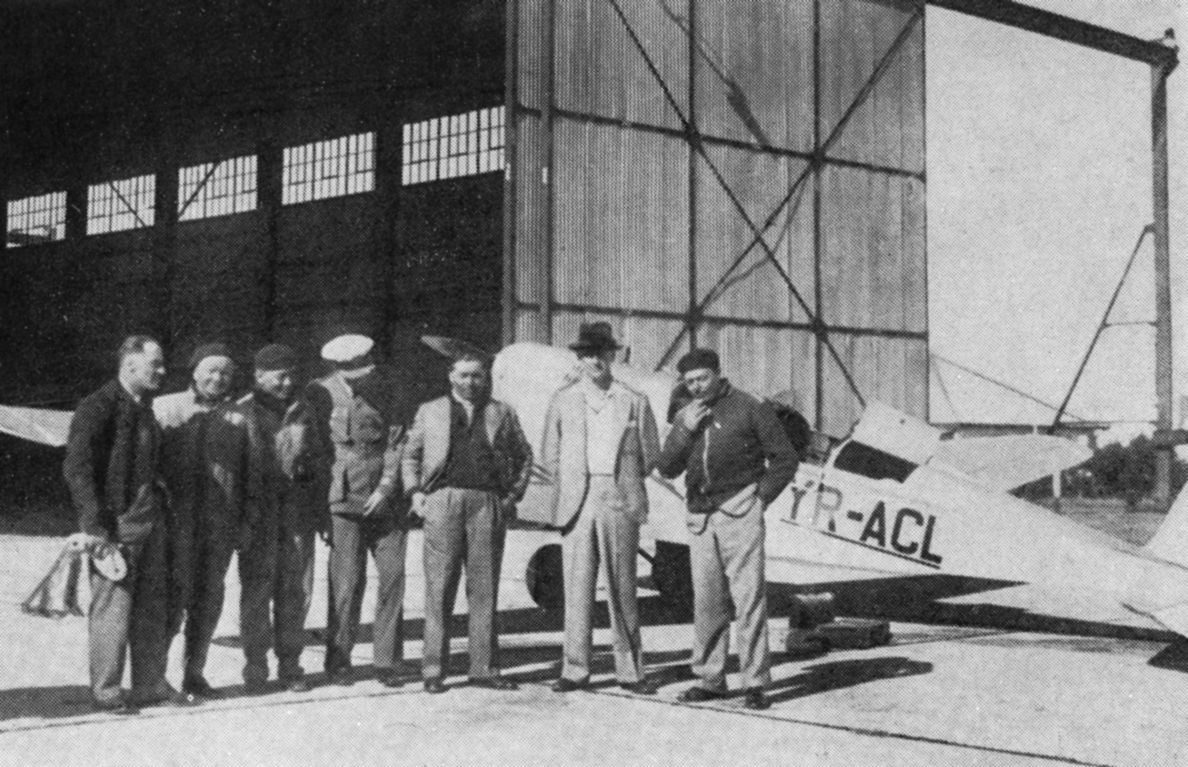
At Kimberley^{†}

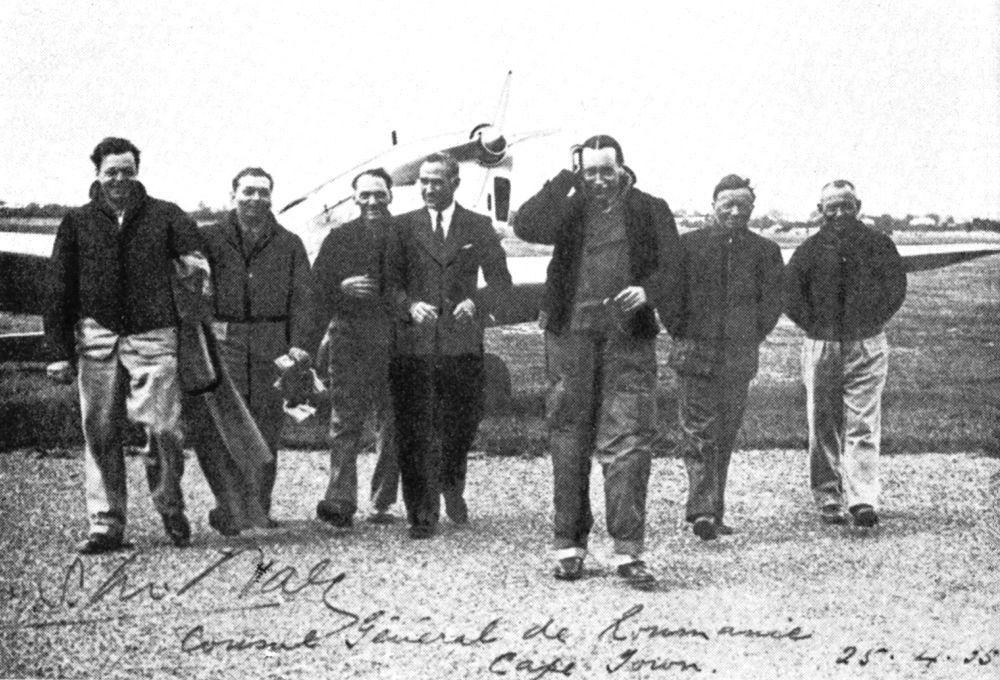
At Cape Town^{‡}

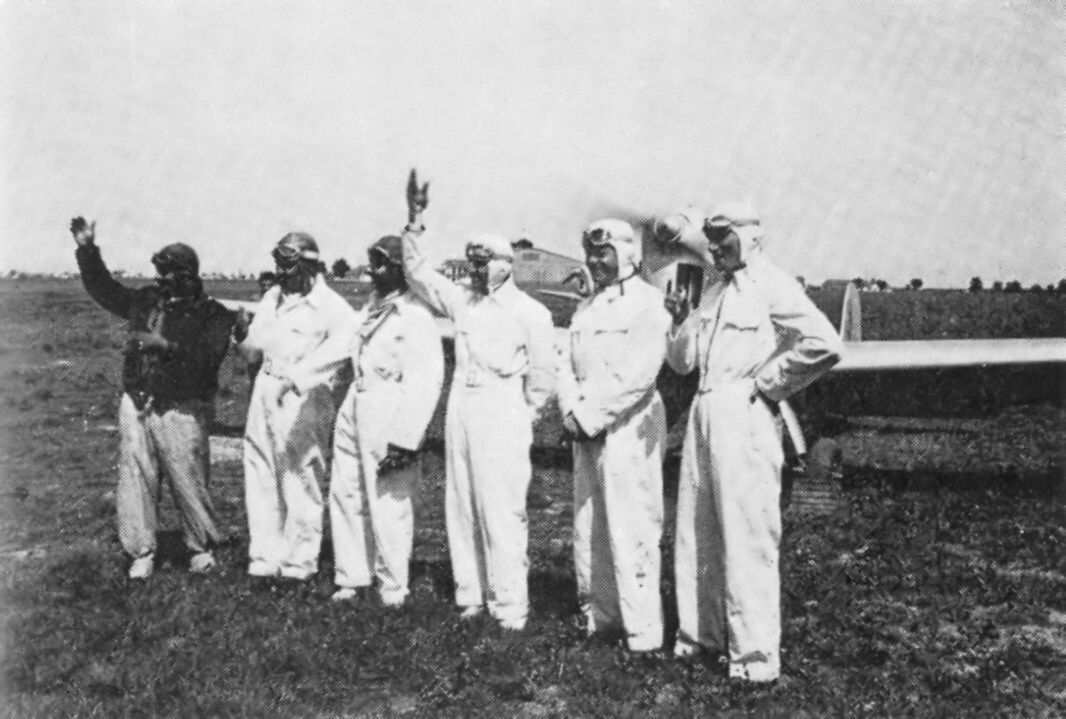
On arriving at Bucharest

^{†} At Kimberley airport, left to right: Stengher, Olteanu, Jienescu, Captain Fisher – Chief of Airport, Cernescu, Davidescu, Pantazi.
^{‡} On arriving at Cape Town, left to right: Pantazi, Cernescu, Jienescu, Consul General of Romania in Cape Town, Davidescu, Olteanu and Stengher.

== Romanian air tours in the press ==
Bănciulescu's tour in Cairo was reported in the article Un raid aviatic de propagandă (transl. A Propaganda Air Tour) issued by the Universul.

The air tour conducted by Bănciulescu and Bibescu was reported by newspapers such as the US publications Observer-Dispatch, Oshkosh Northwestern and Standard-Examiner, which highlighted the success of the Romanian-French crew, putting it in contrast to the accident of a similar mission carried out by Édouard Renard (1883-1935), General Governor of French Equatorial Africa, who, together with his wife and five companions, crashed down in the jungle of Congo on 15 March 1935. The press reported that the route to Juba had been flown for the first time. The flight logbook had been handed over to Air France, as part of the contract, whereas a copy of it and a huge set of photographs had been sent to Renée Bănciulescu-Cozadini, (Bănciulescu's daughter) by Louis Agnus. The logbook was included in the book „Și totuși voi mai zbura...” (transl. I Will Fly Again…). Yet the news was overshadowed by Bănciulescu's death.

The departure for Malakal was reported by issue No. 352/1933 of Realitatea Ilustrată (transl. The Illustrated Reality), and the arrival by issue No. 356/1933 of the same publication, which published a photograph of Prince Michael congratulating Davidescu. Realitatea Ilustrată also published the sequence „Jurnal de bord din raidul Bucharest–Malakal” (transl. The Logbook of the Bucharest–Malakal Air Tour) in issues No. 357–361.

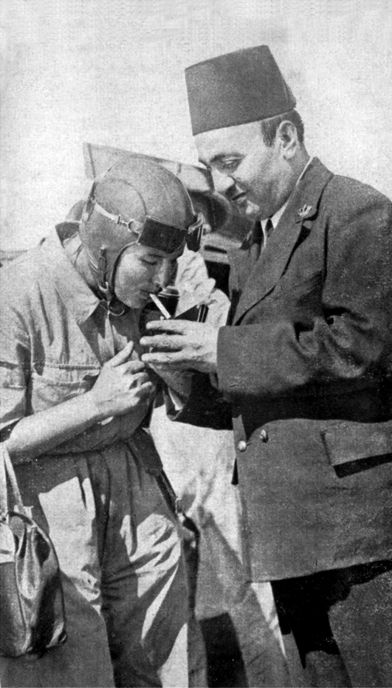
Photo appearing on the cover of the Realitatea Ilustrată magazine No. 429/1935

Being an unprecedented event, Irina Burnaia's air tour aroused much interest in the press. Thus, the cover of issue No. 429/10 April 1935 of Realitatea Ilustrată reported that the logbook of the flight conducted by Burnaia and Ivanovici would be published soon. In this respect, a series of articles with the title "Recorduri Bărbătești, Recorduri Femenine"' (transl. Male's Records, Female's Records) reported the tour in issues No. 431, 432, 433, 435 and 436. Also, there were issued such articles as "De vorbă cu aviatoarea Burnaia – povestirea unui raid îndrăzneț" (transl. Chatting with the Pilot Burnaia: the story of a Daring Tour) or "Cum a decurs raidul aviatorilor Irina Burnaia – Petre Ivanovici" (transl. How Pilots Irina Burnaia and Petre Ivanovici Conducted Their Tour). Nevertheless, many newspapers reported the flight icily. In the chapter "Fierbe cazanul satanei" (transl. Satan's Cauldron is Boiling) of her book with the title Aripile mele (transl. My Wings), Burnaia talked about the absurd allegations published in the press which told that they would have travelled without passports, or they would not have had trespassed licences, or would have brought negative publicity to Industria Aeronautică Română (IAR). Yet, Vasile Damaschin's article, "Faimosul raid Burnaia" (transl. Burnaia's Famous Air Tour), was the most virulent, which insinuated that the flight had been nothing but a romance between a "blonde" woman – although she said she had neither blonde nor oxygenated hair – and a "kept man", who lived on the public dole, "collected by blows and by tucks of drum from the widows with seven children, from the clerks, from the miserable peasants, from the workers…". The further enquiry proved these statements to be untrue, and showed that the funds came from selling some properties in Teleorman County. All this gossip was responded by C. A. Orășanu in the Universul and Ion Dumitrescu in his article called "Pilotajul cancanurilor" (transl. Piloting Gossip) in particular, and later also by Cornel Marandiuc in his article "Cum a fost ucisă Ileana Cosânzeana – lecturând «Aviatoarele României – Din înaltul cerului în beciurile Securității»" (transl. How Goldilocks was Killed – Reading «Romania's Women Pilots – From Above the Sky Into the Cellars of the Securitate»).

The air tour conducted to Cape Town enjoyed a wide recognition in Romania, in newspapers such as Universul, Unirea Poporului (transl. The Union of the People). Also, in 1975, Colonel Paul Baltagi wrote his book called Avioane românești străbat Africa (transl. Romanian Aircraft over Africa), based on the logbook of the raids conducted to Malakal and Cape Town and also on Davidescu's memories; the co-authors Alexandru Cernescu and George Davidescu were deceased at the time.

== The aviators ==
=== George Valentin Bibescu ===
George Valentin Bibescu (1880–1941) founded the Romanian Flight Club in 1909, and the National Air League in 1912. Between 1911 and 1912 he commanded the Cotroceni Flight School. Between 1930 and 1941, he was President of The International Aeronautical Federation (I.A.F.).

=== Gheorghe Bănciulescu ===
Gheorghe Bănciulescu (1898–1935) flew for the first time in 1919. On 12 September 1926, while flying in the fog close to Rýmařov, he hit Hirshbrun Mount, and lost both legs below the knees in the accident. Following that accident, he learned to fly by means of prosthetic legs and resumed the flight in 1927, which had him decorated with the Legion of Honour for this reason. As General Secretary of the Aeronautica Regala Română (transl. Romanian Royal Aeronautics), he took part in the conferences of I.A.F. and promoted the Romanian aviation by performing several air tours in Europe and Africa. In the last one, the flight of 1935 in Africa, he caught tropical flu which proved fatal to him.

=== Louis Agnus ===
He was a mechanic and on-board radiotelegraphist. He had already flown over 1,000,000 km in 1936, being awarded by Air France and decorated by Legion of Honour. After retiring, he settled to his farm in Amboise.

=== Alexandru Cernescu ===
Alexandru Cernescu (19 December 1896 – 4 January 1971, Bucharest) became a second lieutenant on 1 July 1916, lieutenant on 1 September 1917, captain in April 1920, major on 1 May 1931, lieutenant colonel on 1 January 1937, colonel on 6 June 1940, and brigadier in 1944. He attended the flight school and got pilot licence No. 226/6.06.1921 and an observer licence on 24 November 1922. In July 1931, he flew 3,000 km, together with officers of the Bucharest Military School of Aviation - Haralambie Giossanu (school commander in 1931–1932), Lieutenant Colonel Cernescu, Lieutenant Nicolae Balotescu (school commander in 1946–1948), Rudolf Malinovschi and Gheorghe Nicolau – who flew five Potez 25 aircraft built at IAR Braşov. The route was Bucharest – Lviv – Warsaw – Gdynia – Bydgoszcz – Poznań – Dęblin – Lviv – Bucharest. During the air raids in Africa he was a flight instructor at the Tecuci Military Piloting School, and held the rank of lieutenant colonel. He also held important offices in aeronautics.

=== George Davidescu ===
George Davidescu (27 February 1897 – 20 October 1972, Bucharest). had the nickname "Englezul" (transl. The Englishman) due to his elegance and calm. From the rank of Commodore – an aviation degree, ranked between Colonel and Brigadier, Davidescu advanced to the ranks of Second Lieutenant on 1 June 1917, Lieutenant on 1 September 1919, Captain on 28 September 1926, Major on 1 January 1934, Lieutenant colonel on 6 June 1938, Colonel on 10 May 1941. He worked at the General Inspectorate of Aeronautics and the State Undersecretariat for Air, which became the Ministry of Air and Navy Forces in 1935. As Commander of the Military Aviation School, he was Chief of Ion Antonescu's military cabinet in 1943. He subsequently held the position of Director of Civil Aviation. He did not fight on the frontlines.

=== Mihail Pantazi ===
Mihail Pantazi (1897–1936), was an artillery officer, later an airman. He fought in the First World War. After the war, he taught the aircraft engines and was one of those who created The Romanian Association for the Promotion of Aviation (ARPA). He took part in numerous aerobatic shows, and was one of the first members of the Red Devils formation. He took part in the 1933 and 1934 air tours in Africa.

=== Gheorghe Jienescu ===
Gheorghe Jienescu (1894–1971) was at first an infantry officer, then an airman. He fought in the World War I. After the war, he was a flight instructor at the Tecuci Military Piloting School, with the rank of captain in 1926. In 1934, Lieutenant colonel Jienescu was appointed Commander of the Battle Fleet of the Hunting and Attack Aircraft. In 1940, when Commander, he became Chief of Staff of the Air Force. Between 1941 and 1944, he was Under-Secretary of State at the Ministry of National Defence for Air in Ion Antonescu's Governments. After the war, he was sentenced to prison.

=== Gheorghe Olteanu ===
Gheorghe Olteanu (13 May 1902, Sebeș – 29 July 1936, Băneasa) got a pilot license in 1923. In July 1931, when Lieutenant, he and Major Aviator Cezar Ştiubei ranked second in a European air tour attended by 35 competitors from 8 countries: Belgium, Czechoslovakia, Switzerland, France, Germany, Italy, Poland and Romania. Also in 1931, flying a Potez aircraft along with Captain Aviator Ion Drăgan, he won the Yearly Roma–Bucharest Cup. He was deployed in the Civil aviation as a line pilot, being very good at keeping heading on landless flight. Captain Olteanu died in a plane crash in 1936.

=== Irina Burnaia ===
Irina Burnaia (1909–1997), a lawyer at the Ilfov bar, obtained civil pilot certificate No. 3/27.10.1933. A passionate flighter, she took part in several air raids and demonstrations. In the World War II she headed a transport squadron to Odessa as a commander.

=== Petre Ivanovici ===
Petre Ivanovici (1898–1936) was a flight instructor at the Romanian (Military) Training Center of the Romanian Aeronautics in Tecuci and the Civil Flight School of ARPA. He performed numerous air shows, as one of the initial members of the Red Devils crew. Beginning with 1935 he was a line pilot of SARTA.

=== Max Manolescu ===
Max Manolescu (1902–1985) was a flight instructor at the Romanian Training Center of the Romanian Aeronautics in Tecuci too. He also was one of the initial members of the Red Devils crew, and performed air shows. He became a line pilot of Air France. After World War II, he emigrated and continued to fly all over the world as a line pilot for many years.

=== Dumitru Ploeșteanu ===
He was an aircraft engines mechanic at the ARPA Flight School, but he also had a pilot licence.

=== Anton Stengher ===
He was an aircraft engines mechanic at the Cotroceni Flight Officers Training School, but he also had a pilot licence.

== See also ==
- History of aviation
