= Pan Am Flight 799 =

1968 airplane crash

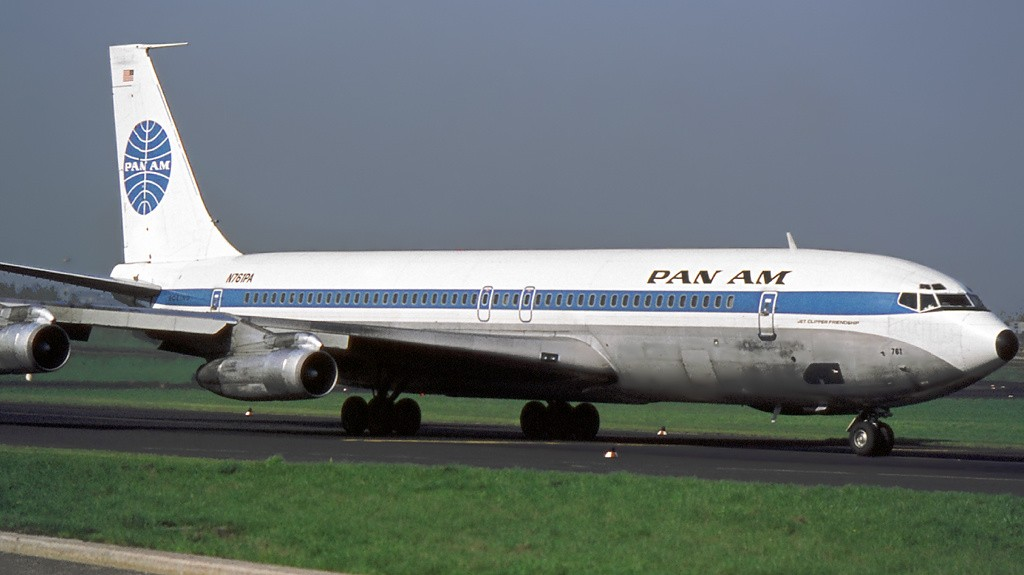
- A Pan Am Boeing 707 similar to the aircraft involved

Accident
- Date: December 26, 1968
- Summary: Crashed shortly after takeoff
- Site: Elmendorf AFB, Alaska, United States; 61°16′N 149°50′W

Aircraft
- Aircraft type: Boeing 707-321C
- Aircraft name: Clipper Racer
- Operator: Pan American World Airways
- IATA flight No.: PA799
- ICAO flight No.: PAA799
- Call sign: CLIPPER 799
- Registration: N799PA
- Flight origin: Los Angeles International Airport, Los Angeles, California, United States
- 1st stopover: Anchorage International Airport, Anchorage, Alaska, United States
- Last stopover: Da Nang Air Base, Da Nang, South Vietnam
- Destination: Cam Ranh Airport, Khánh Hòa province, South Vietnam
- Occupants: 3
- Passengers: 0
- Crew: 3
- Fatalities: 3
- Survivors: 0

Pan Am Flight 799 was an international cargo flight from Los Angeles International Airport to Cam Ranh Airport in South Vietnam that crashed on December 26, 1968, near Anchorage, Alaska. The aircraft involved was a Boeing 707 aircraft operated by Pan American World Airways. All three crew members died in the crash.

== Aircraft and crew ==
The Boeing 707-321C with construction number (c/n) 18824 and manufacturer serial number (msn) 397 was rolled out of Boeing's Renton, Washington factory on December 17, 1964, and two weeks later was sold to Pan American World Airways, where it received the name Clipper Racer. The four turbofan engines installed under the wing were Pratt & Whitney JT3D-3B models, with a thrust of 18,000 pounds each.

The captain was 47-year-old Arthur Moen, who had 15,207 hours of total pilot time including 3,969 hours in a Boeing 707, and had been with the airline since 1949. The first officer was 38-year-old Johannes D. Markestein, who had 9,813 hours of total pilot time, including 2,813 hours in a Boeing 707, and had been with the airline since 1957. The flight engineer was 31-year-old James R. Skellenger, who had 3,032 hours of total pilot time, including 138 hours of flight engineer time in Boeing 707s.

These three crew members had not flown together before, although the captain and co-pilot had previously flown together from Anchorage, twice.

== Accident ==
The aircraft carried out a regular postal shipment from San Francisco, California to Cam Ranh Bay, South Vietnam with intermediate stops in Anchorage, Alaska; Tokyo, Japan; and Da Nang, South Vietnam. An interim landing in Anchorage, Alaska was done for refueling and crew change. At 10:54 p.m., (Note: All times are expressed in Alaska Time Zone.) Flight 799 took off from San Francisco to Anchorage, and the flight initially took place without any problems. However, since Anchorage Airport was closed due to weather conditions, Captain Moen had to land at nearby Elmendorf Air Force Base, as planned ahead of time. The crew noted that there were problems with the No. 4 engine's thrust-reverser.

Flight 799 was delayed in leaving Elmendorf for two hours. Eventually, at 5:55 a.m., Captain Moen started the engines, and, at 6:02 a.m., the craft was allowed to taxi to the runway: Air Traffic Control gave permission to proceed to Runway 5, but the crew requested Runway 23, as the latter had greater effective length. When the crew were offered a "follow me" truck due to lack of knowledge of the facility, they were pre-occupied with the taxi checklist. Captain Moen had not re-lowered the flaps after raising them to prevent icing, during which time First Officer Markestein remarked "Okay, let's not forget them." As Flight 799 reached the runway's end thanks to the "follow me" truck guiding them there, two Air Force flights took off before them, and then Flight 799 was cleared for takeoff at 6:15 a.m.

Take-off would be performed by First Officer Markestein, and he proceeded to power up all four engines. Immediately after the plane left the ground, the cockpit stick shaker began to vibrate, a safety feature to alert pilots of imminent aerodynamic stall. The aircraft then banked to the right, the right wing touched the ground, and the plane crashed 59.2 seconds after takeoff just beyond Runway 23, exploding from ground impact and being consumed by explosion and fire. All three crew members were killed upon impact.

== Investigation ==
The National Transportation Safety Board (NTSB) came to the conclusion that probable causes of the crash were (a) a defective checklist, (b) the 707's defective takeoff warning hardware, (c) ineffective implementation of Boeing's Service Bulletins, and (d) stress caused by a rushed flight schedule. The immediate mechanical cause was takeoff with flaps retracted, leading to loss of attitudinal control and altitude. NTSB discovered that a lower-flaps item appeared only on the taxi checklist, and was not included in the pre-takeoff checklist (which comes after the taxi checklist) so that it could remind the pilots that flaps must be lowered to ensure safe takeoff. The Cockpit Voice Recorder (CVR) showed that First Officer Markestein lowered flaps during initial reading of the taxi checklist, but Captain Moen then retracted flaps, initially without Markestein's knowledge, in accordance with Pan Am's cold weather operating procedures to prevent icing. Markestein was made aware of Moen's flaps retraction only during the taxi checklist's second reading, but neither officer remembered to revisit flaps, that item being absent from the pre-takeoff checklist. Any time a 707's flaps aren't extended (lowered) for takeoff, upon the crew applying thrust, the takeoff warning system should sound an audible warning signal (horn), but this didn't happen on flight 799, because Pan American had failed to implement Boeing's January 31, 1967 Service Bulletin 2384 recommending the warning system's throttle actuation point be reduced from 42 degrees of thrust-lever advancement to 25 degrees in order to work correctly in cold-weather conditions (where very cold air provides greater lift, as was the case with flight 799, hence less need for thrust): Pan Am's operations engineering group had decided (incorrectly) that Boeing's service bulletin was inapplicable to Pan Am aircraft, for reasons they never documented.

The NTSB recommended that checklists be revised so that items critical for safe flight be accomplished prior to takeoff, and that Boeing Service Bulletin No. 2384 be immediately made mandatory via an FAA airworthiness directive. FAA (belatedly) issued the requested airworthiness directive five months later, on May 28, 1969.

== Consequences ==
Flight 799 was one of a series of aircraft losses resulting proximately from failures in checklist design and implementation. Unfortunately, it took 18 years for NTSB's recommendation in the 1969 crash report that "Air carrier cockpit checklists to be reviewed in an effort to ensure that each list provides a means of reminding the crew, immediately prior to takeoff, that all items critical for safe flight have been accomplished" to be implemented. After the August 16, 1987, loss of Northwest Airlines Flight 255 for similar reasons, NTSB recommended that Federal Aviation Administration (FAA) convene a human-performance research group to determine "...if there is any type or method of presenting a checklist [that] produces better performance on part of user personnel," and for the FAA to recommend checklist typography criteria for commercial operators. In due course, these recommendations led to a sea change in checklist design and implementation, incorporating human-factors research and crew resource management into cockpit management.

== See also ==
- Santa Bárbara Airlines Flight 518- Similar crash caused by stress of rushed flight schedule.
- Delta Air Lines Flight 1141
- LAPA Flight 3142
- Mandala Airlines Flight 091
- Lufthansa Flight 540
- Spanair Flight 5022
- Northwest Airlines Flight 255
- British European Airways Flight 548
