= JKK =

JKK may refer to:

- Jan Krzysztof Kelus (born 1942), Polish poet and singer
- Jawahar Kala Kendra, an arts centre in Jaipur, India
- Spanair, a defunct Spanish airline
