= Lufthansa Flight 540 =

1974 aviation accident in Kenya

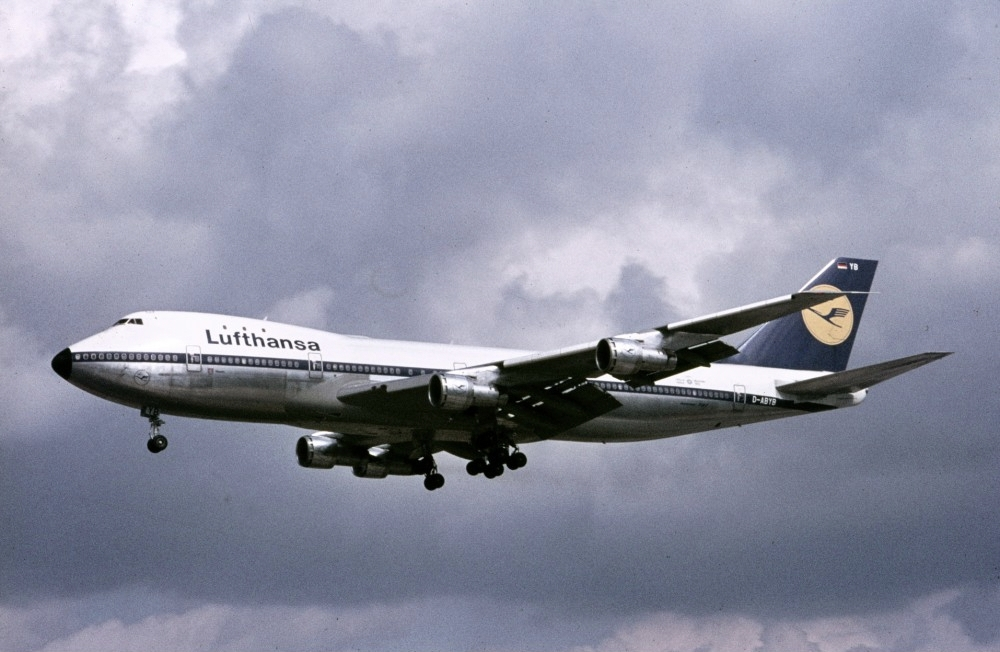
- D-ABYB, the aircraft involved in the accident, seen in August 1974

Accident
- Date: 20 November 1974
- Summary: Crashed shortly after takeoff due to pilot error and design flaw
- Site: Embakasi Airport, Nairobi, Kenya; 1.333735°S 36.908054°E

Aircraft
- Aircraft type: Boeing 747-130
- Aircraft name: Hessen
- Operator: Lufthansa
- IATA flight No.: LH540
- ICAO flight No.: DLH540
- Call sign: LUFTHANSA 540
- Registration: D-ABYB
- Flight origin: Frankfurt Airport, Frankfurt, West Germany
- Stopover: Embakasi Airport, Nairobi, Kenya
- Destination: Jan Smuts International Airport, Johannesburg, South Africa
- Occupants: 157
- Passengers: 139
- Crew: 18
- Fatalities: 59
- Injuries: 55
- Survivors: 98

Lufthansa Flight 540 was a scheduled commercial flight for Lufthansa, serving the Frankfurt–Nairobi–Johannesburg route. On 20 November 1974, the Boeing 747-130 that was operating as Flight 540 was carrying 157 people (139 passengers and 18 crew members) crashed and caught fire shortly after taking off from Embakasi Airport in Nairobi, Kenya, for the last leg of the flight, resulting in the deaths of 54 passengers and 5 crew members. The crash was the first fatal accident involving a Boeing 747, and it remains the deadliest crash in the history of Lufthansa. It also remains the deadliest aviation accident to occur in Kenya.

== Aircraft and crew ==
The aircraft involved was a Boeing 747-130 registered as D-ABYB and was named Hessen. It was the second 747 to be delivered to Lufthansa. It first flew on 30 March 1970 and was delivered to Lufthansa on 13 April. The aircraft was powered by four Pratt & Whitney JT9D-7 turbofan engines. The aircraft had 16,781 flying hours at the time of the accident.

In command was 53-year-old Captain Christian Krack (who had logged 10,464 flight hours, with 1,619 hours on the Boeing 747), 35-year-old First Officer Hans-Joachim Schacke (3,418 flight hours, 2,237 of which were logged on the Boeing 747) and 51-year-old Flight Engineer Rudolf "Rudi" Hahn (13,000 hours of flying experience). The cabin crew consisted of 14 regular flight attendants and 1 assistant stewardess, who was responsible for childcare. Lufthansa only offered the so-called Mickey Mouse Service on the route from Frankfurt to Johannesburg via a stopover in Kenya.

== Accident ==
The aircraft departed from runway 24 at the Embakasi Airport in Nairobi. Almost immediately, the pilots felt a buffeting vibration. Unbeknownst to them, the leading-edge slats were left in the retracted position. The captain continued the climb and retracted the landing gear. However, as this was being done, the aircraft started to descend and the stall warning system light came on. The aircraft continued to descend and approximately 3,700 feet (1,100 m) from the end of the runway, the plane crashed into grass. It then struck an elevated access road and broke up. The left wing exploded and fire spread to the fuselage. 54 of the 139 passengers and 5 of the 18 crew members died. The cockpit remained largely intact, and thus the three pilots survived the accident.

== Cause ==
The cause of the accident was determined to be a stall caused by the leading-edge slats — outboard variable camber leading-edge slats and inboard Krueger flaps — having been left in the retracted position. Even though the trailing edge flaps were deployed, without the slats being extended the aircraft's stall speed was higher and the maximum angle of attack was lower. As a result, the aircraft was unable to climb out of ground effect. The flight engineer was found to have failed to open the slat system bleed air valves as required on the pre-flight checklist. This prevented bleed air from flowing to the 747's pneumatic slat system and, since the leading edge slats on the 747 are pneumatically driven, kept it from deploying the leading edge slats for takeoff. The takeoff warning system, which would have sounded an alarm if the flaps had not been set for takeoff, did not have a separate warning that the slats' pneumatic valve had not been opened by the flight engineer.

The faulty state of the slats should by design have been indicated by yellow warning lights: one for the pilot, and eight for the flight engineer. However, both crew members stated in court that these lights had been green. Three possible explanations have since been offered for this inconsistency: that the morning sun was blinding the cockpit crew and thus hampered color perception, that a construction error could have caused green lights despite the retracted slats, and that the crew lied. None of these possibilities could be conclusively proven. The flight crew was blamed for not performing a satisfactory pre-takeoff checklist, but the accident report also faulted the lack of adequate warning systems that could have alerted the crew to the problem. Two previous occurrences of this error had been reported, but in those cases the pilots had been able to recover the aircraft in time. After this third, deadly incident, Boeing added systems to warn pilots if the slat valve had not been opened prior to takeoff.

Captain Krack and flight engineer Hahn were dismissed from Lufthansa shortly after, but their dismissals were overturned by a labor court, as no investigation report was available to rule out the possibility of a technical defect.

Flight engineer Hahn was charged with criminal negligence, but was acquitted in 1981. The accident was the first fatal crash involving a Boeing 747.

However, there are reliable indications that Lufthansa was already aware of possible problems with (false) displays concerning the slats a good six months before the Nairobi crash. Other airlines such as British Airways therefore equipped their aircraft with an additional warning system, which Lufthansa did not.

== See also ==
- Spanair Flight 5022
- Delta Air Lines Flight 1141
- LAPA Flight 3142
- Air India Flight 171

== Sources ==
- Moorhouse, Earl (1982). Wake Up, It's a Crash! The story of the first ever 747-Jet disaster. A survivor's account. London: Corgi. ISBN 0-552-11932-6.
- "Report on Accident to Boeing 747 Registered D-ABYB which occurred on 20th November 1974 at Nairobi Airport, Kenya." East African Community Accident Investigation Branch (Nairobi), 1976. Worldcat entry.
- Commander, Heino Caesor
- Lufthansa Flug 540: Der erste Jumbo-Absturz, Patrick Huber
