= Girjet =

Spanish charter airline

IATA	ICAO	Call sign
8G	GJT	BANJET
- Founded: 2003
- Ceased operations: 2008
- Hubs: Josep Tarradellas Barcelona–El Prat Airport
- Fleet size: 4
- Headquarters: Barcelona, Catalonia, Spain
- Website: http://www.girjet.com

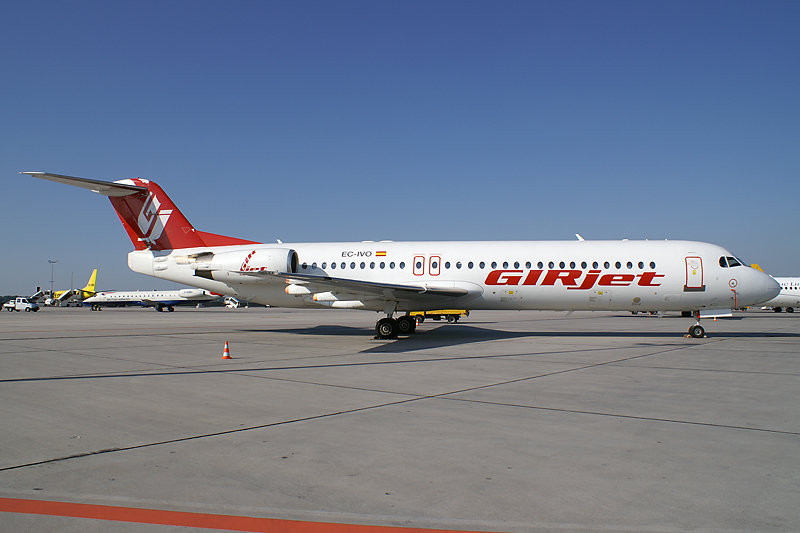
Girjet Fokker 100

Girjet (Gestión Aérea Ejecutiva, SL) was an airline based in Barcelona, Catalonia, Spain. It operated charter services. Its base was Josep Tarradellas Barcelona–El Prat Airport.

== History ==
The airline was created on 28 February 2003 and started operations on 31 July 2003. It flew under its own name and for other operators such as Spanair. It also made cargo flights with a Boeing 747-200.

By April 2008, Girjet had lost its Air operator's certificate and the whole fleet was grounded. Since then some aircraft made their way to other airlines, either sold or returned to their lessors.

== Fleet ==
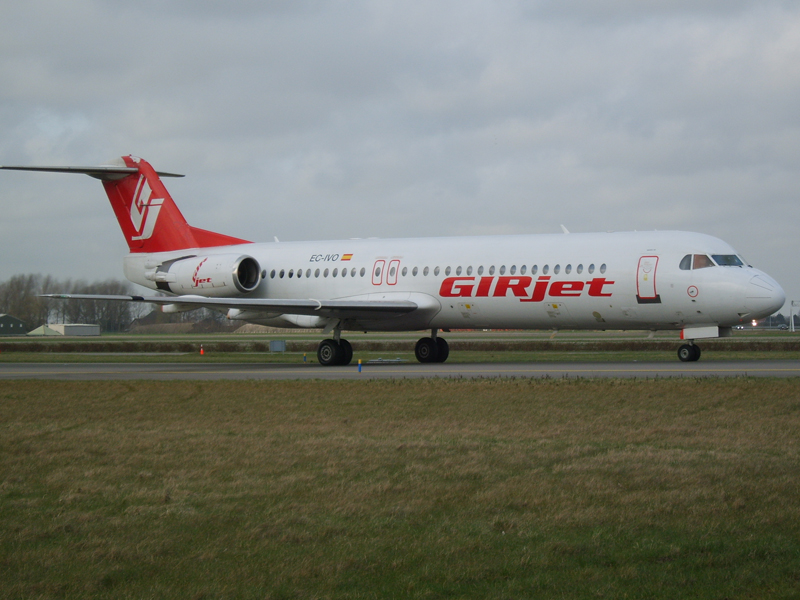
Girjet Fokker 100 at Amsterdam Schiphol

The Girjet fleet consisted of the following aircraft (at December 2007):

- 4 Fokker 100
- 1 Boeing 757-200
- 1 Boeing 747-200F GIRjet Cargo

== Incidents ==
- The Boeing 757-200 chartered by a French Non-Governmental Organization called Zoé's Ark was impounded in Chad in October 2007 and the crew arrested due to accusations of human trafficking of minors for flying children out of the country with no national authorities authorization. Finally, the crew was found not guilty and released on 9 November 2007 by the Justice Court of N'Djamena
- Around 13 December 2007 EC-JOM, a Fokker 100 was impounded at Manchester Airport for an unknown reason.
