= Niezależna Oficyna Wydawnicza CDN =

The Independent Printing House CDN (better known as CDN, Polish: Niezależna Oficyna Wydawnicza CDN) was an underground printing house (bibuła) operating in Poland between 1982 and 1990.

Formed after the imposition of the Martial Law in Poland, it focused on publishing various mostly history-related books. Apart from the modern history of Poland and Central Europe, the topics included also other topics banned by the Communist censorship, including sociology and politology. The CDN also published a number of magazines and music tapes, among them a series of cassettes featuring the songs of Jan Krzysztof Kelus. About 30 cassettes were released under the Phonographic Offices, including songs by Jan Krzysztof Kelus and Jacek Kaczmarski, performances by Jacek Fedorowicz.

== See also ==
- List of record labels
