= Sole Survivor (2013 film) =

- Directed by: Ky Dickens
- Written by: Ky Dickens
- Produced by: Susan Aurinko; Ky Dickens; Alexis Jaworski; Amy McIntyre
- Cinematography: Tom Clayton
- Edited by: Anna Patel
- Music by: Franck Rapp
- Release date: November 13, 2013
- Running time: 91 minutes
- Country: United States
- Language: English
- Budget: $380,000

Sole Survivor is a 2013 CNN Films documentary film by director Ky Dickens. The film features interviews with survivors about their experiences.

== Cast of survivors ==
- Bahia Bakari, Yemenia Flight 626
- Cecelia Cichan, Northwest Airlines Flight 255
- George Lamson Jr., Galaxy Airlines Flight 203
- James Polehinke, Comair Flight 5191

== See also ==
- List of aviation accidents and incidents with a sole survivor
