= Spanair =

Airline of Spain (1986–2012)

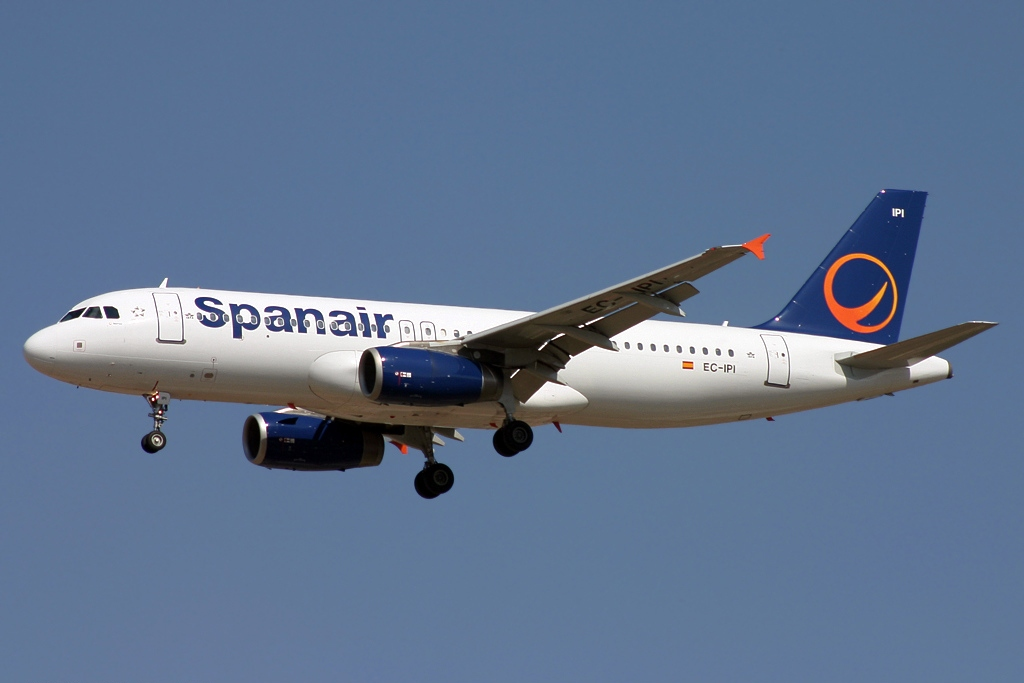
- Spanair Airbus A320 in 2009
IATA	ICAO	Call sign
JK	JKK	SPANAIR
- Founded: December 1986
- Commenced operations: March 1988
- Ceased operations: 27 January 2012
- Hubs: Barcelona
- Focus cities: Madrid; Palma de Mallorca; Tenerife–North
- Frequent-flyer program: Spanair Star
- Alliance: Star Alliance (2003–2012)
- Fleet size: 28
- Destinations: 40
- Parent company: SAS Group (1986–2009); Consortium of Investors (led by Consorci de Turisme de Barcelona and Catalana d'Iniciatives) (80.1%); iberiojet (19.9%)
- Headquarters: L'Hospitalet de Llobregat, Barcelona, Spain
- Key people: Mike Szücs (CEO)

Spanair S.A. was a Spanish airline, with its head office in the Spanair Building in L'Hospitalet de Llobregat, near Barcelona. Until 2009, it was a subsidiary of the SAS Group; the same parent company in control of Scandinavian Airlines and held slightly under 20% of the company. Spanair provided a scheduled passenger network within Spain and Europe, with an extension to West Africa. Worldwide charters were also flown for tour companies. Its main hub was Josep Tarradellas Barcelona–El Prat Airport, with focus cities at Adolfo Suárez Madrid–Barajas Airport and Palma de Mallorca Airport. The airline had 3,161 employees and was a Star Alliance member from 2003 until its demise on 27 January 2012.

== History ==
First Spanair logo (1986–1999)

Second Spanair logo (1999–2009)

=== Foundation and early years ===
The airline was established in December 1986 and began operations in March 1988. It was set up as a joint venture between Scandinavian Airlines and Viajes Marsans, and began operations with European charters. Long-haul flights to the United States, Mexico and the Dominican Republic were launched in 1991, followed by domestic scheduled flights in March 1994. The airline flew long-haul flights with Boeing 767-300ER aircraft to Washington and Buenos Aires in the late 1990s.

Spanair joined the Star Alliance on 1 May 2003.

SAS announced in a press release 13 June 2007 that it would sell its shares in Spanair. The divestment was cancelled on 19 June 2008 due to SAS not being able to sell for a price that it considered to "reflect the underlying value in Spanair." On 30 January 2009, however, a one-euro bid from a group of investors from Catalonia, led by the Consorci de Turisme de Barcelona and Catalana d'Initiatives, was later accepted, whereupon SAS became a minority shareholder.

A report in the British newspaper The Times on the day of the 2008 Madrid crash suggests that staff were threatening strike action due to concerns about the company's viability.

In 2009 the airline asked for public input on a new logo, with a winner being officially confirmed on 13 May 2009. As of June 2009, Spanair began applying the new corporate identity to their aircraft.

=== Demise ===
On 25 January 2011, the company was in an "Emergency Financial Situation". The Catalan government approved a €10.5 million loan plan in order to save it. Revenue improved and the company began cutting costs. Financially troubled during its last few years, Spanair ended operations on 27 January 2012, after Qatar Airways pulled out of talks to inject cash into the airline. As a result, SAS had a write-down of 1.7 billion Swedish kronor ($251 million U.S.). Ana Pastor, the development minister of Spain, said that the Spanish government may fine the airline 9 million euros (US$12 million) after breaking serious aviation security rules by shutting down without proper notice. The carrier said all flights would remain suspended, but it did not say whether it planned to file for bankruptcy. The last passenger flight was JK1326 from Trondheim to Las Palmas.

== Corporate affairs ==
=== Head office ===
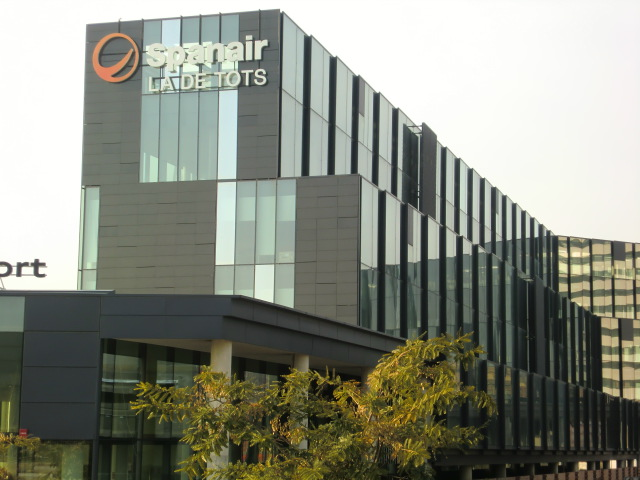
Spanair head office in l'Hospitalet de Llobregat, near Barcelona

Spanair's head office was located in the Spanair Building (Edifici Spanair) in L'Hospitalet de Llobregat, near Barcelona.

Previously Spanair's head office was in the Spanair Building on the grounds of Palma de Mallorca Airport in Palma de Mallorca. In 2008, during the changes in ownership, Spanair said that its head office would remain in Palma de Mallorca, despite rumors that the company would relocate its head office to Barcelona. In 2009 the company announced that it planned to relocate its corporate offices to Barcelona. In May 2009 Spanair made Barcelona its registered domicile. The airline began to search for a site for the Spanair headquarters in Barcelona. In June of that year around 200 employees protested outside of the Spanair offices in Palma, saying that the timetable to move the offices was too hasty.

=== Service concept ===
For economy-class passengers traveling within Western Europe the airline offered a buy on board service offering food and drinks for purchase. Spanair also had revamped their own frequent flyer programme, which was renamed Spanair Star. It was innovative for allowing members to redeem points immediately, in the form of a discount on a future flight.

=== Sponsorship ===
Between 1995 and 2005, Spanair was the main kit sponsor of Spanish football club RCD Mallorca.

== Destinations ==
Routes operated by Spanair:

From:	To:
Barcelona	Operated in 2012: A Coruña, Algiers, Alicante, Asturias, Bamako, Banjul, Belgrade, Bilbao, Copenhagen, Gran Canaria, Granada, Helsinki, Ibiza, Istanbul-Sabiha Gökçen, Madrid, Málaga, Menorca, Munich, Marseille, Nador, Naples, Palma de Mallorca, Santiago de Compostela, Seville, Stockholm-Arlanda, Tel Aviv, Tenerife-North, Tenerife-South, Valencia, Venice-Marco Polo, Vigo. Cancelled before 2012: Almeria,Bari, Berlin-Tegel, Dubrovnik, Edinburgh, Frankfurt, Hamburg, Jerez de la Frontera, Malta, Naples, Nice, Tripoli, Zagreb., Zurich.
Madrid	Operated in 2012: A Coruña, Alicante, Barcelona, Bilbao, Copenhagen, Frankfurt, Fuerteventura, Gran Canaria, Ibiza, Lanzarote, Málaga, Menorca, Palma de Mallorca, Santiago de Compostela, Tenerife-North, Tenerife-South, Valencia. Cancelled before 2012: Algiers,Belgrade, Casablanca, Dubrovnik, Malabo, Pamplona Santander, Stockholm-Arlanda, Zurich, Vigo.
Alicante	Operated in 2012: Algiers, Barcelona, Madrid, Oran. Cancelled before 2012: Copenhagen, Palma de Mallorca, Stockholm Arlanda.
Lanzarote	Operated in 2012: Bilbao, Madrid. Cancelled before 2012: Barcelona.
Bilbao	Operated in 2012: Barcelona, Lanzarote, Gran Canaria, Madrid, Tenerife-South. Cancelled before 2012: Jerez de la Frontera, Malaga, Munich, Valencia.
Málaga	Operated in 2012: Barcelona, Copenhagen, Madrid, Tenerife-South. Cancelled before 2012: Fuerteventura, Lyon, Palma de Mallorca, Strasbourg, Venice Marco Polo.
Palma de Mallorca	Operated in 2012: Barcelona, Madrid, Nador. Cancelled before 2012: Copenhagen, Stockholm Arlanda.
Santiago de Compostela	Operated in 2012: Barcelona, Madrid, Tenerife-South.
Valencia	Operated in 2012: Barcelona, Madrid, Tenerife-South. Cancelled before 2012: Algiers.

=== Codeshare agreements ===
Spanair had codeshare agreements with the following airlines until January 2012, Airlines marked with * were members of Star Alliance at the time of Spanair's collapse.

- Aer Lingus
- Aegean Airlines *
- Air Canada *
- Air China *
- airBaltic
- Air Europa (SkyTeam)
- All Nippon Airways *
- Asiana Airlines *
- Austrian Airlines *
- Blue1 *
- British Midland International *
- Brussels Airlines *
- Croatia Airlines *
- Continental Airlines *
- EgyptAir *
- Estonian Air
- LOT Polish Airlines *
- Lufthansa *
- Scandinavian Airlines (ends in 2011)*
- Singapore Airlines *
- Swiss International Air Lines *
- TAM Airlines*
- TAP Air Portugal *
- Thai Airways International *
- Turkish Airlines *
- United Airlines *
- US Airways *

== Fleet ==
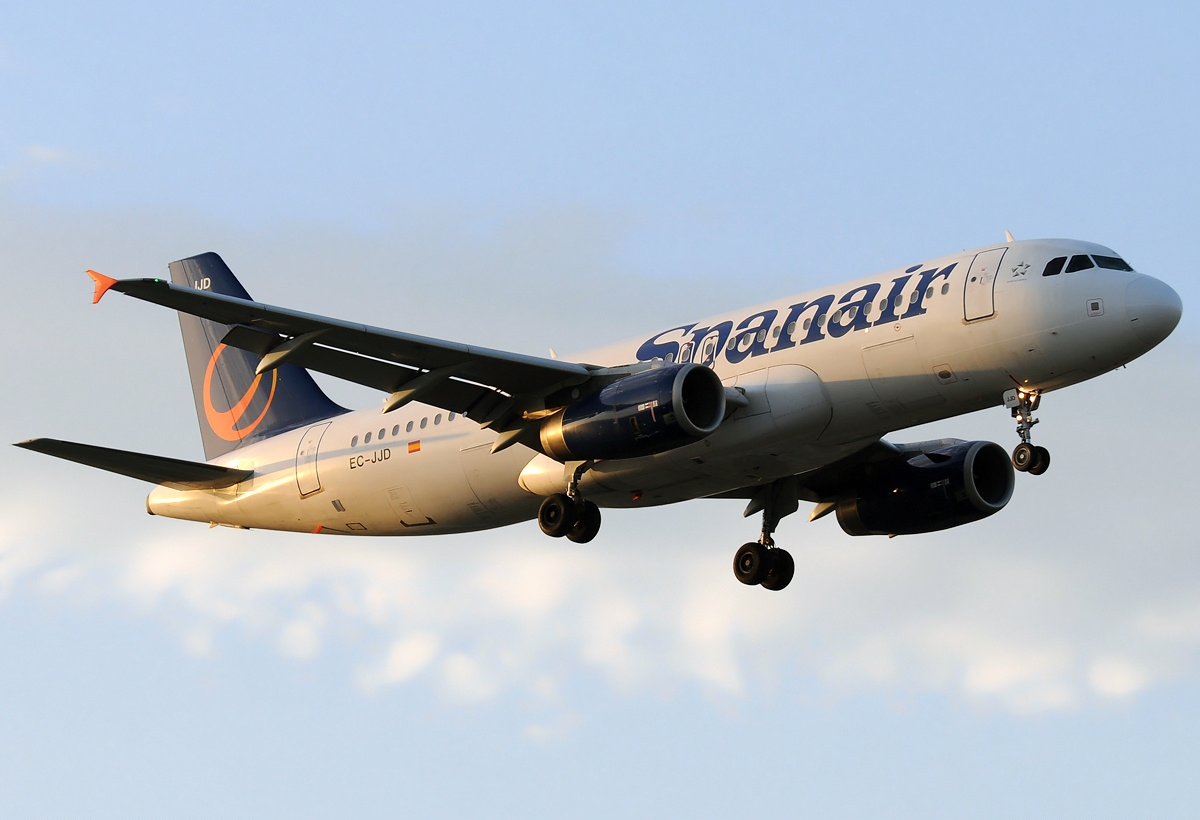
Spanair Airbus A320-200 in a hybrid livery with old titles and new tailfin design

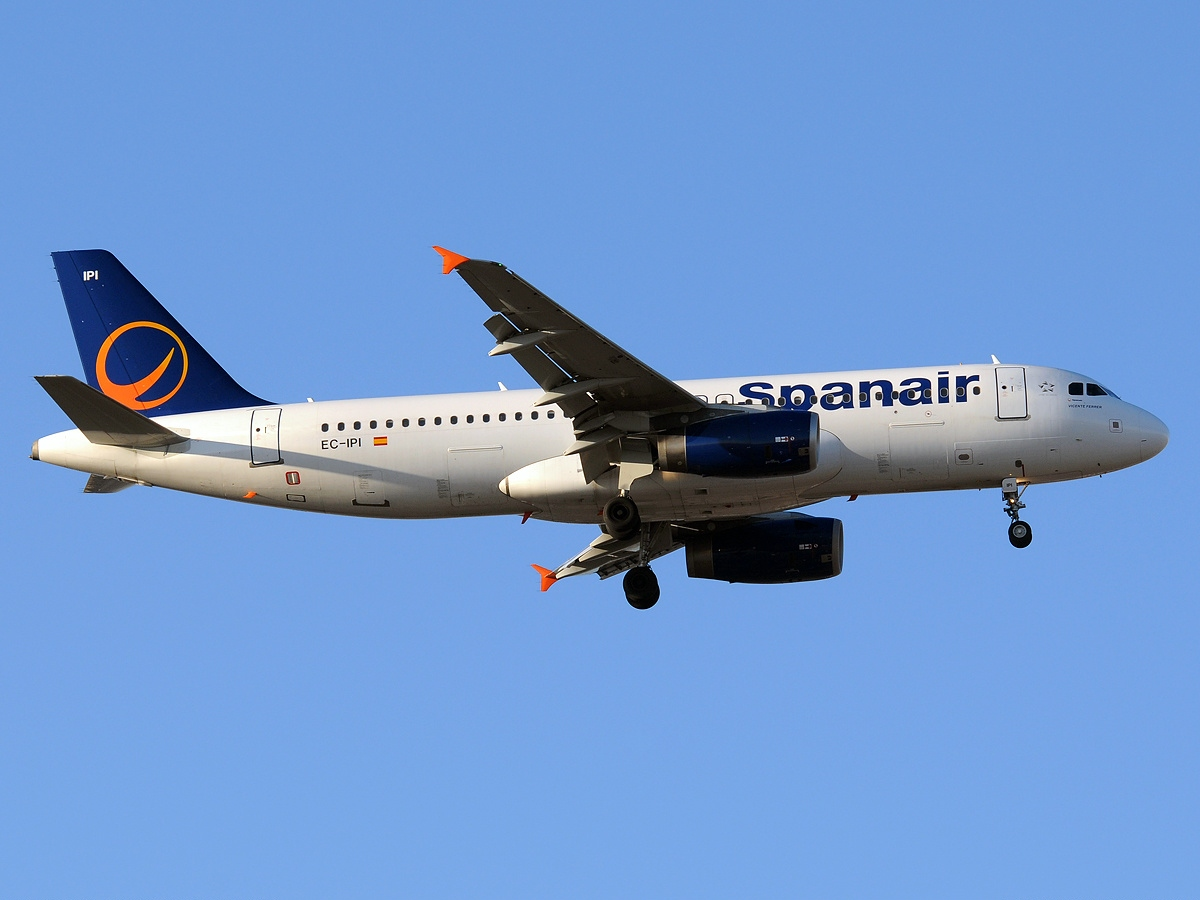
Spanair Airbus A320-200 in the final full livery that was only applied to a few aircraft

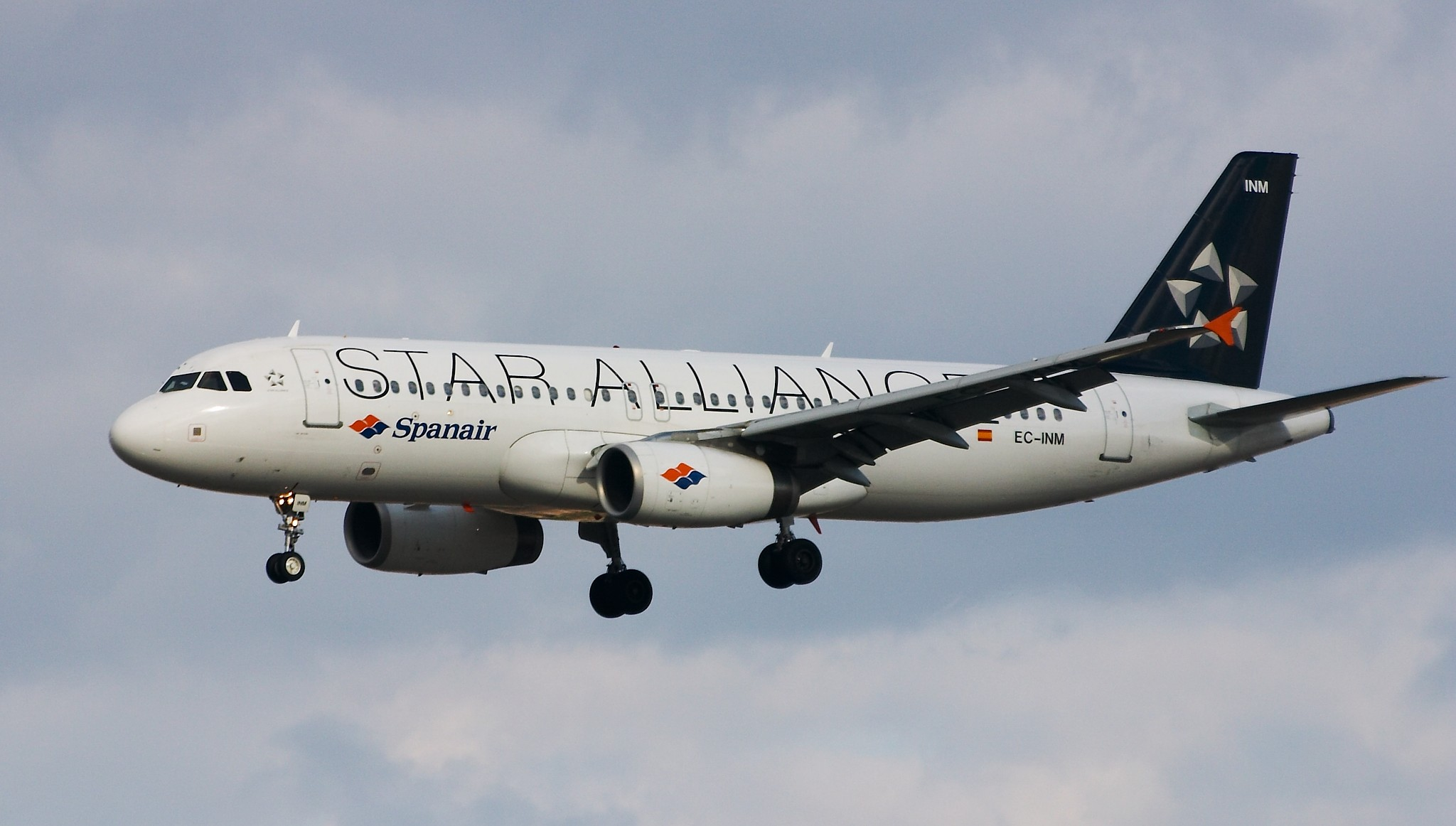
Spanair Airbus A320-200 in Star Alliance livery

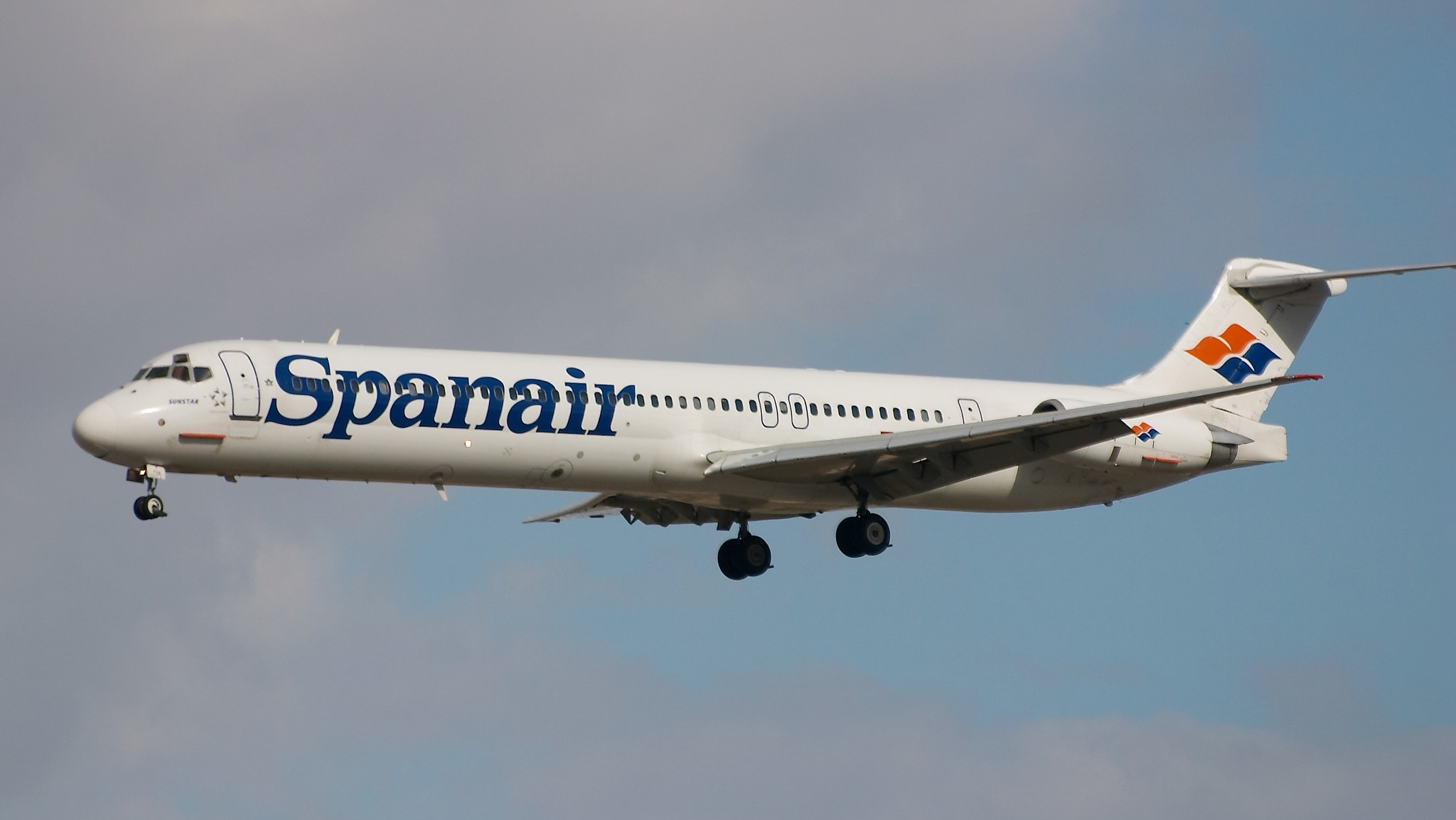
Spanair McDonnell Douglas MD-83 in the former livery (2005)

=== Final fleet ===
The Spanair fleet consisted of the following aircraft at the time of closure.

Spanair fleet
Aircraft	In service	Passengers			Notes
Aircraft	In service	C	Y	Total	Notes
Airbus A320-200	19	48	108	156	Flexible two-class layout
Airbus A320-200	19	—	180	180	Flexible two-class layout
Airbus A321-200	5	—	212	212	
McDonnell Douglas MD-83	2	—	153	153	Leased from Scandinavian Airlines They would be replaced by A320-200
McDonnell Douglas MD-87	2	—	125	125	Flexible two-class layout They would be replaced by A320-200
Total	28				

=== Retired fleet ===
Spanair operated the following aircraft before its closure:

Spanair former fleet
Aircraft	Total	Introduced	Retired	Notes
Boeing 717-200	4	2007	2011	Transferred to Blue1
Boeing 757-200	2	1996	1998	Leased from Airtours International Airways
Boeing 757-200	4	1999	2000	Leased from Air2000, Air Holland, and Monarch Airlines
Boeing 767-300ER	3	1991	2002	One leased from Lauda Air
Fokker 100	3	2005	2008	Leased from Girjet
McDonnell Douglas DC-9-51	1	1989	1989	
McDonnell Douglas MD-81	3	2005	2006	Leased from Scandinavian Airlines
McDonnell Douglas MD-82	15	1990	2009	Flexible two-class layout
McDonnell Douglas MD-82	1	1990	2008	crashed as Spanair Flight 5022
McDonnell Douglas MD-83	25	1993	2011	
McDonnell Douglas MD-83	1	1991	1991	Private Jet expedition use
McDonnell Douglas MD-87	18	1996	2011	

== Accidents and incidents ==
- On 10 May 2001, Spanair Flight 3203 (McDonnell Douglas MD-83 EC-FXI named "Sunseeker") was substantially damaged when the starboard undercarriage collapsed while landing at Liverpool John Lennon Airport. All 45 passengers and 5 crew members on board safely evacuated from the aircraft by using the escape slides. The substantially-damaged aircraft was repaired and returned to service.
- On 20 August 2008 at 14:45 CEST, Spanair Flight 5022 (McDonnell Douglas MD-82 EC-HFP named "Sunbreeze"), crashed with 166 passengers and six crew members on board moments after takeoff at Madrid's Barajas Airport on a scheduled flight to Las Palmas de Gran Canaria. Initially 19 of the 172 people aboard the aircraft survived, but one person died in a hospital three days after the crash. The initial investigation reports no deployment of flaps, with failures in the take-off warning system.

== See also ==
- AeBal-Spanair Link
- List of airlines of Spain
- List of airports in Spain
- List of companies of Spain
- Transport in Spain
