= Jan Krzysztof Kelus =

Polish singer

Jan Krzysztof Kelus, also known by his initials JKK, (born 1942) is a Polish singer, poet, composer, and a member of the democratic opposition in Poland between the 1960s and 1980s. A professional sociologist, Kelus is best known for a number of ballads which gained him a nickname of the Bard of the opposition and Polish Woody Guthrie.

After a brief period at the faculty of law, Kelus graduated from the faculty of sociology of the Warsaw University. After the events of March 1968 he became involved in various groups of the democratic opposition to the Communist regime of the People's Republic of Poland. Arrested in 1969 for his involvement in smuggling books published in Paris by Jerzy Giedroyc's Kultura through the Tatra Mountains, he was sentenced to imprisonment in the so-called Tatra Climbers' Trial. Released from the prison after the advent of Edward Gierek's rule, Kelus was involved in the Workers' Defence Committee (KOR) where he organized legal and financial aid to workers and labor activists persecuted by the communist authorities. About that time his songs, passed in bootleg copies outside of the official market and without acceptance of the censorship, became one of the symbols of the opposition. During that time he also translated several songs by Czech artist Karel Kryl.

Simultaneously to his anti-communist activities, in the 1970s Kelus was working at the Gynaecological Institute of the Medical University of Warsaw. Dismissed from the job due to his political activity in 1979, Kelus continued his involvement in the opposition. In early 1980s he was among the founders of the Niezależna Oficyna Wydawnicza CDN, the largest underground printing house of that time. Arrested in 1981 after the imposition of the Martial Law in Poland, Kelus was interned in Białołęka, along with other notable leaders of the Solidarity. During that time JKK's songs were performed by numerous artists, among them Jacek Kaczmarski and Antonina Krzysztoń. After the peaceful transition of power in Poland in 1989, Kelus withdrew from public life to a house near Białowieża, where he owns a small beekeeping farm. Most of his songs were officially issued after 1989 for the first time.
