= Take-off warning system =

Set of warning signals

A take-off warning system (TOWS) is a set of warning signals required on most commercial aircraft, designed to alert the pilots of potentially-dangerous errors in an aircraft's take-off configuration.

== Overview ==
There are numerous systems on board an aircraft that must be set in the proper configuration to allow it to take off safely. Prior to every flight, the flight officers use checklists to verify that each of the many systems is operating and has been configured correctly. Due to the inevitability of human error, even the checklist procedure can lead to failures to properly configure the aircraft.

Several improper configurations can leave an aircraft completely unable to become airborne—these conditions can easily result in fatal hull loss accidents. In order to reduce this, all major nations now mandate something similar to the US requirement that on (nearly) "all airplanes with a maximum weight more than 6,000 pounds and all jets [...] a takeoff warning system must be installed". This system must meet the following requirements:

(a) The system must provide to the pilots an aural warning that is automatically activated during the initial portion of the takeoff roll if the airplane is in a configuration that would not allow a safe takeoff. The warning must continue until—

(1) The configuration is changed to allow safe takeoff, or

(2) Action is taken by the pilot to abandon the takeoff roll.

(b) The means used to activate the system must function properly for all authorized takeoff power settings and procedures and throughout the ranges of takeoff weights, altitudes, and temperatures for which certification is requested.

TOWS is designed to sound a warning for numerous other dangerous errors in the take-off configuration, such as the flaps and slats not being extended when the throttles are opened while the aircraft is on the ground. The alert is typically in the form of an audible warning horn accompanied by a voice message that indicates the nature of the configuration error.

== History ==
Early systems simply indicated if the landing gear were not down and locked in position. This was followed by the addition of a warning as to the position of the cowl flaps.

Takeoff warning systems were in use on Boeing 707s as early as 1968.

== See also ==
A number of aircraft disasters due to improper configuration have happened in spite of the presence of a functional take-off warning system:

- Delta Air Lines Flight 1141
- LAPA Flight 3142
- Lufthansa Flight 540
- Mandala Airlines Flight 91
- Northwest Airlines Flight 255
- Spanair Flight 5022
