= Northwest Airlines Flight 255 =

1987 aviation accident in Michigan

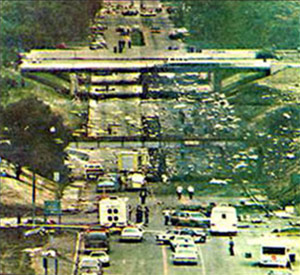
- Scattered aircraft debris at Middlebelt Road

Accident
- Date: August 16, 1987
- Summary: Pilot error; Loss of control on takeoff due to improper flaps and slats configuration
- Site: Detroit Metropolitan Wayne County Airport, Romulus, Michigan, U.S.; 42°14′N 83°20′W
- Total fatalities: 156
- Total injuries: 6

Aircraft
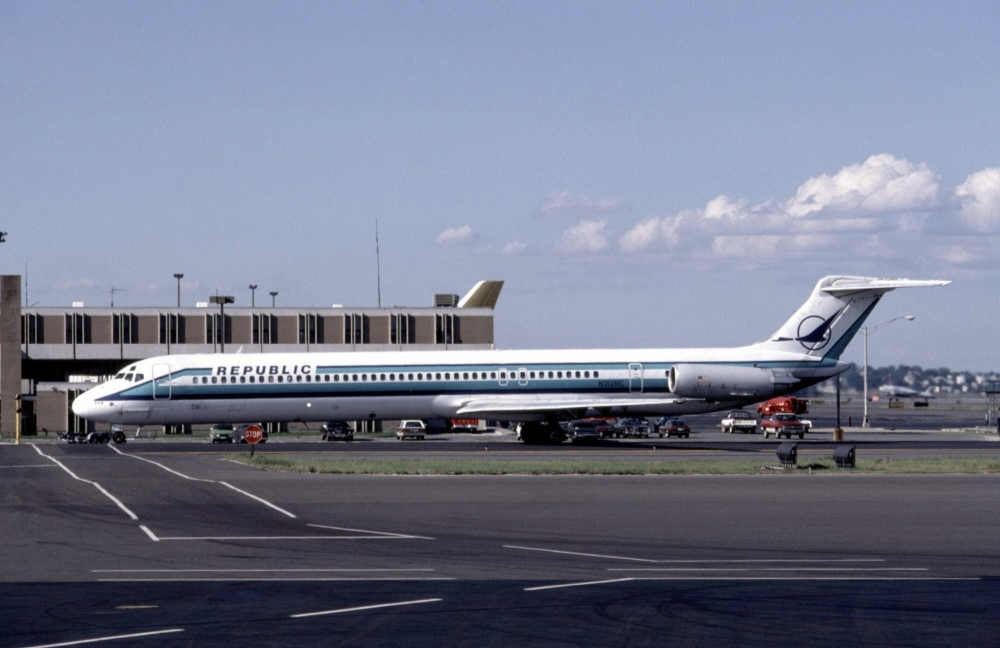
- N312RC, the aircraft involved in the accident, while still in service with Republic Airlines in 1986
- Aircraft type: McDonnell Douglas MD-82
- Operator: Northwest Airlines
- IATA flight No.: NW255
- ICAO flight No.: NWA255
- Call sign: NORTHWEST 255
- Registration: N312RC
- Flight origin: Minneapolis–Saint Paul International Airport, Fort Snelling, Minnesota, U.S. (as Flight 750)
- 1st stopover: MBS International Airport, Saginaw, Michigan, U.S.
- 2nd stopover: Detroit Metropolitan Wayne County Airport, Romulus, Michigan, U.S.
- Last stopover: Sky Harbor International Airport, Phoenix, Arizona, U.S.
- Destination: John Wayne Airport, Santa Ana, California, U.S.
- Occupants: 155
- Passengers: 149
- Crew: 6
- Fatalities: 154
- Injuries: 1
- Survivors: 1

Ground casualties
- Ground fatalities: 2
- Ground injuries: 5

On Sunday, August 16, 1987, a McDonnell Douglas MD-82 operating as Northwest Airlines Flight 255 crashed shortly after takeoff from Detroit Metropolitan Airport at about 20:46 EDT (00:46 UTC August 17). All six crew members and 148 of the 149 passengers, as well as two people on the ground, were killed.

The National Transportation Safety Board (NTSB) determined that the probable cause of the accident was the flight crew's failure to set flaps and slats for takeoff. A contributing factor was a lack of power to the aircraft's central aural warning system, which prevented the takeoff warning system from providing an aural alert to the crew of the improper takeoff configuration.

== Background ==
=== Aircraft ===
At the time of the accident, the aircraft was painted in an interim livery following the merger of Republic Airlines, similar to this one

The aircraft involved was a twin-engine McDonnell Douglas MD-82 (registration number N312RC), a derivative of the McDonnell Douglas DC-9 and part of the McDonnell Douglas MD-80 series of aircraft. The jet was manufactured in 1981, entered service with Republic Airlines, and was acquired by Northwest Airlines in its merger with Republic in 1986. The aircraft was powered by two Pratt & Whitney JT8D-217 turbofan engines.

=== Crew ===
Two pilots and four flight attendants crewed Flight 255. The captain was 57-year-old John R. Maus from Las Vegas, Nevada, and the first officer was 35-year-old David J. Dodds from Galena, Illinois. Maus had logged 20,859 flight hours in his career, with 1,359 on the McDonnell Douglas MD-80. He had continuously worked for the airline and its predecessors for 31 years, also flying the Fairchild F-27, Boeing 727, Boeing 757 and McDonnell Douglas DC-9. Other pilots who had flown with Maus described him as a "competent and capable pilot" who had a reputation for operating "by the book". Dodds had 8,044 flight hours, with 1,604 on the MD-82, and had continuously worked for the airline and its predecessors for more than eight years. Captains with whom Dodds had flown graded him as average or above average, describing him as competent, thorough and not hesitant to alert senior pilots of potential problems.

=== Schedule ===
The flight crew began their workday on Sunday, August 16, 1987, scheduled to operate the accident aircraft together for four flight segments. The first leg, operating as Northwest Flight 750, was from Minneapolis–Saint Paul International Airport to MBS International Airport in Saginaw, Michigan. From there, the same flight crew and aircraft continued as Flight 255, with scheduled stops at Detroit Metropolitan Wayne County Airport, Phoenix Sky Harbor International Airport and the final destination, John Wayne Airport in Santa Ana, California. Other than a minor problem taxiing to the arrival gate, the flight from Saginaw to Detroit was uneventful. During the stopover at Detroit, a Northwest Airlines mechanic inspected the aircraft and the logbook.

== Accident ==
At approximately 20:32 EDT, Flight 255 departed the gate in Detroit with 149 passengers, including 21 children, and six crew members. At pushback, the total weight of the airliner was 144,046 pounds (65,338 kg), just under the maximum allowable weight of 146,058 pounds (66,251 kg).

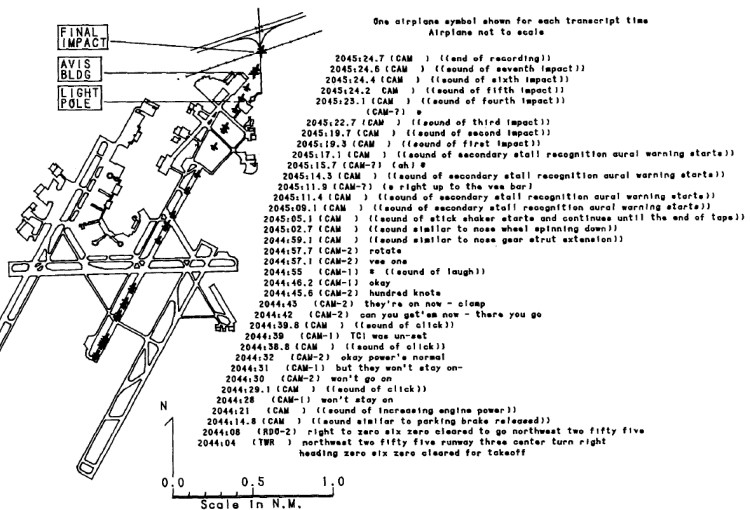
NTSB diagram of Flight 255's takeoff and crash

At 20:34:50, Flight 255 was cleared to taxi to Runway 3C (center). At 20:35:43, the ground controller instructed the pilots to use taxiway C and switch to frequency 119.45 MHz to communicate with another controller. Dodds acknowledged the instructions to follow the taxiways but did not repeat the new frequency and did not tune the radio to it. The dispatch packet provided by the airline included takeoff performance data based on using Runway 21L or 21R, but the flight was cleared for takeoff on Runway 3C, the shortest available runway. The flight crew reconfigured the on-board computer for takeoff on Runway 3C. Dodds also recalculated the plane's takeoff weight and concluded that it was within allowable limits. In the process of taxiing, Flight 255 missed the required turn, so Dodds contacted the ground controller and received instructions on how to proceed to Runway 3C and to switch to 119.45 MHz. Dodds again acknowledged the instructions and this time acknowledged the new frequency and switched to it. The second ground controller specified the route to Runway 3C. The crew also received a brief weather report.

At 20:42:11, Flight 255 was instructed to position and hold at the start of Runway 3C. The controller advised that a three-minute delay was required to allow for the dissipation of wake turbulence from the previous takeoff. At 20:44:04, Flight 255 was cleared for takeoff and began its takeoff roll at 20:44:21, with Maus at the controls.

The plane lifted off the runway at 170 kn (200 mph; 310 km/h) and began to roll from side to side just under 50 ft (15 m) above the ground. The MD-82's rate of climb was greatly reduced because the flaps were not extended, and at about 2,760 ft (840 m) past the end of Runway 3C, the left wing struck a light pole in a rental-car lot. The impact caused the left wing to ignite and begin disintegrating. The plane rolled 90° to the left, striking the roof of an Avis Car Rental building. The plane crashed inverted onto Middlebelt Road and struck vehicles just north of the intersection with Wick Road, killing two people in a car. It then broke apart, with the fuselage skidding across the road, disintegrating and bursting into flames as it hit a Norfolk Southern railroad overpass and the overpass of eastbound Interstate 94.

Partial transcript of Northwest Airlines Flight 255's cockpit voice recorder; full transcript in appendix B)
* = Unintelligible word; () = Questionable text; (()) = Commentary; — = Break in continuity; Shading = Radio communication
Time (EDT)	Source	Content
20:43:48	Detroit tower (to 594CC)	Citation five ninety-four Charlie Charlie, metro tower. Winds three zero zero at thirteen, runway three right, cleared to land. Where are you parking on the field?
20:43:55	594CC (to Detroit tower)	Three zero zero at one three, and we'll be going to page avjet.
20:43:59	Detroit tower (to Northwest Airlines Flight 766)	Northwest seven sixty-six, contact ground one two one point eight.
20:44:04	Detroit tower (to Northwest Airlines Flight 255)	Northwest two fifty-five runway three center, turn right heading zero six zero, cleared for takeoff.
20:44:08	First officer (to Detroit tower)	Right to zero six zero, cleared to go, northwest two fifty-five.
20:44:12	Detroit tower (to Northwest Airlines Flight 185)	Northwest one eighty-five metro tower three center taxi into position and hold you have about three minutes two to three minutes on the runway.
20:44:17	Northwest Airlines Flight 185 (to Detroit tower)	Okay, position and hold, northwest one eighty-five.
20:44:14.8	((Sound similar to parking brake released))	
20:44:21	((Sound of increasing engine power))	
20:44:28	Captain	Won't stay on. (Note: During the takeoff roll, the pilots noticed that the aircraft's autothrottle was not engaged, indicating that the aircraft's computer was not in takeoff mode.)
20:44:29.1	((Sound of click))	
20:44:30	First officer	Won't go on?
20:44:31	Captain	But they won't stay on—
20:44:32	First officer	Okay power's normal.
20:44:38	Detroit tower (to Northwest Airlines Flight 1466)	Northwest fourteen sixty-six, metro tower, traffic you're following is a very short final, runway three left, cleared to land. Winds three zero zero at one three.
20:44:38.8	((Sound of click))	
20:44:39	Captain	TCI (Note: TCI is an abbreviation for Thrust Computer Indicator, part of the aircraft's digital flight guidance system.) was un-set.
20:44:39.8	((Sound of click))	
20:44:42	First officer	Can you get 'em now? There you go.
20:44:43	First officer	They're on now (Note: At this point the autothrottle is now engaged and the aircraft's computer is now in takeoff mode.) and clamped. (Note: This refers to the autothrottle system's clamp mode, which prevents movement of the autothrottle during the takeoff roll. This callout was made when the acronym "CLMP" appeared on the flight mode annunciator.)
20:44:45.6	First officer	Hundred knots.
20:44:46.2	Captain	Kay.
20:44:51	Northwest Airlines Flight 1466 (to Detroit tower)	Northwest fourteen sixty-six, so far that's approved; I'll advise different.
20:44:55	Captain	Fuck. ((Sound of laugh))
20:44:57.1	First officer	V_{1}
20:44:57.7	First officer	Rotate.
20:44:59.1	((Sound similar to nose gear strut extension))	
20:45:02.7	((Sound similar to nose wheel spinning down))	
20:45:05.1	((Sound of stick shaker starts and continues until the end of tape)).	
20:45:09.1	((Sound of secondary stall recognition aural warning starts))	
20:45:11.4	((Sound of secondary stall recognition aural warning starts))	
20:45:11.9	Voice unidentified	(* right up to the V-bar.)
20:45:14.3	((Sound of secondary stall recognition aural warning starts))	
20:45:15.7	Captain	(Ah) fuck.
20:45:17.1	((Sound of secondary stall recognition aural warning starts))	
20:45:18	102UM (to Detroit tower)	Metro tower, lifeguard copter one zero two Uniform Mike is, ah...
20:45:19.3	((Sound of first impact))	
20:45:19.7	((Sound of second impact))	
20:45:22.7	((Sound of third impact))	
Voice unidentified		*
20:45:23.1	((Sound of fourth impact))	
20:45:24.2	((Sound of fifth impact))	
20:45:24.4	((Sound of sixth impact))	
20:45:24.6	((Sound of seventh impact))	
20:45:24.7	End of recording	

== Casualties ==
All six crew members and 148 of the 149 passengers were killed in the accident. Of the passengers who died, 21 were children, the youngest of whom was six months old. Many of the passengers were from the Phoenix metropolitan area, including Nick Vanos, a center for the Phoenix Suns of the NBA. Five foreigners were killed: three Britons, one Bahamian and one Guyanese. Two motorists on nearby Middlebelt Road also died and five people on the ground were injured, one seriously. The bodies were moved to the Northwest hangar at the airport, which served as a temporary morgue.

The sole survivor of the crash was Cecelia Cichan, a four-year-old girl from Tempe, Arizona, who was returning home with her mother, father and six-year-old brother after visiting relatives in Pennsylvania. Romulus firemen found Cichan still belted in her seat, which was facing down, several feet from the bodies of her family. Believing that no one on the aircraft could have survived, officials at first announced that Cichan was an automobile passenger. She sustained third-degree burns and fractures to her skull, collarbone and left leg. After the accident, Cichan lived with her maternal aunt and uncle in Birmingham, Alabama. She spoke to the media about her experience for the first time in 2011. In a 2022 interview for WDIV-TV marking 35 years since the crash, Romulus fireman John Thiede, who had found Cichan, related that he had maintained a friendship with her and had attended her wedding in 2007.

== Investigation ==
The National Transportation Safety Board (NTSB) investigated the accident.

Eyewitnesses stated that Flight 255's takeoff roll was longer than usual and that the aircraft was pitched at a steep angle. The witness statements about the extension of the flaps varied, but most responded that they were extended, although the witnesses could not tell how far.

The cockpit voice recorder (CVR) provided evidence of the flight crew's omission of the taxi checklist. Although a stall warning was annunciated, investigators determined from the CVR that the aural takeoff warning was not provided. The NTSB was unable to determine a cause for the electrical-power failure in the central aural warning system (CAWS):

The failure of the takeoff warning system was caused by the loss of input 28V dc. electric power between the airplane's left dc. bus and the CAWS unit. The interruption of the input power to the CAWS occurred at the P-40 circuit breaker.

The investigators learned that many MD-80 pilots were routinely annoyed by the annunciation of the takeoff-configuration warning ("Slats ... Slats ... Slats ....") that could occur while simply taxiing. It was so common for pilots to pull the P-40 circuit breaker that the area around the circuit breaker was smudged from its frequent manipulation. This could explain why the crew did not hear the warning message. While the investigators felt that the P-40 circuit breaker had most likely been pulled by the pilot on the incident flight, they could not definitely confirm whether the circuit breaker had been tripped or intentionally opened, or whether electric current failed to flow through the breaker to the CAWS while the breaker was closed:

Because the P-40 circuit breaker was badly damaged during the accident, the NTSB could not determine positively its pre-impact condition. Three possible conditions would have caused power to be interrupted at the P-40 circuit breaker—the circuit breaker was intentionally opened by either the flight crew or maintenance personnel, the circuit breaker tripped because of a transient overload and the flight crew did not detect the open circuit breaker, or the circuit breaker did not allow current to flow to the CAWS power supply and did not annunciate the condition by tripping.

=== NTSB conclusions ===
The NTSB published its final report on May 10, 1988, concluding that the accident was caused by pilot error:

The National Transportation Safety Board determines that the probable cause of the accident was the flight crew's failure to use the taxi checklist to ensure that the flaps and slats were extended for takeoff. Contributing to the accident was the absence of electrical power to the airplane takeoff warning system, which thus did not warn the flightcrew that the airplane was not configured properly for takeoff. The reason for the absence of electrical power could not be determined.

The NTSB also found in a simulation that the aircraft could have cleared the light pole and recovered despite having its flaps and slats being in a retracted position:

The sixth profile reflected the airplane's performance with the wing flaps and slats retracted and maintaining an 11° angle of attack, i.e., at or just below the stick shaker activation. In this case, the airplane would have cleared the light pole by 80 feet.

== Aftermath ==
After the accident, Northwest retired the flight number 255 along with its counterpart flight number 254, which was the outbound flight from Phoenix to Detroit. They were changed to 260 and 261 beginning in September 1987 until the company merged with Delta Air Lines in early 2010. It was still operated by the MD-82 along with DC-9s and Boeing 727s, but the planes were replaced with Boeing 757s and Airbus A320s in the 1990s. Delta has continued to retire the 255 flight number.

The accident remains the deadliest in Michigan history, and it was the worst crash in the history of Northwest Airlines. Before the crash of Air India Flight 171 in 2025, it was also the deadliest aviation accident with a sole survivor. (Note: In the collision between All Nippon Airways Flight 58 and a JASDF plane, the pilot of the military aircraft successfully eject.)

== Memorials ==
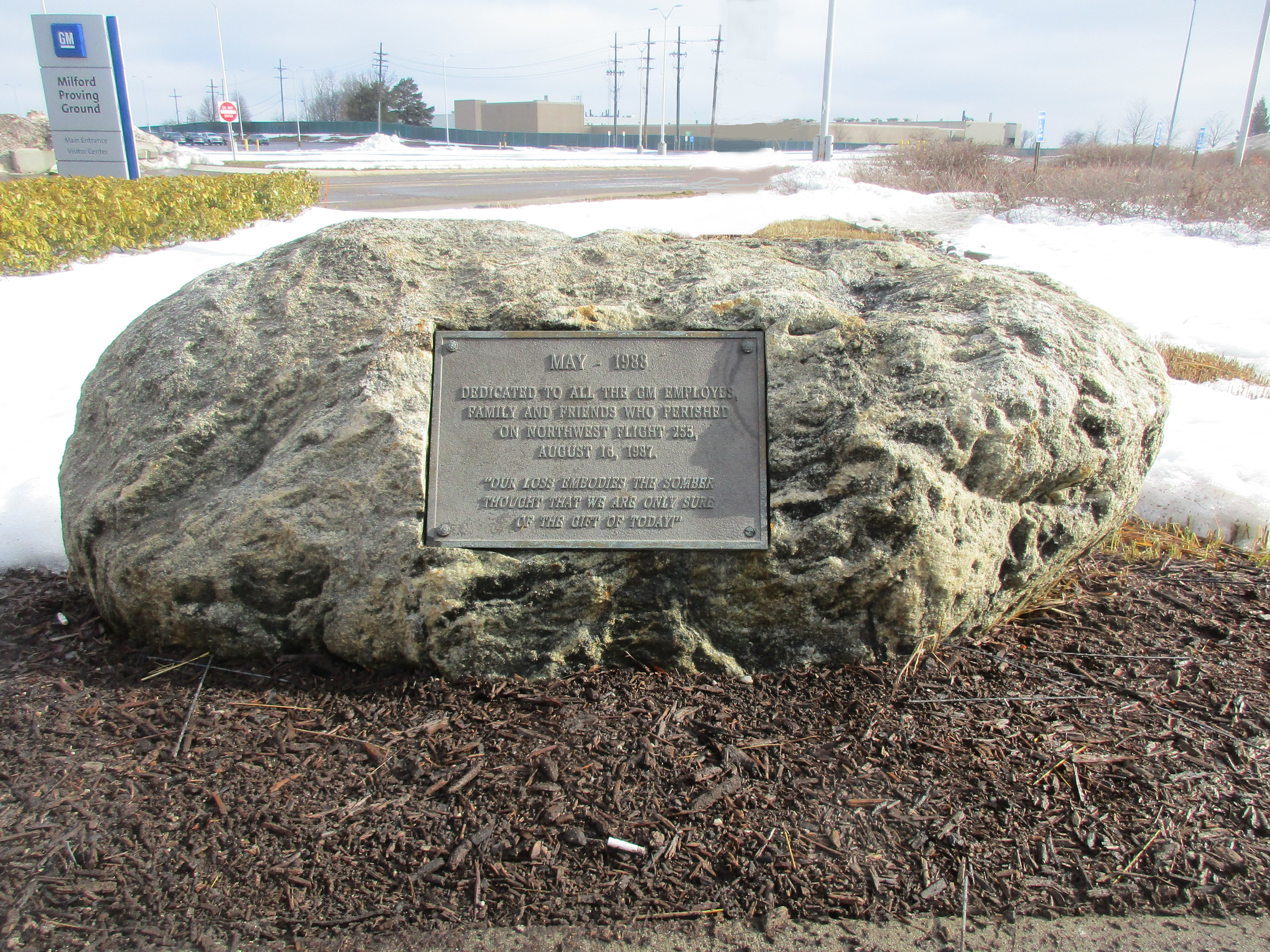
Northwest Flight 255 memorial stone at GM Proving Ground, Milford, Michigan

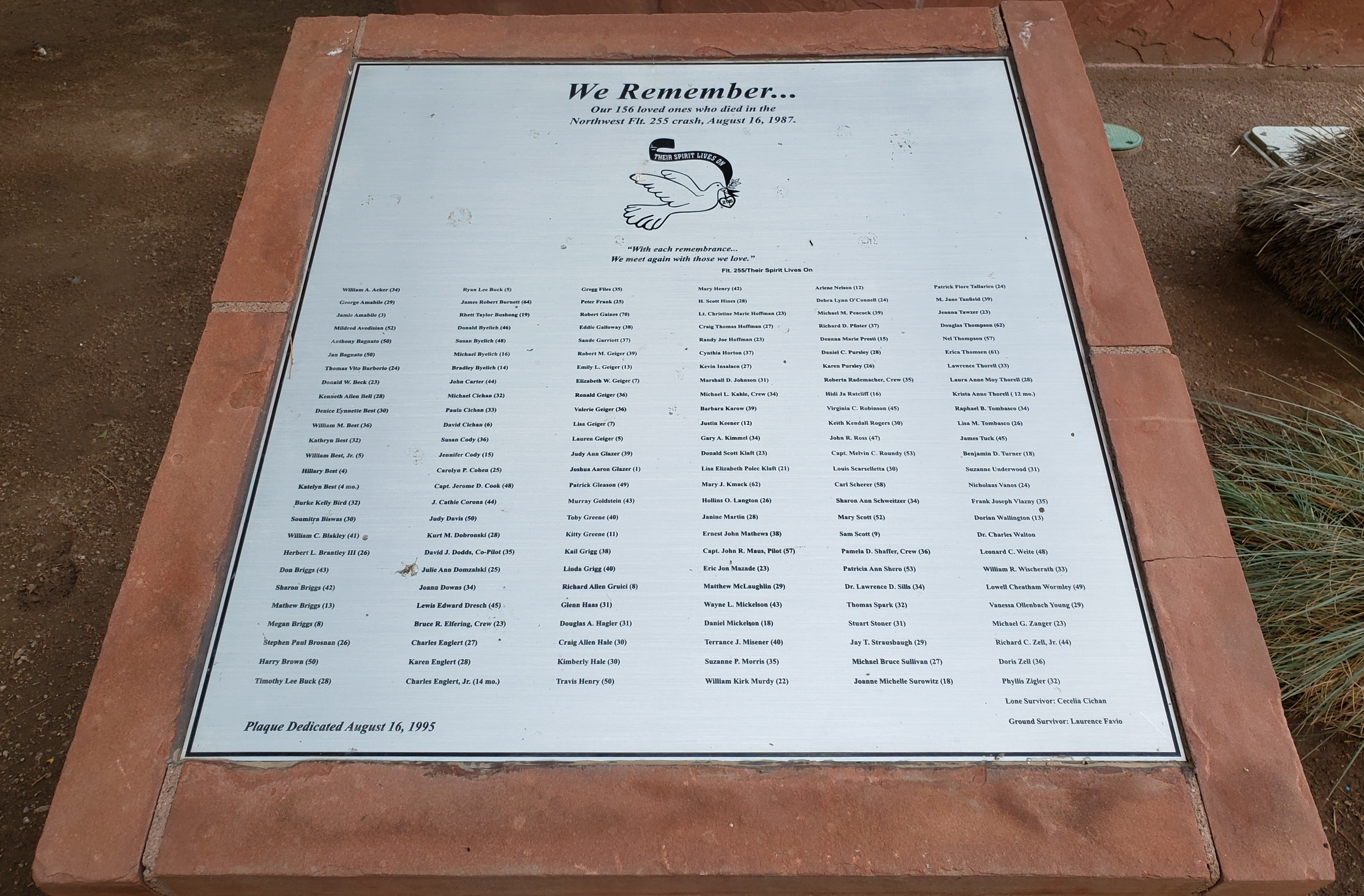
Northwest Flight 255 memorial plaque in downtown Phoenix

In memory of the victims, a black granite memorial was erected in 1994. It is surrounded by blue spruce trees at the top of the hill at Middlebelt Road and I-94, the site of the accident. The memorial features the image of a dove with a ribbon in its beak reading "Their spirit still lives on ..." above the names of those who were killed. Another monument to the victims, many of whom were from the Phoenix area, stands next to Phoenix City Hall. A marker stone is located at the General Motors Proving Ground in Milford, Michigan in memory of the 14 GM employees and seven family members who were killed in the accident. Most were traveling to the GM Desert Proving Ground in Mesa, Arizona.

On August 16, 2007, the 20th anniversary of the accident, a memorial service was held at the site. The service marked the first time that some family members had visited the site since the accident. On August 16, 2012, the 25th anniversary, another memorial service was held at the site, during which a priest read each victim's name aloud. Two more memorial services were held there on August 16, 2017, the 30th anniversary, and on August 16, 2022, the 35th anniversary. Annual meetups have become a tradition.

== In popular culture ==
In 2010, the accident was covered in a season 9 episode of the Canadian television documentary series Mayday titled "Alarming Silence".

Cecilia Cichan, the sole survivor, appeared in the 2013 documentary Sole Survivor, speaking publicly about the crash for the first time.

== See also ==
- Delta Flight 1141, a flight that failed to become airborne because of improper takeoff configuration
- Spanair Flight 5022, another MD-82 flight that failed to become airborne because of improper takeoff configuration
- Lokomotiv Yaroslavl plane crash, an aircraft that failed to become airborne because of pilot error with a sole survivor
- Air India Flight 171, an aircraft that crashed shortly after takeoff with a sole survivor
- List of deadliest aircraft accidents and incidents
- List of sole survivors of aviation accidents and incidents
