= Delta Air Lines Flight 1141 =

1988 aviation accident in Texas

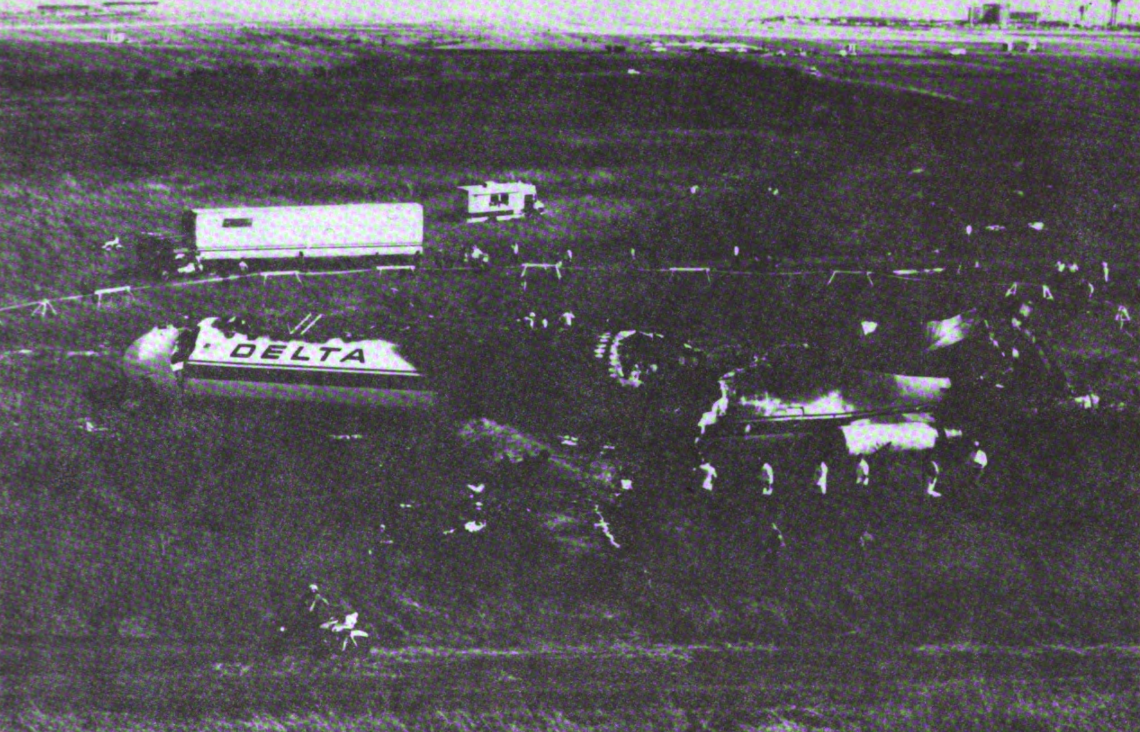
- Wreckage of the aircraft

Accident
- Date: August 31, 1988
- Summary: Crashed on takeoff after failure to configure flaps and slats
- Site: Dallas/Fort Worth Int'l Airport, Euless, Texas, United States; 32°52′13″N 097°03′04″W

Aircraft
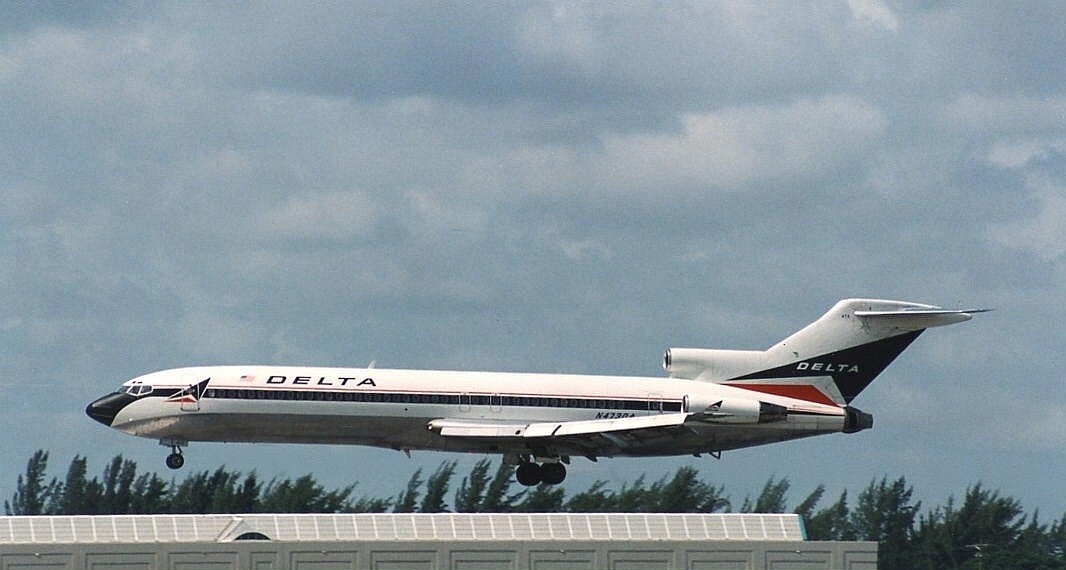
- N473DA, the aircraft involved, seen eight days before the accident
- Aircraft type: Boeing 727-232 Advanced
- Operator: Delta Air Lines
- IATA flight No.: DL1141
- ICAO flight No.: DAL1141
- Call sign: DELTA 1141
- Registration: N473DA
- Flight origin: Jackson Municipal Airport
- Stopover: Dallas/Fort Worth Int'l Airport
- Destination: Salt Lake City International Airport
- Occupants: 108
- Passengers: 101
- Crew: 7
- Fatalities: 14
- Injuries: 76
- Survivors: 94

Delta Air Lines Flight 1141 was a scheduled domestic passenger flight between Dallas Fort Worth International Airport, Texas, and Salt Lake City International Airport, Utah. On August 31, 1988, the flight, operated by a Boeing 727-200 series aircraft, crashed during takeoff at Dallas Fort Worth International Airport, resulting in 14 deaths and 76 injuries among the 108 on board. The cause of the crash was the crew's failure to configure the airplane's flaps or slats for takeoff. The aircraft's take-off warning system (TOWS) also malfunctioned and failed to warn the crew of the problem. Recordings from the cockpit voice recorder revealed that the crew had improperly engaged in casual conversation on various matters unrelated to the operation of the flight, which may have distracted them from properly performing their duties. The recordings, which were broadcast repeatedly by the press, proved so embarrassing that a law was subsequently passed to prohibit the release of cockpit voice recordings. Since the passage of that law, only written transcripts have been released rather than the voice recordings themselves.

== Aircraft ==
The aircraft was a Boeing 727-232 Advanced, MSN 20750, registered as N473DA, a three-engine narrow-body jet aircraft. It was delivered to Delta Air Lines in November 1973, and was the 992nd Boeing 727 to be manufactured. The aircraft had logged around 43,023 airframe hours and was powered by three Pratt & Whitney JT8D-15 turbofan engines.

== Crew ==
The flight crew consisted of Captain Larry Lon Davis (48), First Officer Carey Wilson Kirkland (37), and flight engineer Steven Mark Judd (30). Captain Davis was a highly experienced pilot, with a total of approximately 17,000 flight hours, 7,000 of which had been in the 727. First Officer Kirkland had a total of 6,500 flight hours, with 4,500 hours in the 727. Flight Engineer Judd had a total of 3,000 flight hours, including 600 hours in the 727.

The cabin crew consisted of four flight attendants: Dixie Dunn (56) with 33 years' service at Delta; Diana George (40) with 20 years' service; Rosilyn Marr (43) with 23 years' service; and Mary O'Neill (57) with 32 years' service.

== Accident ==
Flight 1141 was a regularly scheduled passenger flight from Jackson Municipal Airport in Jackson, Mississippi, to Salt Lake City International Airport in Salt Lake City, Utah, with an intermediate stop at Dallas/Fort Worth International Airport (DFW) in North Texas. The Wednesday morning flight from Jackson to DFW was uneventful, and Flight 1141 arrived at DFW at 07:38 CDT. For the flight from DFW to Salt Lake City, Flight 1141 had 101 passengers and seven crew members on board.

At 08:30, Flight 1141 departed from the gate at DFW and was cleared by the ground controller to taxi to runway 18L. The aircraft was instructed to line up on the runway and hold for one minute due to the possibility of wake turbulence from an American Airlines McDonnell Douglas DC-10 that was departing. The crew requested to extend the hold to two minutes, which was granted. The crew talked to the flight attendants for a while about what they would say on the cockpit recorder in case they crashed. Eventually this chat ceased as the crew was cleared for takeoff. The takeoff was normal until the main wheels left the ground, at which point the aircraft commenced a violent rolling motion and the right wing dropped. The aircraft's tail made contact with the runway briefly, and 650 feet (200 m) later, the right wingtip struck the runway. The aircraft developed compressor surges (due to breakdown of the airflow through the engine), and was unable to gain altitude or maintain stabilized flight. Approximately 900 feet (270 m) beyond the end of runway 18L, the plane's right wing hit the ILS localizer antenna, which set the wing on fire and caused it to start disintegrating while the plane was still in flight. The aircraft remained airborne for another 400 feet (120 m) before it struck the ground, sliding sideways, disintegrating the aircraft's left wing and leaving a trail of wreckage 800 feet (240 m) long before finally coming to a rest 3,200 feet (980 m) from the end of the runway. Fire erupted in the right wing area and quickly spread and engulfed the rear of the aircraft. The total flight time was 22 seconds, from liftoff to the first ground impact.

== Casualties ==
Two of the four flight attendants (Dunn and Marr) and 12 of the 101 passengers on board died in the accident. Medical examinations determined that all but one of the fatalities were due to smoke inhalation. One passenger, who had successfully exited the aircraft, attempted to re-enter the aircraft in order to assist his wife and other passengers still trapped inside; he suffered severe burns and died 11 days after the accident from his injuries.

Captain Davis, First Officer Kirkland, two cabin crew members, and 22 passengers were seriously injured. Flight Engineer Judd and 49 passengers received minor injuries; 18 passengers received no injuries. Many of the passengers reported that impact forces were not severe and mostly concentrated towards the back of the aircraft. Captain Davis suffered severe fractures to the rib cage and spine that required surgery. First Officer Kirkland was badly bruised and sustained a concussion. Flight Engineer Judd sustained injuries to his abdomen.

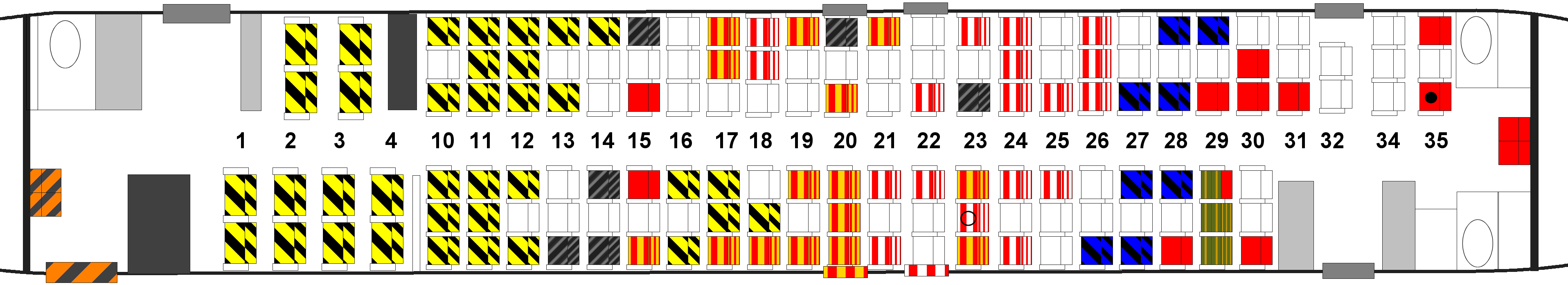
Seating chart for Flight 1141 including occupant survival and, if known, escape route.

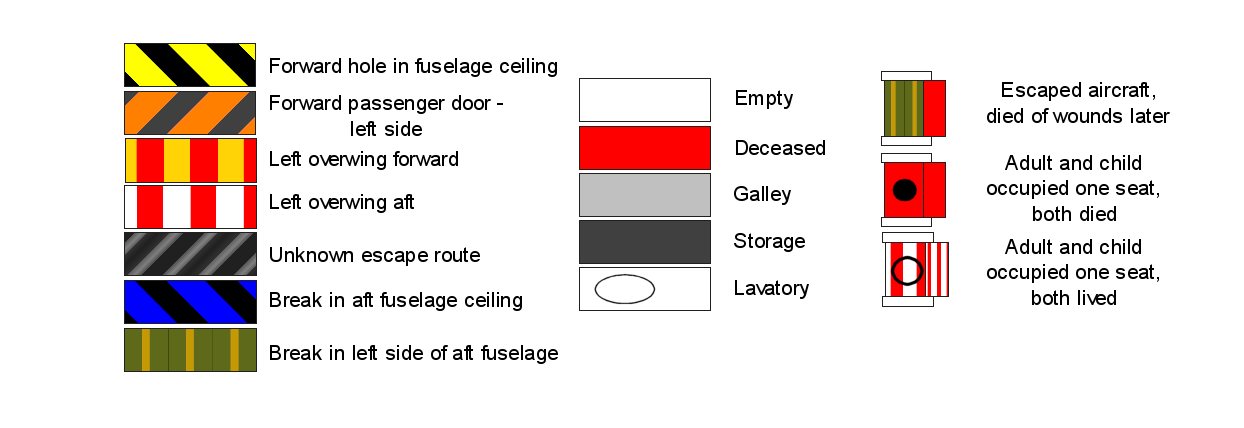
Legend

== Investigation ==
=== Aircraft performance ===
The National Transportation Safety Board (NTSB) investigation into the accident attempted to reconstruct the aircraft's performance based on reports from witnesses and survivors. Witnesses reported that the plane attempted to climb at a higher than normal angle, and that the plane rolled from side to side and appeared to be out of control. Based on examination of the wreckage, the NTSB determined that collision with the instrument landing system (ILS) localizer antenna array approximately 900 feet (270 m) beyond the departure end of the runway 18L led to the breakup of the aircraft. Leaking jet fuel started a fire that quickly engulfed the fuselage. Engine #3 had separated from the empennage. Passengers reported that the plane appeared to shake violently on takeoff. Witnesses on the ground claimed that one of the engines was on fire, but although the engine was badly crushed from ground impact, there was no sign of fire or heat damage. Delta officials quickly reacted to questions about the 727's operating and maintenance condition by pointing out that the original factory engines from 1973 (when the plane was initially purchased by the airline) had been replaced in the last few years by a newer model that ran more quietly and used less fuel. They also stated that there were no known mechanical or maintenance problems with the plane prior to the flight.

The NTSB examined why the plane was unable to climb once it departed the runway. After conducting airplane performance studies, the NTSB determined that the events of Flight 1141 could only be explained by the aircraft attempting to take off without its flaps and slats extended to the proper take-off configuration. The aircraft's instability and sudden roll to the right was consistent with known performance of the Boeing 727 with the flaps and slats retracted. The captain continued to pull back on the control column in an attempt to keep the plane's nose raised, which created turbulence over the rear-mounted engines and caused the compressor surges. Nonetheless, the NTSB concluded that the compressor surges would not have significantly reduced the engines' thrust, and that the plane's failure to gain speed was due to aerodynamic drag on the aircraft due to the high angle of attack, rather than a loss of engine thrust. The NTSB found that the cockpit voice recorder (CVR) recorded the captain and first officer announcing the deployment of the flaps but the sound of flap lever movement is never heard. Based on the aircraft's failure to climb at takeoff speed, its roll instability, the position of the flap's jackscrews in the fully retracted position, and the absence of sounds indicating the flaps or slats were deployed, the NTSB determined that the plane's failure to climb resulted from the flight crew's failure to deploy the flaps and slats as required by the preflight checklist.

Based on the lack of warning sounds on the CVR, the NTSB also determined that the plane's take-off warning system (TOWS), designed to alert the crew if the engines are throttled to take-off power without the flaps and slats being correctly set, failed to alert the pilots to their improper takeoff configuration. The switch that operated the TOWS in the incident aircraft had been previously modified, per Boeing instructions, to prevent nuisance activations during aircraft taxiing. A fleet-wide Boeing 727 inspection, ordered by the Federal Aviation Administration (FAA) following the Flight 1141 crash, identified 35 anomalies in the TOWS out of 1,190 aircraft examined. The FAA had recommended that the Boeing 727 TOWS be changed from a system activated by the aircraft throttles to one activated by engine pressure ratio (EPR), and while Delta owned Boeing 727s that had an EPR-activated TOWS, these were all aircraft that Delta had acquired from other airlines, and Delta did not convert its own aircraft to an EPR-activated system. The NTSB concluded that the TOWS had not activated because it had an intermittent problem that was not detected or corrected during the aircraft's last maintenance action.

=== Crew and airline performance ===
The NTSB investigated the relationship between crew performance and the events in the accident. FAA regulations require a sterile cockpit before takeoff, which prohibits conversation unrelated to the aircraft and the pending flight. The crew disregarded this regulation, and the CVR recorded the flight crew and a flight attendant talking about the CVR itself, the crash of Continental Airlines Flight 1713 and the crash of American Airlines Flight 191 – even joking that they should discuss "the dating habits of our flight attendants", as the Continental crew had, "in case we crashed", so that "the media would have some kind of a juicy tidbit." Also discussed were the upcoming presidential election, drink mixes, and various other topics. Of the flight crew, the first officer was most actively engaged in these nonessential conversations, with the captain only occasionally joining in. Although the captain did not consistently participate, he also failed to stop the first officer's repeated interruptions and chatter with the flight attendant. The NTSB determined that, if the captain had taken a more active role in managing the cockpit, the accident might have been prevented.

Shortly after an NTSB hearing in which the CVR transcripts were discussed, all three members of the flight crew were fired from Delta. Additionally, the airline itself was also faulted. The NTSB determined that Delta did not insist on standardized crew cockpit management, and that flight crews were allowed significant latitude in their conduct. This lax corporate philosophy contributed to the poor discipline and performance of Flight 1141's flight crew. The NTSB also found that the FAA was already aware of deficiencies in Delta's operations regarding flight crew performance and behavior, and said that neither Delta nor the FAA had taken sufficient corrective action to address the problems.

=== Probable cause and dissent ===
On September 26, 1989, the NTSB published its final accident report. In it, the NTSB ultimately determined that there were two probable causes for the accident: (1) inadequate cockpit discipline that resulted in the flight crew's failure to extend the aircraft's flaps and slats to proper take-off configuration, and (2) the failure of the plane's TOWS to sound and alert the crew that their plane was not properly configured for takeoff. Contributing to the accident was Delta's slow implementation of changes to its flight crew management programs, a lack of sufficiently aggressive FAA action to compel Delta to correct known deficiencies, and a lack of sufficient accountability within the FAA's air carrier inspection process.

One member of the safety board, Jim Burnett, dissented from the NTSB's probable cause statement. While Burnett concurred with the accident report's facts and findings, he believed that the actions of the FAA and Delta were direct causes of the accident and not merely contributing factors. Burnett's dissent proposed a probable cause statement that included the two probable causes named in the main report, while adding a third probable cause:

Also causal to the accident was the failure of Delta Air Lines' management to provide leadership and guidance to its flightcrews through its training and check airmen programs to promote and foster optimum cockpit management procedures, and the failure of the Federal Aviation Administration to correct known deficiencies in the training and check airmen programs of Delta Air Lines.

Furthermore, the investigation found that the crash was not inevitable, and the airplane could have recovered despite the retraction of the flaps and slats:

Although a clean wing is not an authorized takeoff configuration for the B-727, the airplane performance analysis showed that a marginal climb capability was available if stickshaker Angle-Of-Attack (AOA) had not been exceeded and/or if maximum power had been applied within 3 seconds of initial stickshaker activation.

== Aftermath ==
Although the NTSB specifically faulted the captain and first officer for the accident, and did not fault Judd (the flight engineer), Judd was unable to find work as a commercial pilot after being fired from Delta. A former Navy pilot, Judd worked as a reserve pilot at Naval Air Station Dallas while appealing against his firing, and was later reinstated by Delta.

Media broadcast of the CVR tapes, which demonstrated why the crew failed to extend the airplane's flaps or slats for takeoff, provoked such an outcry by pilots that subsequent releases of CVR data have been restricted by law and carefully vetted by the NTSB. The law prohibits the NTSB from generally releasing CVR transcripts or recordings; while an exception permits the NTSB to release transcripts related to a safety investigation, there is no exception permitting the NTSB to release copies of the actual recordings.

== Dramatization ==
The accident was featured in the third episode of season 18 of Mayday, titled "Deadly Distraction".

== See also ==
- Northwest Airlines Flight 255 – (1987) MD-82, TOWS failed to sound, possibly due to cockpit crew having deliberately disabled it.
- LAPA Flight 3142 – (1999) Boeing 737-200, TOWS sounded but ignored by cockpit crew.
- Mandala Airlines Flight 091 – (2005) Boeing 737-200, TOWS not heard on CVR and possibly failed to sound.
- Spanair Flight 5022 – (2008) MD-82, TOWS failed to sound.
