= Spanair Flight 5022 =

2008 aviation accident in Spain

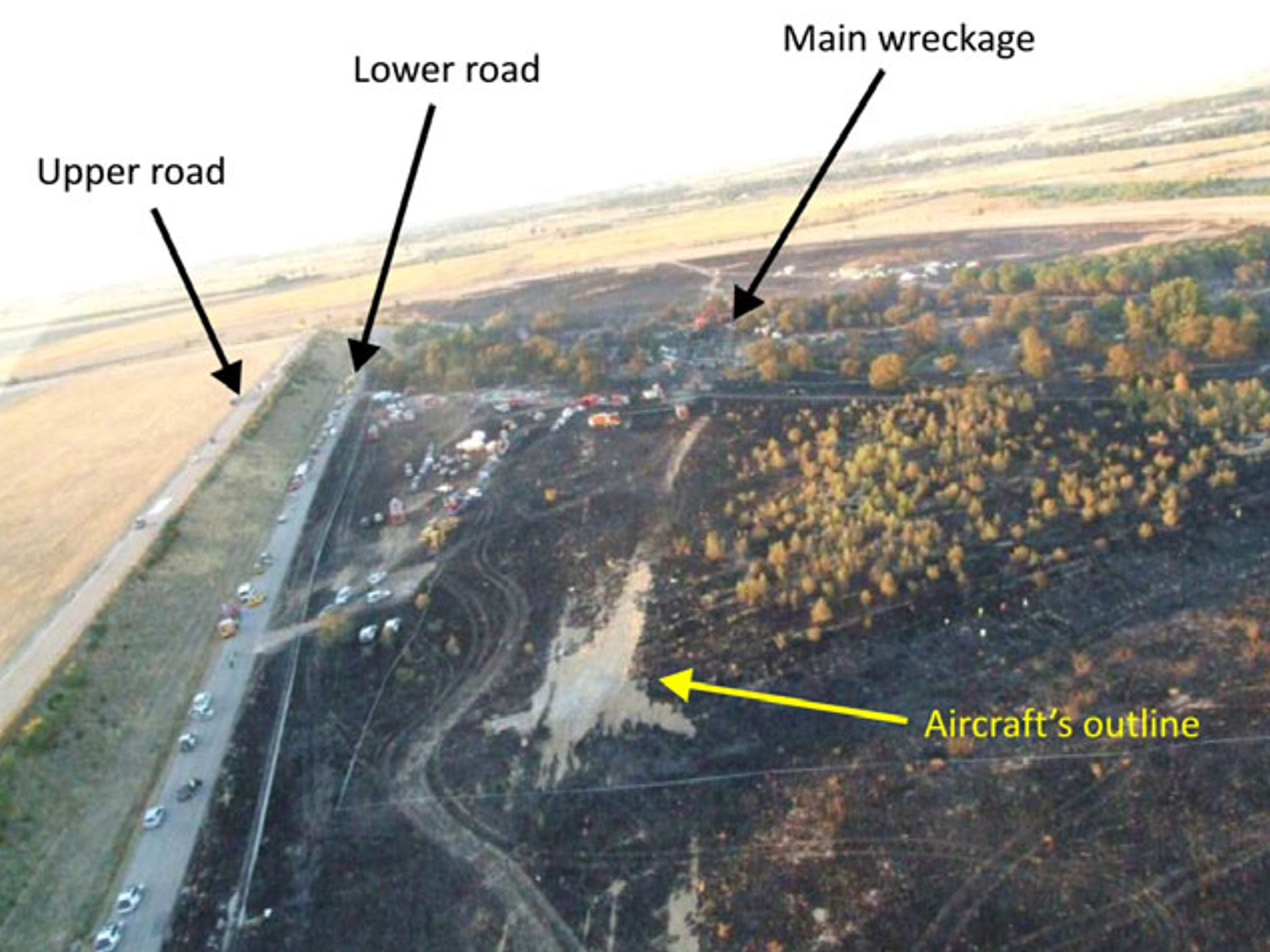
- Aerial view of the crash site

Accident
- Date: 20 August 2008
- Summary: Crashed on take-off, loss of control due to improper takeoff configuration
- Site: Madrid–Barajas Airport, Madrid, Spain; 40°31′51″N 003°34′14″W

Aircraft
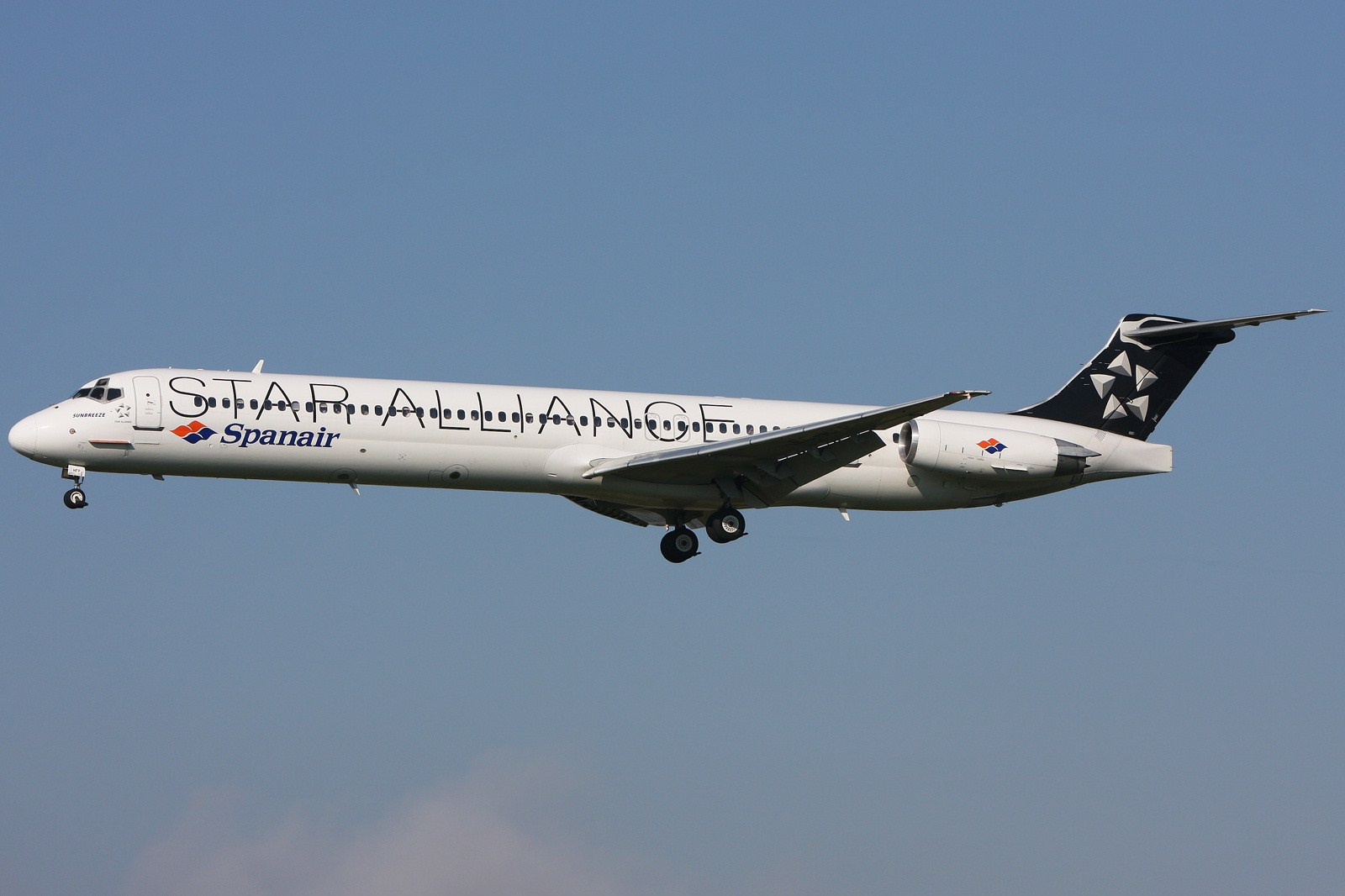
- EC-HFP, the aircraft involved in the accident, seen in July 2008
- Aircraft type: McDonnell Douglas MD-82
- Aircraft name: Sunbreeze
- Operator: Spanair
- IATA flight No.: JK5022
- ICAO flight No.: JKK5022
- Call sign: SPANAIR 5022
- Registration: EC-HFP
- Flight origin: Barcelona–El Prat Airport
- Stopover: Madrid–Barajas Airport
- Destination: Gran Canaria Airport
- Occupants: 172
- Passengers: 166
- Crew: 6
- Fatalities: 154
- Injuries: 18
- Survivors: 18

Spanair Flight 5022 was a scheduled domestic passenger flight from Barcelona–El Prat Airport to Gran Canaria Airport, Spain, with a stopover in Madrid–Barajas Airport that crashed just after take-off from runway 36L at Madrid-Barajas Airport at 14:24 CEST (12:24 UTC) on 20 August 2008. The aircraft was a McDonnell Douglas MD-82, registration EC-HFP. Of the 172 passengers and crew on board, 154 died and 18 survived.

It was the first fatal accident for Spanair, and the worst crash to occur in Spain in 25 years. The accident further worsened Spanair's negative image at the time and exacerbated its financial difficulties. Spanair ceased operations on 27 January 2012.

== Flight and aircraft ==
Map showing crash location

The aircraft, named Sunbreeze (registration EC-HFP; constructor's number 53148), had been manufactured in late 1993 and delivered to Korean Air, and entered service with Spanair in July 1999.

There were 166 passengers and six crew members on board, including the 39-year-old captain, Antonio Garcia Luna, and the 31-year-old first officer, Francisco Javier Mulet.

=== Prior to the accident ===
Fifty-nine minutes before the flight's second attempted take-off, the pilots had abandoned a departure because of excessive temperatures in the ram air turbine (RAT) probe. The aircraft was taken to a parking area where maintenance workers de-activated the RAT probe's heater. The aircraft was permitted to fly with an inoperable RAT probe heater because icing was not expected during the flight. Another takeoff was then attempted, during which the accident occurred.

=== Accident ===
The accident occurred during the second attempt, at 14:24 local time, due to the pilots' failure to deploy the flaps and slats as required for takeoff. Without the use of these "high-lift" devices, the wings could not generate enough lift to keep the aircraft airborne. (Note: The basic shape of all aircraft wings is designed for optimum speed and fuel-efficiency during cruise flight (at around 500mph/430 knots TAS [true airspeed] in the MD-82). At lower speeds, such as those associated with take-offs and landings (typically 160mph), the lift generated by the wings is much less than at cruise speed – or would be were it not for the use of high-lift devices such as flaps and slats. For low-speed flight, the pilot alters the shape of the wing by deploying the flaps and slats. For take-off, this is done during the pre-takeoff checks, before entering the runway; on the MD-82, flaps and slats are controlled by a single lever on the cockpit's central console. The flaps are located at the trailing edge of the wings and, when deployed, extend backward and downward from the wing. The slats extend forward from the leading edge of the wing. The effect of both flaps and slats is to increase the surface area and "camber" of the wing, thereby increasing the amount of lift produced. See flaps and slats for more information.) The MD-80 has a warning system (the take-off warning system or TOWS) that should have alerted the pilots that the aircraft was not correctly configured for take-off. However, the warning did not sound, and the pilots continued with the attempt. As the aircraft took off, it stalled and impacted the terrain right of the runway strip, disintegrating and bursting into flames.

==== Crash sequence ====
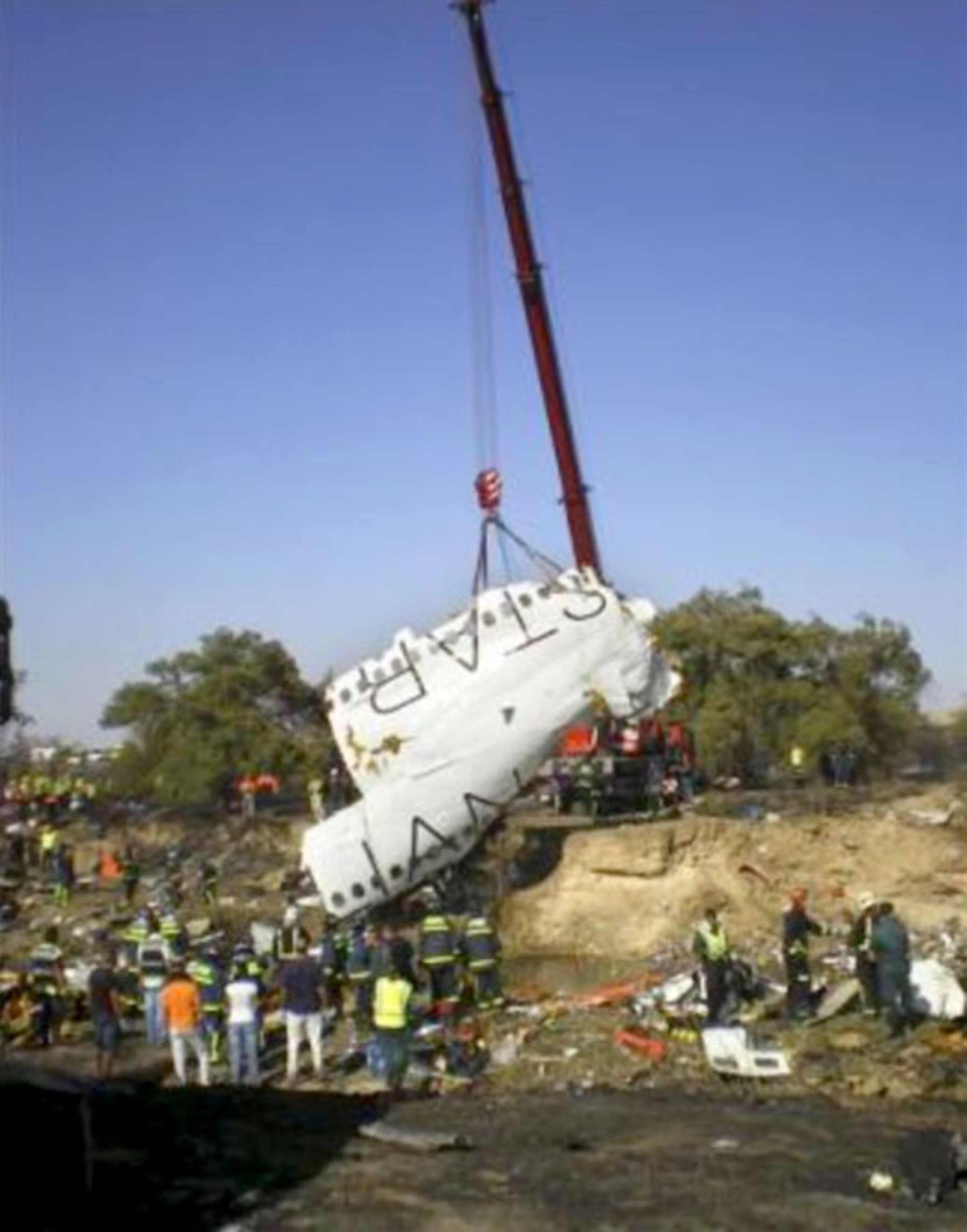
Wreckage of the aircraft's forward fuselage

Just 4 seconds after liftoff the aircraft started shaking and banking to both sides. The stall warning horn activated as well as the synthetic voice. The first officer announced engine failure in a doubtful voice, and reduced power on both engines, especially on the right one, increasing the bank angle to the right to 20 degrees. Immediately after this, he pushed the engines to full power and the pitch increased to 18 degrees. The aircraft impacted the ground just right of the runway with its tail section first, then its right wingtip and its right engine. The aircraft travelled on the ground, causing some components to detach from the aircraft. The aircraft then lost contact with the ground as it passed down a 5.5-metre (18 ft) embankment, and suffered major damage when it struck an upslope at the bottom: the landing gear and the engines detached, the tail was torn off and the cockpit collapsed into the passenger area. The aircraft continued sliding on the ground until it reached De la Vega stream and collided with the riverbank. The front third of the fuselage came to rest upside-down on the stream bed. The rest of the fuselage and the wings ended up on the north side of the stream where they were destroyed by fire.

== Victims ==
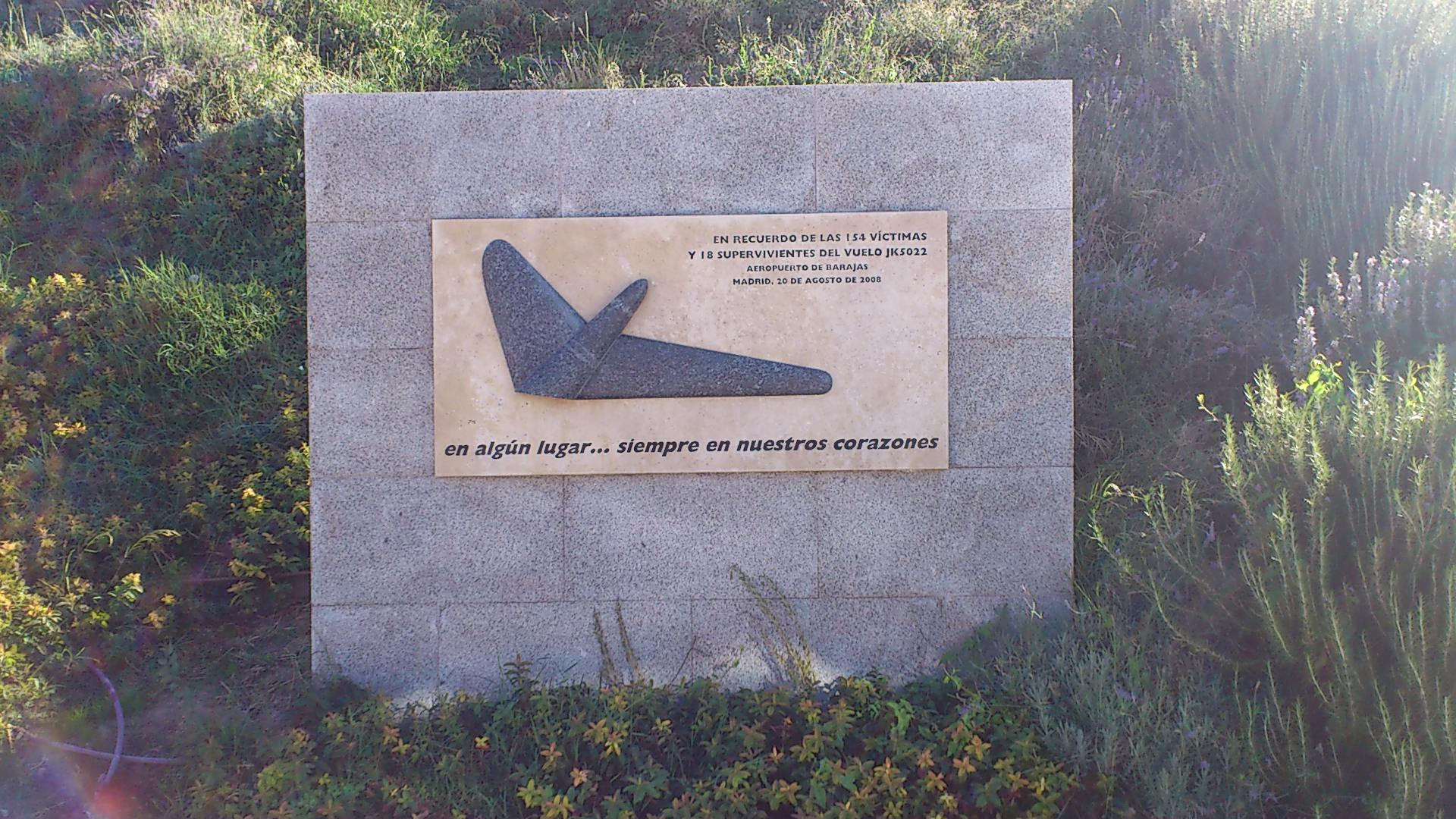
Memorial plaque commemorating the 154 victims of JK5022

Most of the dead and 16 of the survivors were Spanish nationals. Nineteen of the dead and two survivors were of other nationalities.

153 of the victims were pronounced dead on the day of the accident, and one passenger died in hospital 3 days later. Forensic analyses showed that 119 (73%) of the victims were killed primarily by the post-impact fire, while 32 were from traumatic injuries (including both pilots), 2 from drowning and 1 from smoke inhalation.

All 18 survivors were seated in the first 9 rows of seats. The crash threw some of the survivors clear of the wreckage and into a stream, lessening the severity of their burns. A 30-year-old woman with British and Spanish dual citizenship survived with a punctured lung and broken left arm but no burns, as she was thrown from row 6, still attached to her seat, into the stream.

== Investigation ==
The accident was investigated by the Civil Aviation Accident and Incident Investigation Commission (CIAIAC). Representatives from the US National Transportation Safety Board, the aircraft manufacturer Boeing (as successor to McDonnell Douglas, the original aircraft manufacturer), and the engine manufacturer Pratt and Whitney supported the investigation.

A preliminary report on the accident was released by CIAIAC on 6 October 2008. Information extracted from the flight data recorder showed that the aircraft had taken off with flaps at 0°, and that the alarm for that abnormal takeoff configuration had not sounded. The report hinted at no other cause of the accident. Both the engines and thrust reversers were excluded as causes of the accident.

On 17 August 2009, CIAIAC released an interim report on the incident. The interim report confirmed the preliminary report's findings and added further evidence that the take off had been carried out with the flaps and slats retracted. The cockpit recordings revealed that the pilots omitted the "set and check the flap/slat lever and lights" item in the After Start checklist. In the Takeoff Imminent verification checklist the copilot had simply repeated the correct flap and slat position values without actually checking them, as shown by the physical evidence. All three safety barriers provided to avoid the takeoff in an inappropriate configuration were defeated: the configuration checklist, the confirm and verify checklist, and the Take-off Warning System (TOWS). The report also made safety recommendations intended to prevent accidents like this from happening again.

CIAIAC published a further progress note in August 2010, and its final report in July 2011.

=== Theories ===
==== Fire or explosion ====
Some early eye-witness accounts suggested that the aircraft suffered an engine fire or explosion before crashing, but the Spanish airport authority AENA released a video showing that the engines neither exploded nor caught fire during take-off. Manuel Bautista, Director General of Spain's civil aviation authority, went as far as to state: "The engine is not the cause of the accident", surmising that a chain of events combining was more likely than a single cause.

==== Temperature sensor ====
The faulty air temperature probe (the RAT sensor, (Note: The aircraft's computer uses ram air temperature, also known as total air temperature, to help calculate the aircraft's true airspeed. True airspeed is needed for high altitude navigation, but is not so important for maintaining stable flight. Ground Speed is calculated directly from GPS position change (or Inertial navigation position change on earlier models). When TAS (true airspeed) is compared with Groundspeed, however, the actual wind direction and speed at that altitude can be calculated and presented to the pilot. Indicated airspeed, a measure of the relative wind over the aircraft's surfaces, is a more important measure for ensuring stable, safe flight. The aircraft's stall speed closely relates to indicated airspeed, for example.) located on the front of the aircraft near the cockpit) initially caused the pilot to turn the aircraft back for maintenance before the second takeoff attempt. The mechanic deactivated the probe because the aircraft's Minimum Equipment List allowed it to be left inoperative. On 22 August investigators interviewed the mechanic, who defended his action by saying that it had nothing to do with the crash. Spanair supported the mechanic's view that deactivation of the probe was an accepted procedure. Spanair stated that the problem detected on the first takeoff attempt was overheating caused by a temperature gauge's de-icing system, rather than a malfunction of the temperature gauge itself, and that since icing was not a risk on that flight, the de-icing system had been deactivated by the mechanic with the captain's approval.

On 11 May 2010, leaked details from the cockpit voice recorder (CVR) were released by Spanish media. The recording showed that both pilots were concerned about a repair job performed earlier on the day of the crash, in which mechanics used an ice pack to cool an overheating temperature sensor and removed a fuse. The BBC reported that the judge investigating the crash was to question three mechanics on suspicion of manslaughter. These were the head of maintenance for Spanair at Barajas and the two mechanics who checked the aircraft before take-off. On 19 September 2012 the criminal case against mechanic Felipe García and his supervisor, José Antonio Viñuela, who together faced 154 counts of involuntary manslaughter and 18 counts of injuries, was shelved, leaving the defunct airline to face civil charges.

==== Thrust reverser ====
Pictures of the wreckage showed one of the thrust reversers in the deployed position, (Note: Thrust reversers are normally employed just after touch down to reduce braking distances.) and an early theory constructed in the media was that the thrust reverser of the No. 2 (right side) engine activated during the climb causing the aircraft to yaw suddenly to the right. This theory fell apart for three reasons: firstly, aircraft engineer Alberto Garcia pointed out that the MD-82 has tail-mounted engines positioned close to each other and to the aircraft's longitudinal axis, so that any yaw from asymmetric thrust would be small. Secondly, examination of the aircraft's maintenance logs showed that the thrust reverser on the right-side engine had been deactivated pending repair. It had been wired shut, and tape placed over the cockpit control to alert the crew. The MD-82 is permitted to fly with just one operable thrust reverser. Thirdly, the engine which had been pictured was the left engine, not the right one. The investigation concluded that the position of its thrust reverser was a result of the accident, not a cause of it.

==== Flaps and slats ====
El Mundo reported that the CVR showed that the pilot had said "Flaps OK, Slats OK" to the co-pilot. The article confirmed that the flaps had not been extended and that the alarm for that condition had not sounded. The final report concluded that the failure to deploy flaps was the cause of the accident.

The maintenance logbook of the aircraft has comments, two days before the crash, for an "autoslats failure" visual alarm occurring on slats extension; however autoslats are not used on takeoff, and it cannot be inferred that the slats system had a defect.

==== Flight mode ====
In an article published on 7 September, El Mundo suggested that during the flight preparation and takeoff attempts, the aircraft had some of its systems in flight mode rather than ground mode. Investigators noted that one particular ground-sensing relay (relay R2-5) was responsible for de-energizing the RAT probe heater when on the ground, and for inhibiting TOWS when in the air. They theorised that a fault in this relay could explain both the overheating of the probe and why the flaps and slats alarm had not sounded. When the R2-5 relay was recovered from the wreckage it was subjected to detailed examination. Two stuck contacts within the relay were identified, which would explain the overheating both on the day of the accident and the intermittent incidents recorded over the previous few days. That fault, however, would not have affected the operation of the TOWS system, and no fault was found that would have affected TOWS.

James W. Hudspeth, an investigator of a previous near accident (an MD-83, starting from Lanzarote) that was superficially similar, pointed out that the fuse of the so-called "left ground control relay" at position K-33 of the control panel might have been the actual culprit in the erroneous flight mode. Hudspeth found out during a 2-week investigation at Lanzarote that it is customary in normal maintenance routine to temporarily remove this circuit-breaker to engage flight mode, but the circuit-breaker is afterwards sometimes not replaced correctly. Because of the frequent handling of this circuit-breaker, it is also not easy to visually check that it is set properly. The CIAIAC team on the case of JK 5022 discounted this possibility because if the circuit-breaker had been left open it would also have affected the operation of the stall warning system, and the CVR recording showed that the stall warning system was functioning normally.

==== Malware ====
Spanish daily El País reported that, as revealed in an internal report issued by Spanair, malware which had infected the airline's central computer system used to monitor technical problems with its aircraft may have resulted in a failure to raise an alarm over multiple problems with the aircraft. A judge ordered the airline to provide all the computer system's logs from the days before and after the crash.

=== Final report ===
The CIAIAC published its final report into the accident on 26 July 2011.

It determined that the cause of the accident was:

- The crew lost control of the aircraft as a result of a stall immediately after takeoff, which was caused by an incorrect configuration for take-off (i.e. not deploying the flaps and slats, following a series of errors and omissions), coupled with the absence of any warning of the incorrect configuration.
- The crew did not recognise the indications of stall, and did not correct the situation after takeoff, and – by momentarily retarding the engine power and increasing the pitch angle – brought the aircraft closer to a stall condition.
- The crew did not detect the configuration error because they did not properly use the checklists to select and check the position of the flaps and slats during flight preparation, specifically:
  - they failed to select the flaps/slats lever during the corresponding step in the "After Start" checklist;
  - they did not cross-check the position of the lever and the state of the flaps/slats indicator lights during the "After Start" checklist;
  - they omitted the flaps/slats check on the 'Take Off Briefing' (taxi) checklist;
  - no visual inspection of the flaps and slats was carried out in execution of the "Final Items" step of the "Take Off Imminent" checklist.

The CIAIAC determined the following contributory factors:

- The absence of any warning of the incorrect take-off configuration because the TOWS did not work. It was not possible to determine conclusively the cause of this failure.
- Inadequate crew resource management (CRM), which did not prevent the deviation from procedures and omissions in flight preparation.

In addition, the CIAIAC's analysis found that flight may have been possible despite the flaps and slats being in the retracted position, however it would have required a lower pitch angle and stable wings. They concluded that the best way for the pilots to have recovered from the stall would have been to simply extend the flaps.

== In media ==
- "Deadly Delay", a 2016 episode of Mayday, covered the investigation into the crash.
- "Stalling on Takeoff", episode 33 of the Black Box Down podcast from Rooster Teeth, discussed the incident.
- The Last Flight of the Sunbreeze, a Spanish documentary about the crash.

== See also ==
- Northwest Airlines Flight 255 – another MD-82 that crashed on take-off, due to improper configuration
- Delta Air Lines Flight 1141 – a Boeing 727 that crashed on take-off, due to improper configuration
- List of aircraft accidents and incidents resulting in at least 50 fatalities
