= Flight 705 =

Flight 705 may refer to:

Aircraft and flights

- Northwest Airlines Flight 705, a Boeing 720B that broke up in midair in a severe thunderstorm and crashed into the Florida Everglades shortly after take-off from Miami International Airport on February 12, 1963, killing all aboard
- PIA Flight 705, a Boeing 720-040B that crashed while descending to land at Cairo International Airport on 20 May 1965
- FedEx Flight 705, a McDonnell Douglas DC-10-30 that experienced an attempted hijacking for the purpose of a suicide attack on April 7, 1994
