= Middle East Airlines Flight 438 =

1976 airliner bombing

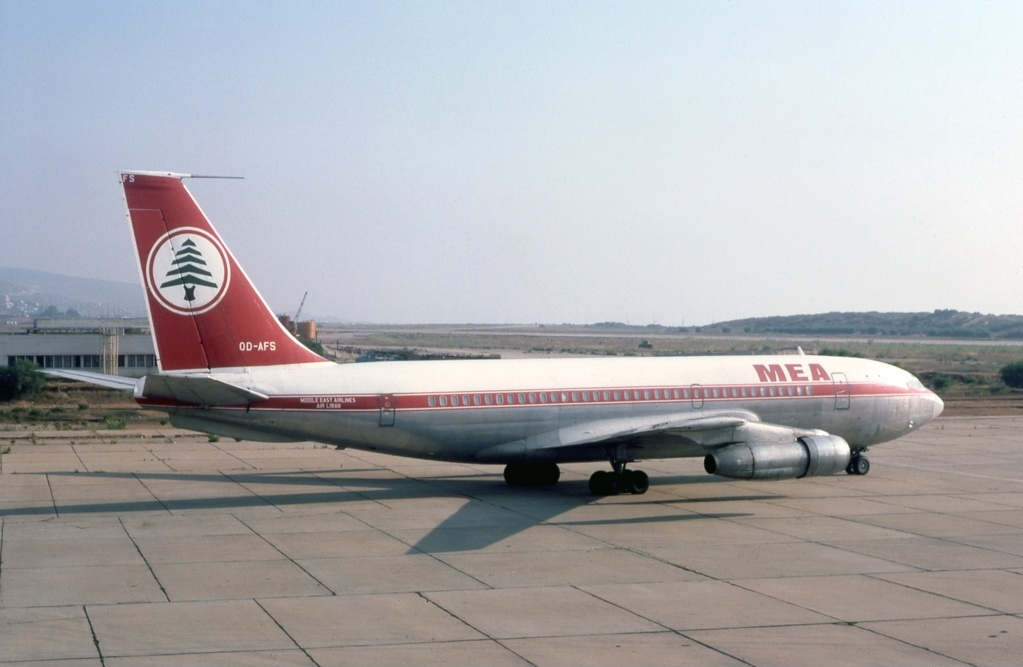
- OD-AFS, a sister ship of the incident aircraft, photographed in July 1977.

Bombing
- Date: 1 January 1976
- Summary: Terrorist bombing
- Site: 37 km (23 mi) NW of Qaisumah, Saudi Arabia

Aircraft
- Aircraft type: Boeing 720-023B
- Operator: Middle East Airlines
- IATA flight No.: ME438
- ICAO flight No.: MEA438
- Call sign: CEDAR JET 438
- Registration: OD-AFT
- Flight origin: Beirut International Airport, Lebanon
- Stopover: Abu Dhabi International Airport, United Arab Emirates
- Destination: Muscat International Airport, Oman
- Occupants: 81
- Passengers: 66
- Crew: 15
- Fatalities: 81
- Survivors: 0

Middle East Airlines Flight 438 was an international passenger flight operated by a Boeing 720 from Beirut, Lebanon, to Muscat, Oman, with a stopover in Abu Dhabi, United Arab Emirates. On 1 January 1976, the aircraft operating the flight was destroyed at 11,300 feet by a bomb, killing all 81 people on board. The bombers were never identified.

== Aircraft ==
The aircraft involved was a Boeing 720-023 that first flew on 23 September 1960. The aircraft was registered as N7534A and was delivered to American Airlines on 10 October. In July 1971, American Airlines sold the aircraft back to lessor. On 3 March 1972, the aircraft was sold to Middle East Airlines where it was re-registered as OD-AFT. The aircraft was powered by four Pratt & Whitney JT3D-1-MC7 turbofan engines with water injection and a thrust of 17,000 pounds-force (76 kN) each.

== Bombing ==
Flight 438 was an international passenger flight from Beirut, Lebanon to Muscat, Oman, with a stopover in Dubai, United Arab Emirates. With 15 crew members and 66 passengers (other sources stated that there were 67 passengers) on board, flight 438 departed from Beirut. In the predawn twilight, the airliner was en route from Beirut to Dubai when at 05:30, 1 hour and 40 minutes after departure, a bomb exploded in the front section of the cargo hold. The aircraft broke up at an altitude of 11,300 metres (37,100 ft) and crashed 37 km (23 mi) northwest of Qaisumah, Saudi Arabia. The crash was the deadliest aviation disaster to occur in Saudi Arabia at the time, and is now the sixth-deadliest. It is also the second-deadliest aviation disaster involving the Boeing 720, behind Pakistan International Airlines Flight 705.

== Investigation ==
According to several reports, the bomb was planted on board by Omani militants. The bomb timer was set so that the bomb would explode after landing at Muscat airport. Killing the passengers was not the goal of the militants. Flight 438 was originally going to be operated by a Boeing 747, but a technical malfunction was discovered, requiring a Boeing 720 to be used instead. Boarding and baggage loading delayed the flight, causing the bomb to explode early while the aircraft was still cruising.
