= Shanghai Y-10 =

Chinese four-engined jet airliner prototype

Y-10
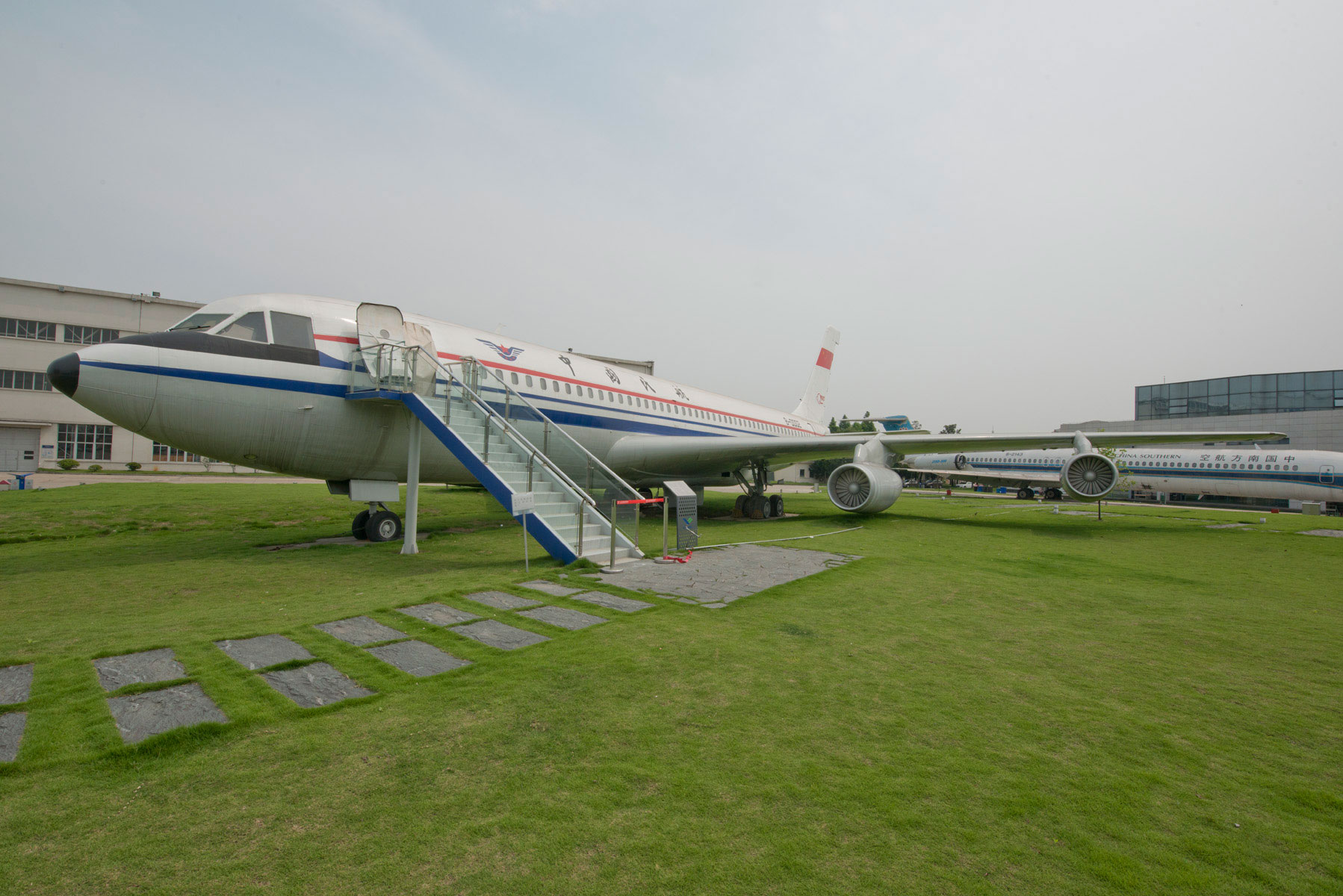

General information
- Type: Narrow-body jet airliner
- Manufacturer: Shanghai Aircraft Manufacturing Factory
- Designer: Shanghai Aircraft Research Institute
- Number built: 3

History
- First flight: 26 September 1980

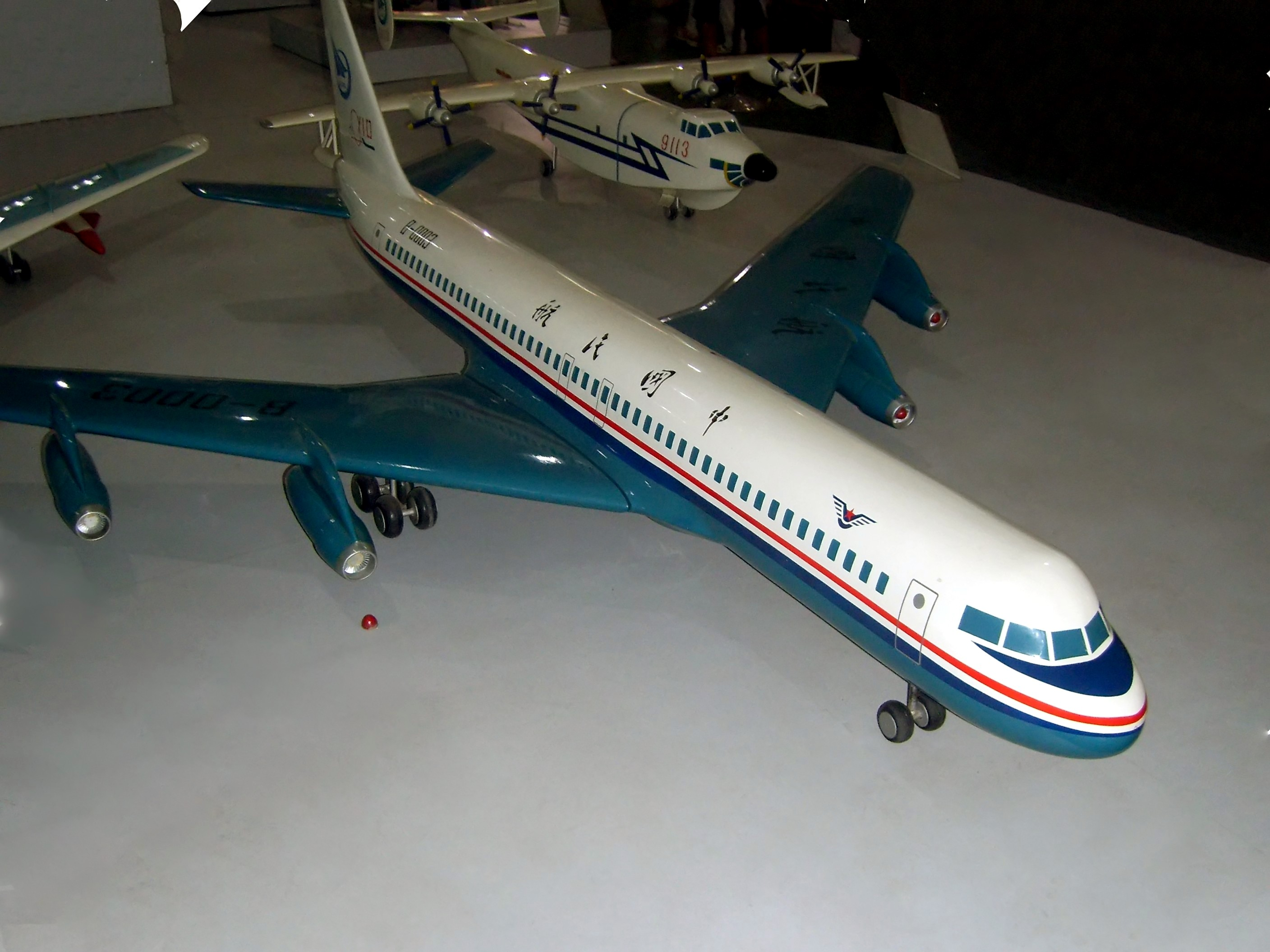
Model

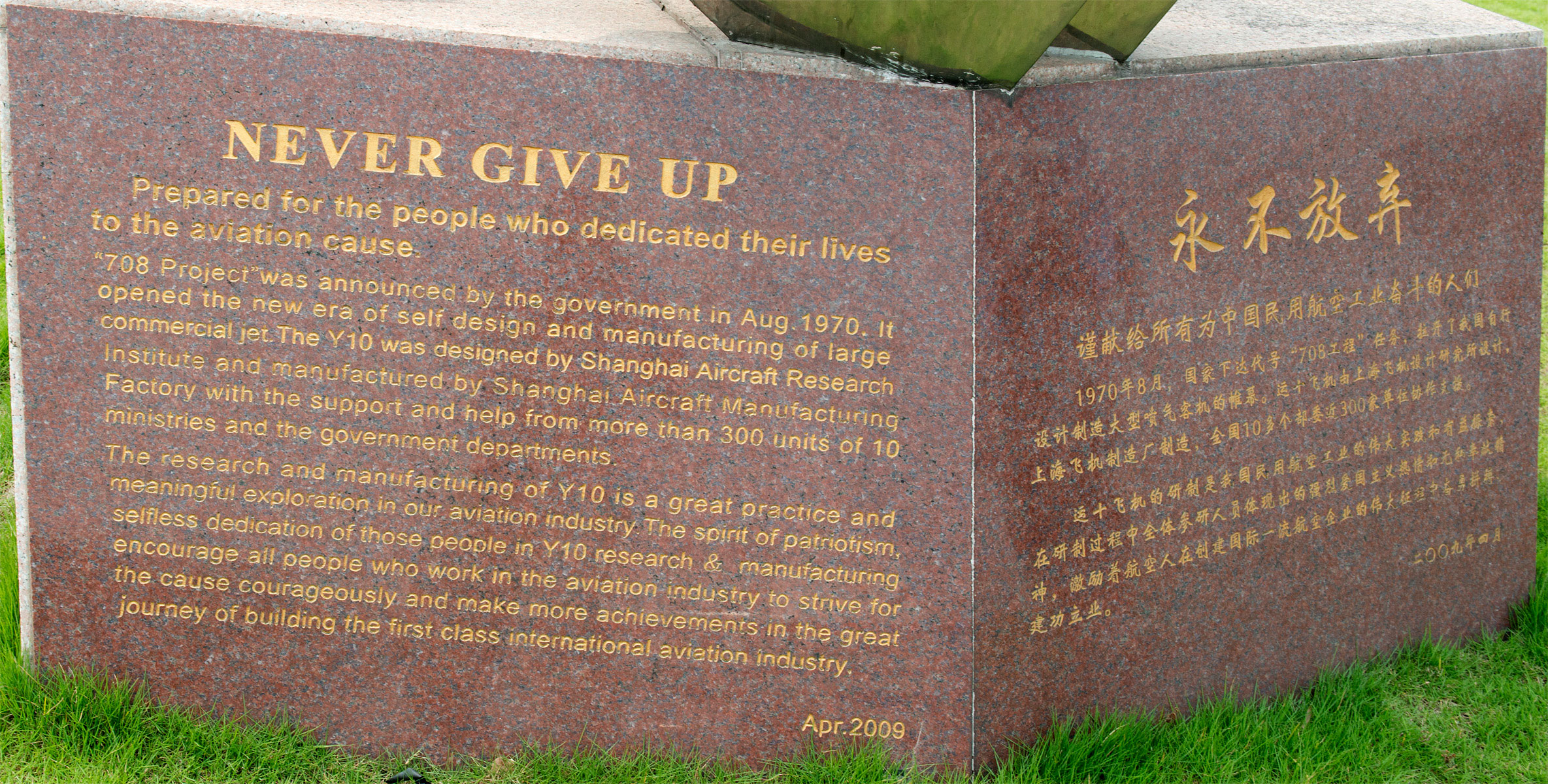
Commemorative plaque

The Shanghai Y-10 or Yun-10 (Chinese: 运-10; lit. 'Transporter-10') is a four engined narrow-body jet airliner developed in the 1970s by the Shanghai Aircraft Research Institute. The plane used Boeing's 707-320C as reference, designed according to Federal Aviation Regulation (Part 25, 1970 edition).

Due to unavailability of the intended WS-8 turbofan engines the prototype aircraft used Pratt & Whitney JT3D-7 turbofan engines, acquired as spare engines for CAAC's small fleet of Boeing 707 aircraft. The cabin could be configured to seat 178 in high-density, 149 in economy, or 124 in mixed-class and the large flight deck accommodated five crew members: pilot, co-pilot, flight engineer, navigator, and radio operator.

== History ==
Development work, given code name 708, began in Shanghai in August, 1970 for Civil Aviation Administration of China (CAAC). The plane was intended to serve as a demonstrator and help the Chinese industry obtain experience in large aircraft design and flight testing. The Y-10 development costs totalled 537.7 million yuan. The Chinese government prided itself on the program, citing a Reuters report which said, "After developing this kind of highly complex technology, one could no longer regard China as a backward country." The project was heavily tainted by politics from the beginning because it was spearheaded by Wang Hongwen, one of the Gang of Four. The guiding philosophy during the 1980s (the political-economic reforms and opening up which emphasizes importing technology from the west and exporting low-end goods) diverted resources from domestic high-tech manufacturing and R&D. The strategic vision of an independently developed large transport plane had long been voiced by Mao Zedong and, in 2006, a similar project with updated design goals made its way into the Eleventh Five-Year Plan, periodic strategic socio-economical development plans drawn up by the Chinese government.

Three aircraft were built by the Shanghai Aircraft Manufacturing Factory (now known as Shanghai Aircraft Manufacturing Company) at Dachang Air Base north of Shanghai. The first prototype (01) was used for static testing, the second prototype (02) was used for flight testing and the third (03) for fatigue testing. The plane first flew on September 26, 1980, making 130 flights with 170 hours of flying time, visiting Beijing, Harbin, Urumqi, Zhengzhou, Hefei, Guangzhou, Kunming, Lhasa and Chengdu before its retirement in 1984.

The Y-10 is an indigenous Chinese design. In 1970, the factory acquired a Pakistan Boeing 707 that crashed in Hetian, Xinjiang to study it. While the planes were reverse-engineered copies of the Boeing 707—one report claimed that after Chinese engineers disassembled a 707 to study it, neither the reassembled original nor the copy would fly—both the Y-10's designers and Boeing denied this. While the Y-10 resembles the 707, its dimensions are closer to the Boeing 720 than the 707, and the internal design is very different.

By the time the prototype was first flown, debate about its viability surfaced, based on a design that was already 30 years old. CAAC, which already owned a modest Western fleet, would not purchase the plane. China was beginning to embrace trade with the West, and some saw the isolationist design as an inefficient throwback to Maoism. China in the early reform era was ruled by rehabilitated cadres previously persecuted in the Cultural Revolution by Wang Hongwen, the project initiator, resulting in the cancellation of the project in 1983, officially due to cost and market concerns. During its maiden flights, no governmental officials attended the ceremonies for fear of the connection to Wang Hongwen and the Gang of Four. By 1985, Shanghai Aircraft Manufacturing Factory had been granted production licensing for the McDonnell Douglas MD-80 and shifted all efforts towards that program.

A model of an AWACS variant has been seen, resembling the Boeing E-3 Sentry AWACS aircraft.

Panels

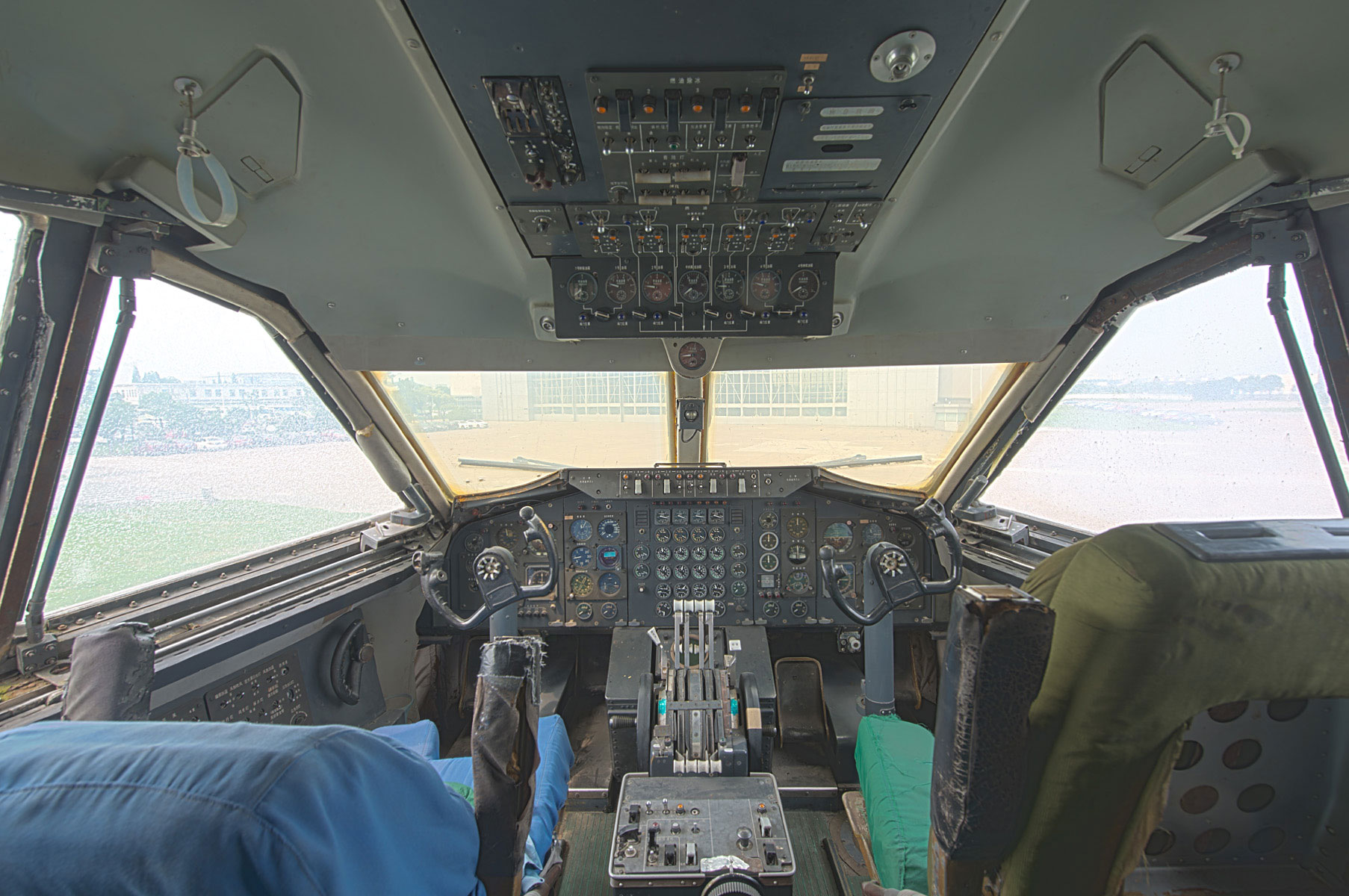
Cockpit

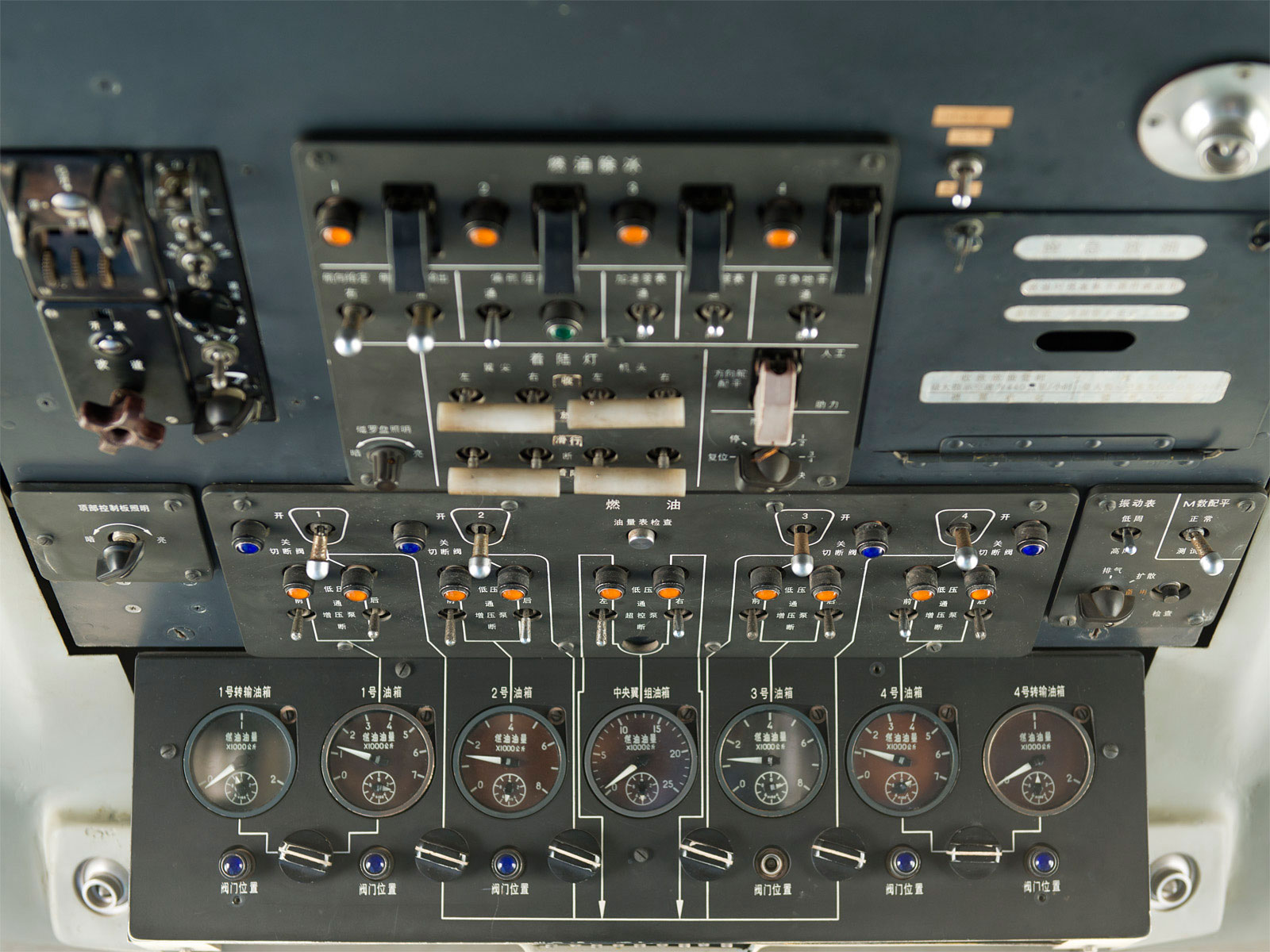
Overhead

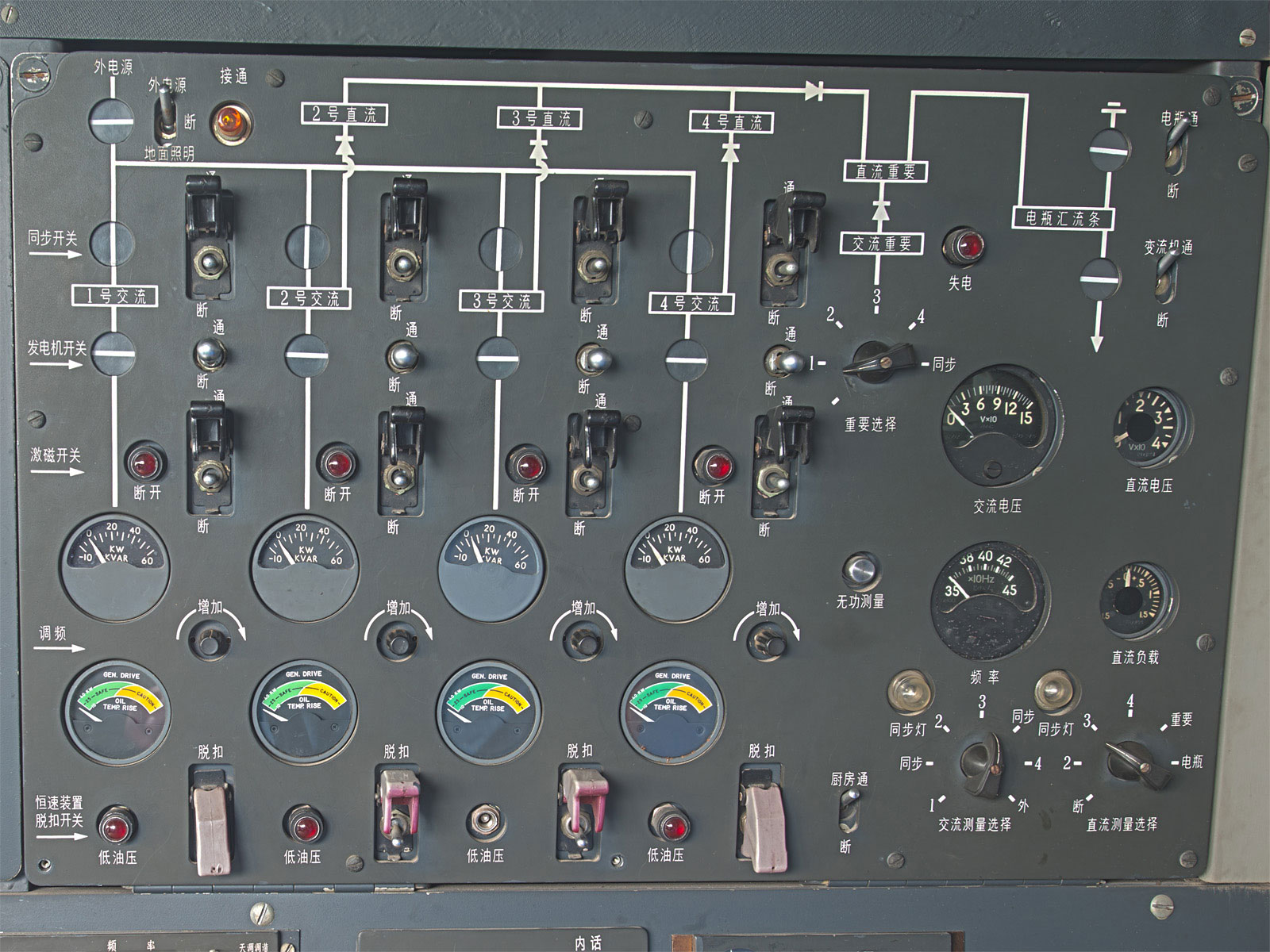
Flight engineer's station

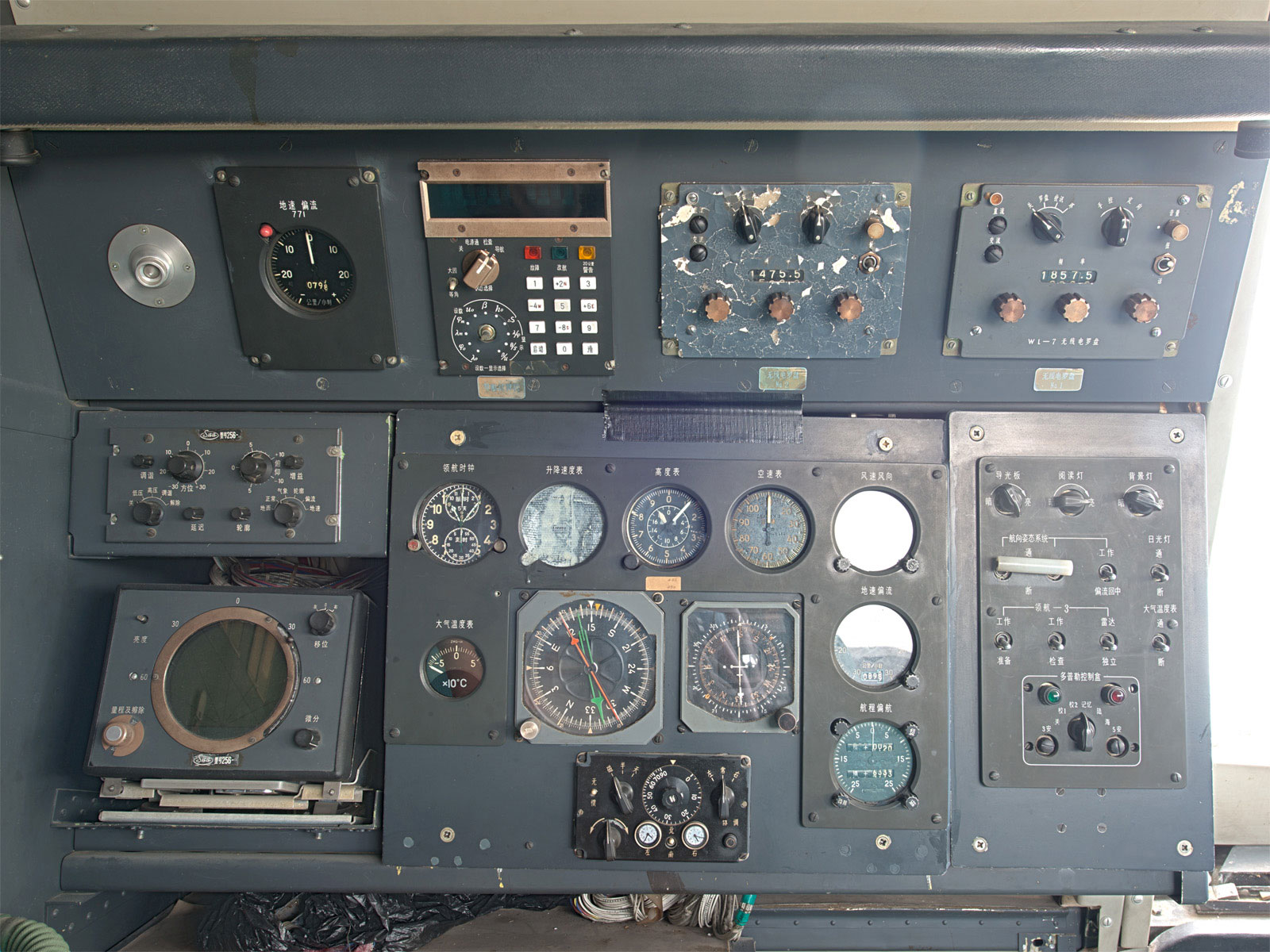
Navigator's station

== Specifications (Y-10) ==
Data from Chinese Aircraft:China's aviation industry since 1951

General characteristics

- Crew: 5 (pilot, co-pilot, flight engineer, navigator, radio operator)
- Passenger capacity:
  - High density: 178
  - All economy: 149
  - Mixed class: 124
- Max payload: 16,700 kg (36,817 lb)
- Length: 42.93 m (140 ft 10 in)
- Wingspan: 42.24 m (138 ft 7 in)
- Height: 13.42 m (44 ft 0 in)
- Wing area: 244.5 m^{2} (2,632 sq ft)
- Empty weight: 58,120 kg (128,133 lb)
- Max takeoff weight: 102,000 kg (224,872 lb) (Some sources quote 110,227 kg (243,009 lb))
- Fuel capacity: 51,000 kg (112,436 lb)
- Powerplant: 4 × Pratt & Whitney JT3D-3B turbofan engines, 84.7 kN (19,000 lbf) thrust each

Performance

- Maximum speed: 974 km/h (605 mph, 526 kn)
- Max Cruise Speed: 917 km/h (570 mph; 495 kn)
  - Economical Cruise Speed: 830–850 km/h (520–530 mph; 450–460 kn)
- Landing speed: 250 km/h (160 mph; 130 kn)
- Range:
  - Max payload: 5,560 km (3,450 mi; 3,000 nmi)
  - Max fuel: 8,000 km (5,000 mi; 4,300 nmi)
- Service ceiling: 12,330 m (40,450 ft)
- Thrust/weight: 0.313

== See also ==
- COMAC C919
- COMAC C909

Aircraft of comparable role, configuration, and era

- Convair 880
- Convair 990 Coronado
- Douglas DC-8
- Boeing 707
- Boeing 720
- Ilyushin Il-62
- Vickers VC10

Related lists

- List of jet airliners
