= Boeing 720 =

1959 American four-engined jet airliner series

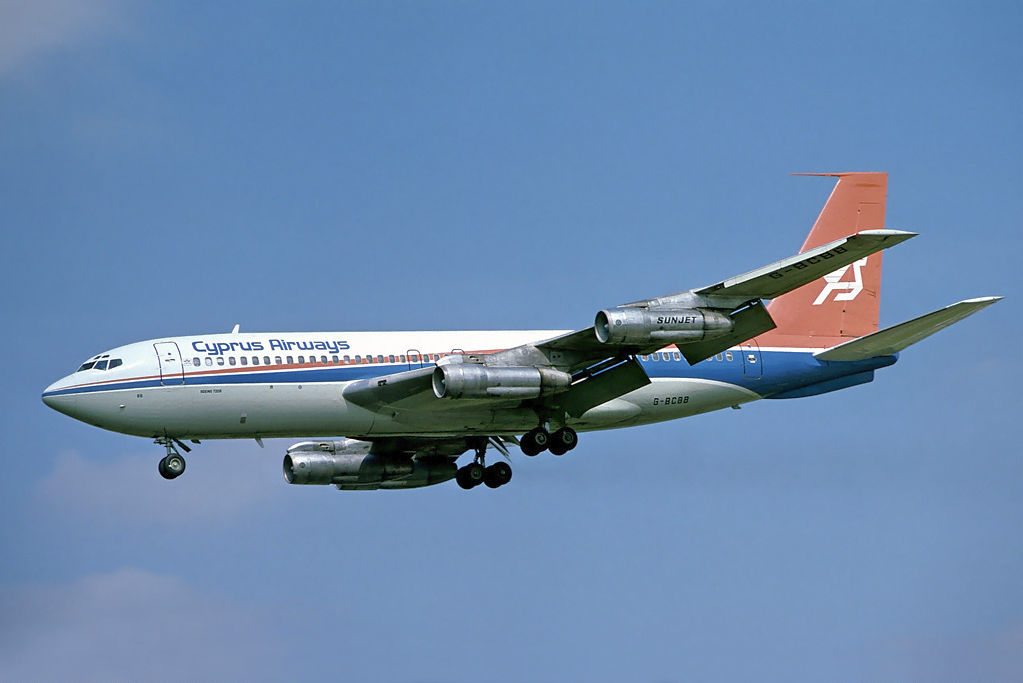
- The 720 is similar to the Boeing 707 with a slightly shorter fuselage

General information
- Role: Narrow-body jet airliner
- National origin: United States
- Manufacturer: Boeing Commercial Airplanes
- Status: Retired
- Primary users: United Airlines: Western Airlines; Eastern Air Lines; Northwest Airlines
- Number built: 154

History
- Manufactured: 1959–1967
- Introduction date: July 5, 1960, with United Airlines
- First flight: November 23, 1959
- Retired: September 29, 2010
- Developed from: Boeing 707

The Boeing 720 is a retired American narrow-body airliner produced by Boeing Commercial Airplanes. Announced in July 1957 as a 707 derivative for shorter flights from shorter runways, the 720 first flew on November 23, 1959. Its type certificate was issued on June 30, 1960, and it entered service with United Airlines on July 5, 1960. A total of 154 Boeing 720s and 720Bs were built; production ended in 1967. As a derivative, the 720 had low development costs, allowing profitability despite relatively few sales.

The 720 is 8.33 feet (2.54 m) shorter than a 707-120, has a modified wing, and a lightened airframe for a lower maximum takeoff weight. Originally designed to be powered by four Pratt & Whitney JT3C turbojets, the initial 720 could cover a 2,800-nautical-mile [nmi] (5,200 km; 3,200 mi) range with 131 passengers in two classes. The reconfigured 720B, powered by JT3D turbofans, first flew on October 6, 1960, and entered service in March 1961. It could seat 156 passengers in one class over a 3,200-nautical-mile [nmi] (5,900 km; 3,700 mi) range. Some 720s were later converted to the 720B specification. It was succeeded by the Boeing 727 trijet.

== Development ==
=== Shorter range 707 ===
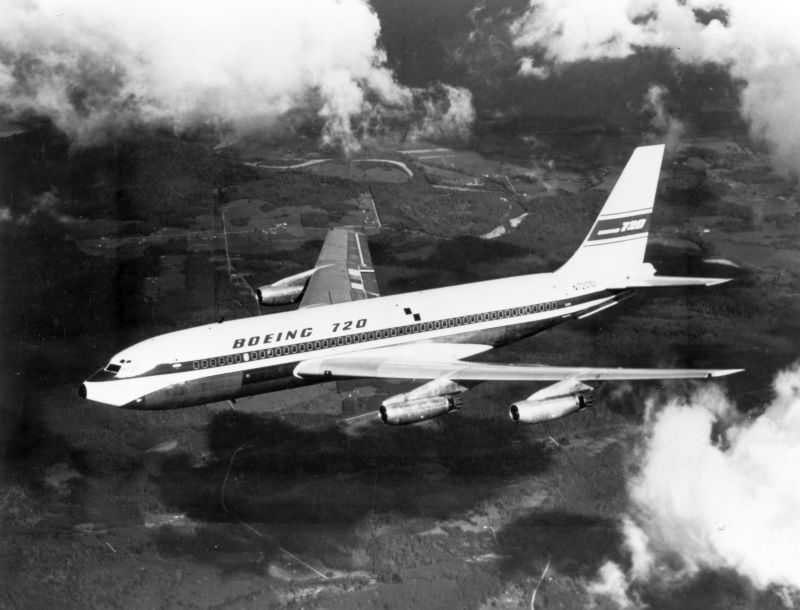
The Boeing 720 made its maiden flight on November 23, 1959.

Boeing announced its plans to develop a new version of the 707 in July 1957. It was developed from the 707-120 to provide for short- to medium-range flights from shorter runways. The model was originally designated 707-020 before being changed to 720 at the input of United Airlines. It has four fewer frames than a 707-120 in front of the wing and one fewer aft, with a total length reduction of 8 feet 4 inches (2.54 m).

The new model was designed to a lower maximum takeoff weight with a modified wing and a lightened airframe. The wing modifications included Krueger flaps outboard of the outboard engines, lowering take-off and landing speeds—thus shortening runway length requirements. A thickened inboard leading edge section with a slightly greater sweep increased top speed over the 707-120. It had four Pratt & Whitney JT3C-7 turbojet engines producing 12,500 lbf (55.6 kN) each.

At one point in the development phase, it was known as the 707-020, then 717-020, although this was the Boeing model designation of the KC-135 and remained unused for a commercial airliner until it was applied to the MD-95, following Boeing's merger with McDonnell Douglas in 1997.

Because the aircraft systems were similar to the Boeing 707, no prototype Boeing 720 was built; any different systems were tested on the Boeing 367-80. The first 720 took its maiden flight on November 23, 1959. The type certificate for the 720 was issued on June 30, 1960. It entered service with United Airlines on July 5, 1960; 65 of the original version were built.

=== Further developments ===
The 720B version of the 720 had JT3D turbofan engines, producing 17,000 lbf (75.6 kN) each. The JT3D engines had lower fuel consumption and higher thrust. The maximum takeoff weight for the 720B was increased to 234,000 lb (106,000 kg). The 720B first took to the skies on October 6, 1960, and received certification and entered service with American Airlines in March 1961; 89 720Bs were built, in addition to conversions of American's 10 existing 720s.

As a modification of an existing model, the 720 had minimal research and development costs, which allowed it to be successful despite few sales. The company built 154 Boeing 720s and 720Bs from 1959 to 1967. The 720's wing modification was later added on the 707-120B and on 707-120s retrofitted to the B standard.

== Design ==
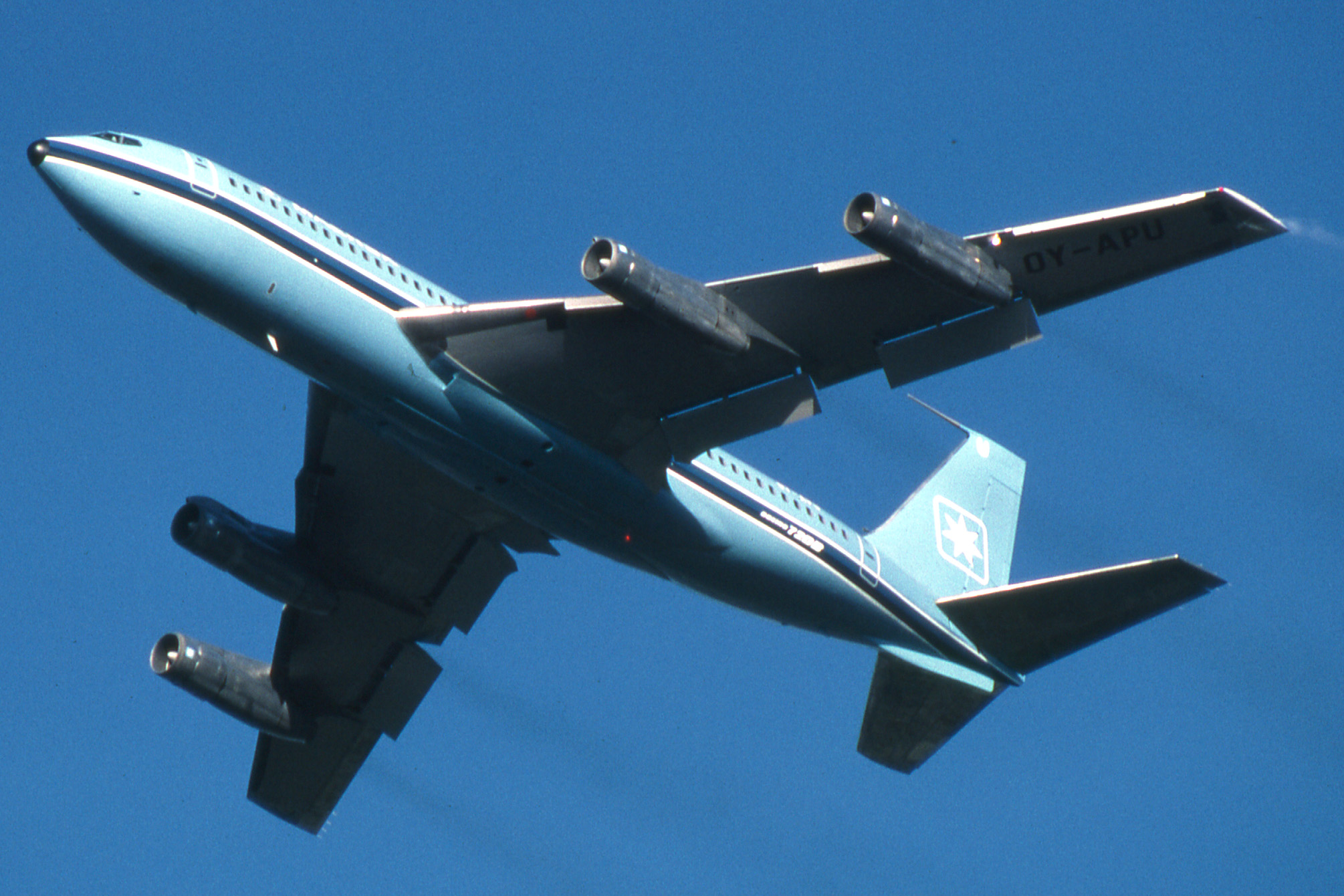
The 720 is slightly shorter than the 707 and has a modified wing.

The Boeing 720 is a four-engined low-wing cantilever monoplane. Although it was similar to the Boeing 707, compared with the 707-120, it was 8 ft 4 in (2.54 m) shorter in length, and had a lighter structure through use of lighter forged metal parts and thinner fuselage skins and structures.

=== Fuselage ===
The rearmost of the 707's over-wing emergency exits was deleted on each side, which reduced passenger capacity, while two over-wing exits were an option for higher-density configurations.

=== Wings ===
The 720 uses an improved wing based on the 707 wing. The wingspan remained the same as the 707-120. For the 720, the wing was changed between the fuselage and inner engines by adding a wing root glove. This glove reduced the drag of the wing by decambering the root, which reduced the "middle effect", thereby increasing the effective local wing sweep. The wing root glove reportedly increased the drag divergence Mach number of the wing by Mach 0.02.

=== Engines ===
Though initially fitted with turbojet engines, the dominant engine for the Boeing 720 was the Pratt & Whitney JT3D, a turbofan variant of the JT3C with lower fuel consumption and higher thrust. JT3D-engined 720s had a "B" suffix; some of American's 720Bs were conversions of JT3C-powered 720s.

Like the 707, the 720/720B used engine-driven turbocompressors to supply high-pressure air for cabin pressurization. The engines could not supply sufficient bleed air for this purpose without a serious loss of thrust. The small air inlets and associated humps are visible just above the main engine inlets on the two inner engine pods of all 720s and 720Bs; the lack of the turbocompressor inlet on the outer starboard pod (number 4 engine) helps spotters distinguish 720/720Bs from most 707s, which had three turbocompressors.

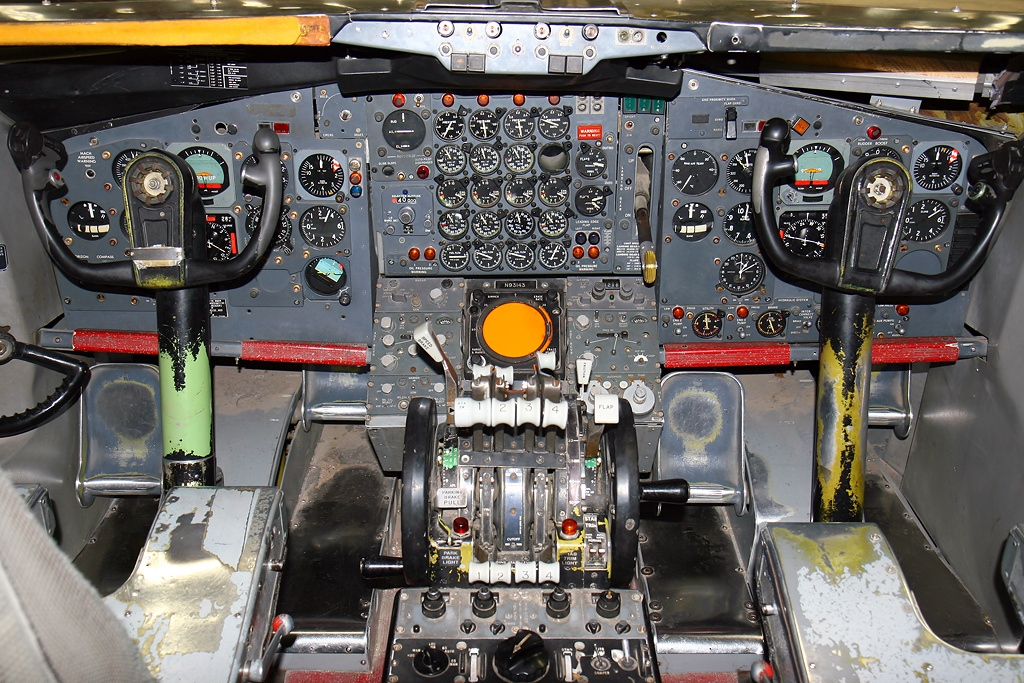
The Boeing 720 flight deck.

=== Other equipment ===
The Boeing 720 lacked an auxiliary power unit, and relied instead on ground power and pneumatic air to power the aircraft's systems, provide air conditioning, and start the engines while on the ground. The normal practice for Boeing 720 aircraft was to start the number three (inner starboard) engine first, then disconnect ground power and air. With one engine running, bleed air from that engine could be used to provide necessary air pressure to start the other engines one by one. On the ground, with the ground starting crew at hand, all four engines were usually started with ground crew help: this was more reliable and faster.

== Operational history ==
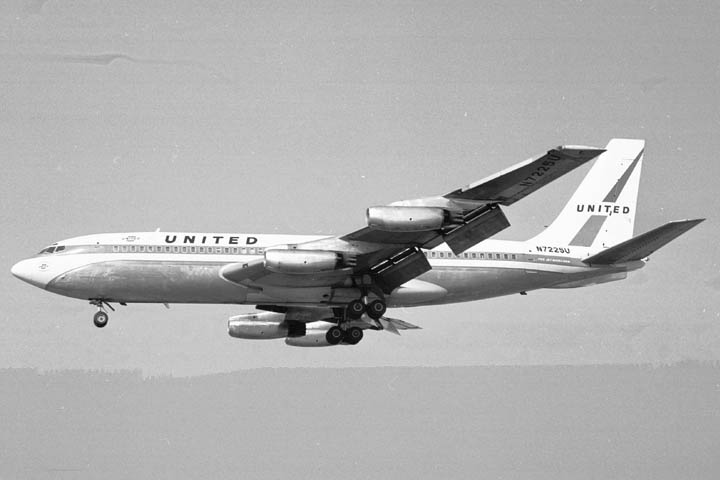
United Airlines introduced the 720 on July 5, 1960.

The first aircraft was a production aircraft for United Airlines which flew on November 23, 1959. The type certificate for the 720 was issued on June 30, 1960. The first service of the 720 was by United Airlines on July 5, 1960 on the Los Angeles-Denver-Chicago route. American Airlines followed by putting the 720 in commercial operation on July 31 that same year. On January 2, 1962, Pakistan International Airlines′ first Boeing 720B – a Boeing 720-040B (registration AP-AMG) piloted by Captain Abdullah Baig and copilot Captain Taimur Baig – set a world record during the London-to-Karachi leg of its delivery flight to Pakistan for speed over a commercial air route, making the flight in 6 hours 43 minutes 55 seconds at an average speed of 938.78 km/h (583.33 mph).

The 720 was supplanted by the Boeing 727 in the mid-1960s in its medium-range, high-performance market. In the late 1960s, 720 and 720B aircraft were used by the US military to shuttle troops to the Far-East war efforts. The interiors of these planes were stripped of class partitions. Some of these flights originated at Travis AFB California and flew nonstop to Japan. At least one of the landing sites was Yokota AB, Japan, before the troops traveled to their final destinations.

After disposal of 720s by the major airlines, many were acquired by second-rank operators in South America and elsewhere.

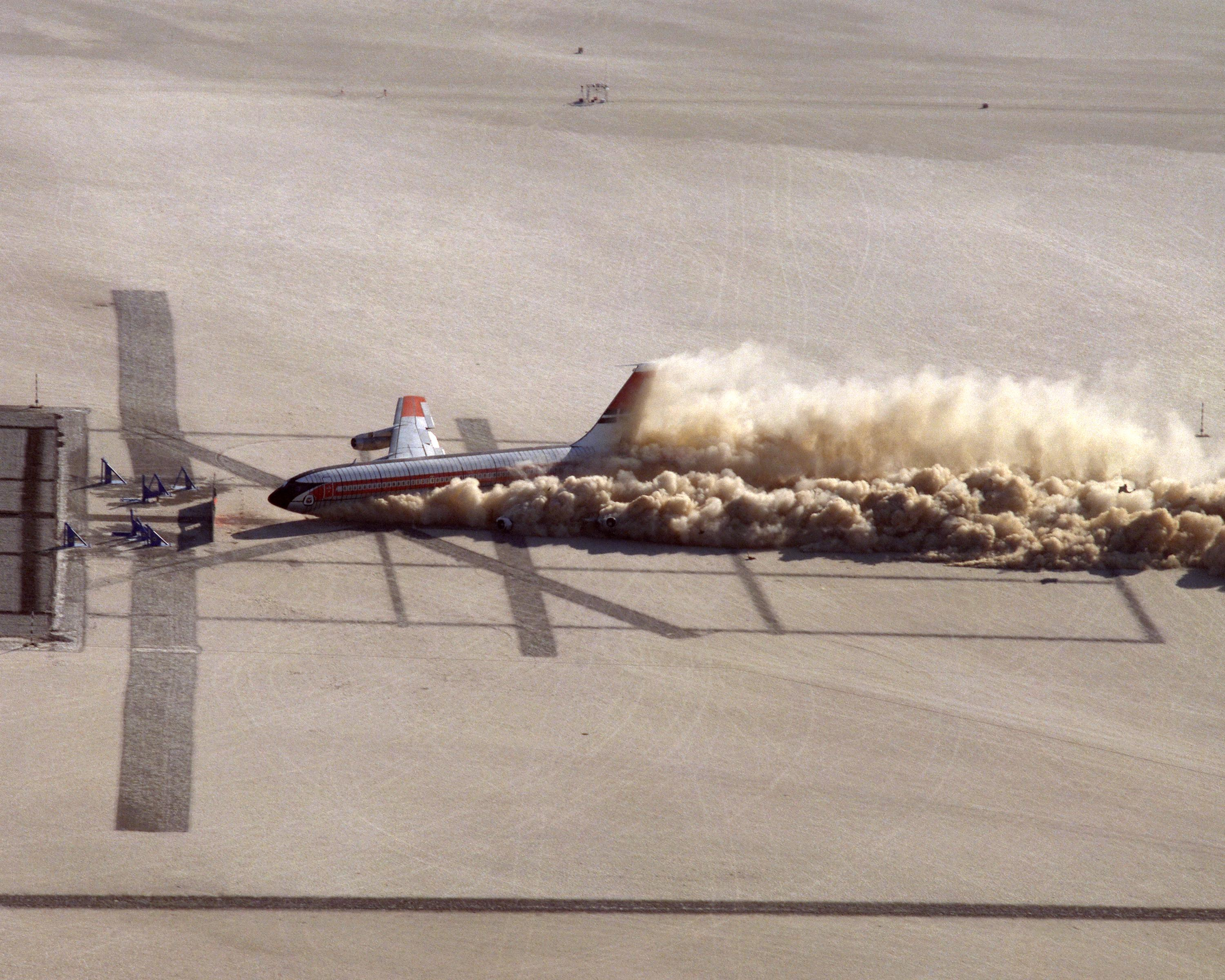
The Controlled Impact Demonstration used an FAA 720.

In 1984, a Boeing 720 flown by remote control was intentionally crashed at Edwards AFB as a part of the FAA and NASA Controlled Impact Demonstration program. The test provided peak accelerations during a crash. The performance of fire-retardant fuel was also tested.

The first 720 (N7201U) was later renamed "The Starship" and became a private charter jet used mainly by touring rock bands. Its main user was Led Zeppelin in the 1970s. The seating capacity was reduced and a bar with a built-in electric organ was added, along with beds, a shower, a lounge area, a TV, and video cassette player.

Honeywell operated the last Boeing 720 in the United States, flying out of Sky Harbor Airport in Phoenix. The aircraft had been modified with an extra engine nacelle mounted on the right side of the fuselage to allow testing of a turbine engine at altitude, operating on special certification allowing it to be used for experimental use. This 720B was scrapped on June 21 and 22, 2008. Honeywell replaced their aircraft with a Boeing 757.

Pratt & Whitney Canada (PWC) operated the last flying 720 (C-FETB) until 2010. C-FETB was built as N7538A in 1960 and was initially flown by American Airlines and later by Middle East Airlines as OD-AFQ. It was purchased by PWC in December 1985 and between October 1986 and January 1988 it was modified for use as a flying engine test bed. Internally it was known as FTB1 (Flying Test Bed 1). C-FETB was used to test a variety of engines with it being capable of carrying a large turbofan in place of the right wing's inner engine. Alongside this a small turbofan could be mounted on the right side of the front fuselage while a turboprop could be mounted in the modified nose. Its final operational flight occurred on September 29, 2010. Pratt & Whitney Canada replaced the testbed with a Boeing 747SP. In May 2012, the former PWC 720 was flown to CFB Trenton, Ontario, to be put on display at the National Air Force Museum of Canada.

== Variants ==
720
First production variant with four Pratt & Whitney JT3C turbojet engines
Several high-density seat configurations delivered to Eastern Airlines included four over-wing escape hatches and brake cooling fans to effect quick turns on short-haul sectors. These aircraft, designated "720-025", were certificated to carry up to 170 passengers, provided that certain safety requirements were met.

720B
Improved variant with four Pratt & Whitney JT3D turbofan engines; American Airlines converted its 720s to 720B standard.

== Operators ==
The Boeing 720 was operated/leased by 57 different airlines. These operators flew Boeing 720/720Bs (● = Original Operators):

Afghanistan

- Ariana Afghan Airlines 1 x 720B from 1973 and additional 720B was leased.

Belize

- Belize Airways 5 x 720B, used from 1976 to 1980.

Cambodia

- Air Cambodge 1 x 720 in 1972–72.

Ceylon

- Air Ceylon 1 x 720, 1 x 720B leased in 1970s.

Colombia

- Aerocondor Colombia 2 x 720B, used from 1972 to 1980
- Aerotal 1 x 720B leased.
- Avianca ● 4 x 720B, two delivered in 1961, one in 1965 and one in 1969
- SAM Colombia 3 x 720B used from 1977 to 1980

Democratic Republic of the Congo

- Air Charter Service 3 x 720.

Denmark

- Conair of Scandinavia 5 x 720-051B and 5 x 720-025 from 1971 till 1987.
- Maersk Air 5 x 720-051B from 1973 till 1987.

Dominican Republic

- Aeromar 2 x 720 leased from 1979.
- Aerotours Dominicano 1 x 720 leased.
- Aerovias Quisqueyana 1 x 720 leased.
- Agro Air International Dominicana 2 x 720 from 1977.

Ecuador

- Ecuatoriana de Aviacion 720B

Ethiopia

- Ethiopian Airlines ● 3 x 720Bs, two delivered in 1962 and one in 1965

France

- Air Inter 1 x 720 leased.

Germany

- Lufthansa ● 8 x 720B delivered 1961–1962

Greece

- Olympic Airways 7 x 720B delivered 1972–1973

Iceland

- Air Viking 3 x 720
- Eagle Air (Iceland) - 720B

India

- Air India 1 x 720 freighter leased in 1978.

Indonesia

- Air Bali 1 x 720 leased in 1975 but airline failed to gain approval for charter flights to the United States.

Ireland

- Aer Lingus ● 3 x 720 delivered 1960–1961

Israel

- El Al ● 2 x 720B delivered in 1962
- MAOF airlines 2 x 720B bought from Monarch in 1981

Jordan

- Alia - Royal Jordanian Airlines 2 x 720B

Kenya

- Kenya Airways 720B

Lebanon

- Middle East Airlines 720B

Malta

- Air Malta 5 x 720B used from 1974 to 1988

Nicaragua

- Aeronica 1 x 720B used from 1982 to 1989

Norway

- Trans Polar 3 x 720

Pakistan

- Pakistan International Airlines ● 4 x 720B delivered 1961–1962 and one in 1965

Papua New Guinea

- Air Niugini 1 x 720B leased from 1976.

Rhodesia

- Air Rhodesia 3 x 720 acquired 1973

Saudi Arabia

- Saudi Arabian Airlines ● 2 x 720B delivered in 1961

Tanzania

- Air Tanzania 2 x 720 leased.

United Kingdom

- Invicta International Airlines 1 720-023B.
- Monarch Airlines 5 x 720-051B and 2 x 720-023B.

United States

- Aeroamerica 6 x 720
- AirClub International
- Alaska Airlines operated both the 720 and the 720B but did not take delivery of either type new.
- Ambassadair
- American Airlines ● 10 x 720 delivered in 1960 and 15 x 720Bs delivered in 1961, the ten 720s were converted to turbofan powered B models in 1961
- American Trans Air 2 x 720, 1 x 720B
- Atlanta Skylarks
- Braniff International Airways ● 5 x 720 delivered 1961–1963, an additional aircraft was sold to the Federal Aviation Agency before delivery
- Capital Airlines leased 720s from United Airlines.
- Continental Airlines ● 8 x 720B delivered 1962–1966
- Eastern Air Lines ● 15 x 720 delivered 1961–1962
- Federal Aviation Agency one 720 delivered in 1960 or 1961
- Independent Air
- Northwest Airlines ● 13 x 720B delivered 1961–1964
- Pacific Northern Airlines ● 2 x 720 delivered in 1962, 1 x 720 acquired from Braniff International
- Pan American World Airways 9 x 720B used from 1963-1974 for Caribbean and South American operations.
- Southeast Airlines 1 x 720
- Trans World Airlines ● 4 x 720B leased in 1961.
- United Airlines ● 29 x 720 delivered 1960–1962
- Voyager 1000
- Western Airlines ● 27 x 720Bs delivered 1961–1967

Yemen

- Alyemda 2 x 720B

== Accidents and incidents ==
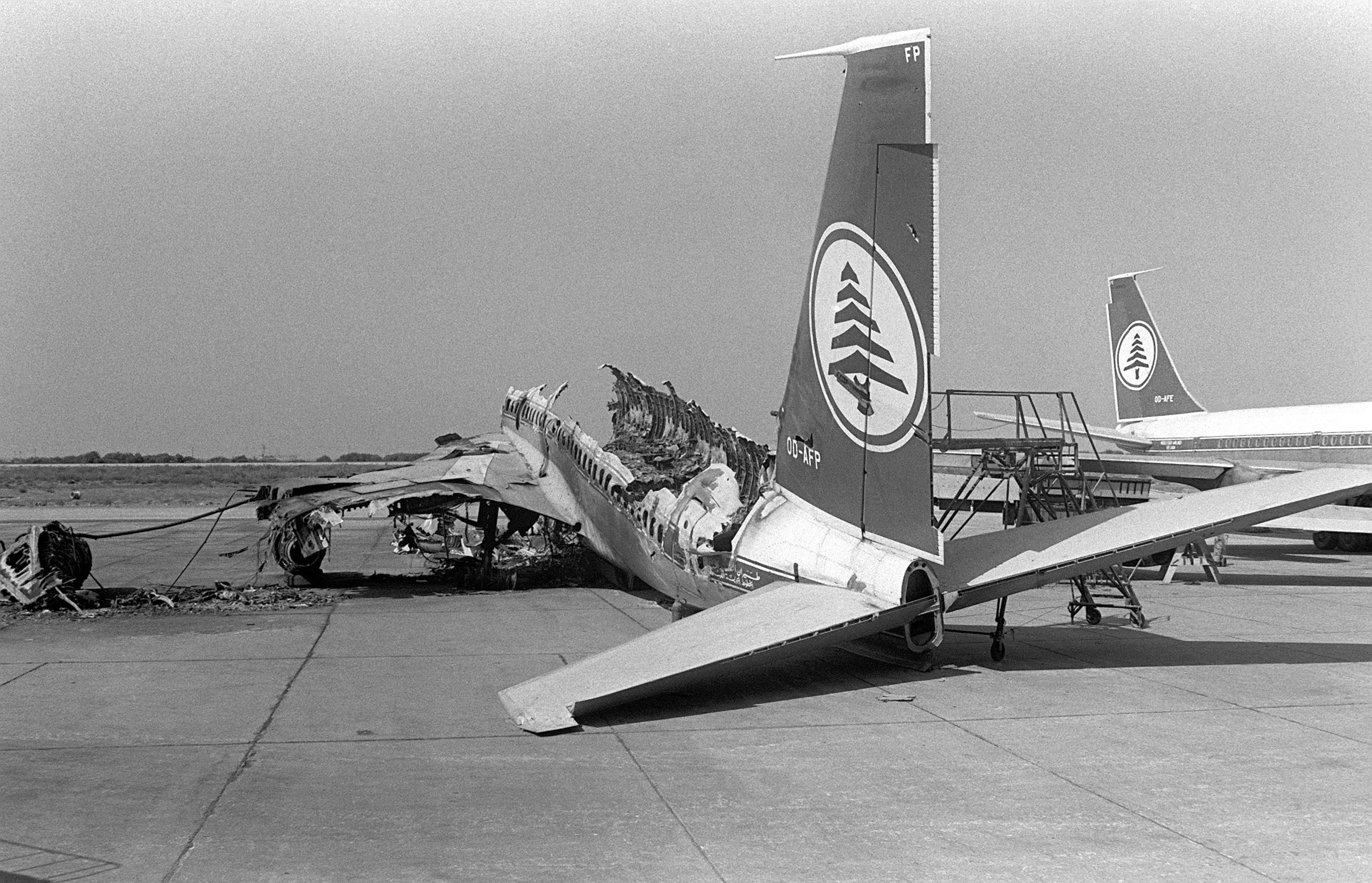
A Middle East Airlines 720 destroyed during Operation Peace for Galilee.

The Boeing 720 has had 23 hull-loss accidents during its career; it was also involved in a number of incidents including nine hijack incidents and one aircraft destroyed by a bomb in mid-air in 1976. Only 12 of the hull-loss accidents included fatalities which totaled 175 deaths in addition to the 81 deaths on the aircraft destroyed in mid-air by a bomb.

The worst of these accidents were:

- On February 12, 1963, Northwest Orient Airlines Flight 705, a Boeing 720-051B (reg. N724US), suffered an in-flight break-up over the Florida Everglades about 12 minutes after leaving Miami, bound for Chicago. All 35 passengers and eight crew died. The cause of the crash was determined to be an unrecoverable loss of control due to severe turbulence.
- On May 20, 1965, Pakistan International Airlines Flight 705, a Boeing 720-040B (reg AP-AMH), crashed short of the runway at Cairo International Airport, killing 121 of the 127 people on board.
- On December 8, 1972, seven members of the Eritrean Liberation Front hijacked Ethiopian Airlines Flight 708, a Boeing 720-060B, on its way to Paris. Security forces on the plane immediately opened fire, killing all but one of the hijackers (the last surviving hijacker later died in hospital). During the altercation, a hand grenade was detonated that damaged control cables under the cabin floor. However, the pilot put the plane into a controlled dive and managed to land the plane safely back in Addis Ababa with no further casualties.
- On January 1, 1976, Middle East Airlines Flight 438, a Boeing 720-023B (reg. OD-AFT), was destroyed en route from Beirut to Dubai by a bomb in the forward cargo hold. All 66 passengers and 15 crew were killed.

== Aircraft on display ==
- 720-051B 18351 "Chung Mei", a former Republic of China Air Force VIP aircraft, is on display at Kangshan, Taiwan.
- 720-023B 4X-JYG (military serial number 010): a former Israeli Air Force special radar testbed for the IAI Lavi fighter. The aircraft is currently stored in a non-public area at the Israeli Air Force Museum near Hatzerim.
- 720-047B N110DS: a former Western Airlines aircraft, with most of the airframe scrapped in 1989. Its forward cockpit section was preserved and is currently on display in the indoor exhibit at the Pima Air & Space Museum in Tucson, Arizona, where it has been converted into an interactive children's flight simulator.
- 720-047B AP-AXL is on display at PIA Planetarium, Lahore (Pakistan) standing in a park for the public.
- 720-047B AP-AXM is on display at PIA Planetarium, Karachi (Pakistan).
- 720-023B C-FETB was donated to the National Air Force Museum of Canada in 2012 after its last flight.
- 720-030B HK-749 is on display at Museo de los Niños (Children's Museum of Bogotá), Bogotá, Colombia in Avianca Colombia livery. It was the first jet airplane delivered to a Colombian airline.
- 720-023B VT-ERS: a former Samrat Holdings aircraft. In July 1991, it made an emergency landing at Nagpur Airport, India due to engine trouble. It was subsequently abandoned on the airport tarmac for decades due to legal and parking fee disputes, and although largely intact, the airframe remains severely deteriorated.

== Specifications (Boeing 720-048) ==
Diagram of Boeing 720.

Data from

General characteristics

- Crew: 3
- Capacity: 131–137 passengers in two classes, 156 in one class
- Length: 136 ft 2 in (41.50 m)
- Wingspan: 130 ft 10 in (39.88 m)
- Width: 12 ft 4 in (3.76 m) (fuselage)
- Height: 41 ft 5 in (12.62 m)
- Empty weight: 110,800 lb (50,258 kg)
- Gross weight: 230,000 lb (104,326 kg)
- Max takeoff weight: 229,300 lb (104,009 kg)
- Fuel capacity: 16,060 US gal (13,370 imp gal; 60,800 L) or 2,150 cu ft (61 m^{3})
- Powerplant: 4 × Pratt & Whitney JT3C-7 turbojet engine, 12,000 lbf (53 kN) thrust each

Performance

- Maximum speed: 460 mph (740 km/h, 399 kn) at 23,400 ft (7,100 m)
- Maximum speed: Mach 0.906
- Minimum control speed: 115 mph (185 km/h, 100 kn)
- Range: 3,200 mi (5,200 km, 2,800 nmi) with 131 passengers
- Service ceiling: 42,000 ft (13,000 m)
- Takeoff distance: 9,000 ft (2,700 m)
- Landing distance: 6,200 ft (1,900 m)

== See also ==
Related development

- Boeing 367-80
- Boeing 707
- Boeing C-135 Stratolifter
- Boeing KC-135 Stratotanker

Aircraft of comparable role, configuration, and era

- Convair 880
- Convair 990
- Shanghai Y-10

Related lists

- List of jet airliners
- List of airliners
- List of Boeing customers
