= Aeroamerica =

American charter airline (1973–1982)

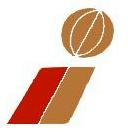
IATA	ICAO	Call sign
EO^{(1)}	EO^{(1)}	AEROAMERICA
- Founded: 1973
- Ceased operations: 1982
- Operating bases: Seattle Boeing Field, Berlin-Tegel Airport Portland, Oregon, Boston Logan
- Fleet size: 18 aircraft (9 Boeing 707, 8 Boeing 720, 1 Rockwell Aero Commander (as of April 1979))
- Headquarters: Seattle Boeing Field
- Key people: Alex Harris, Richard C. Neese, Richard Heaton, Capt Rondo(Pete) Pietscher
- Founder: A. Joël Eisenberg

Notes
- (1) IATA, ICAO codes were the same until the 1980s

AirClub International Club International
- Founded: February 1971, incorporated in Oregon
- Commenced operations: May 1971
- Ceased operations: June 1975
- Fleet size: 3 aircraft (1 Boeing 707, 1 Boeing 720, 1 Douglas DC-7)
- Headquarters: Seattle Boeing Field
- Founder: A. Joël Eisenberg

Aeroamerica, Inc. was founded as an uncertificated carrier, also known as a commercial operator. It was headquartered at Seattle Boeing Field, Washington. In 1975 the airline established an overseas base at Tegel Airport in what used to be West Berlin prior to German reunification. Berlin Tegel was the main operating base from 1975 until 1979. Aeroamerica ceased operations in 1982. The airline had its origins in air travel club AirClub International (originally Club International), which was shut down by the US government in 1974.

== History ==
=== AirClub International ===
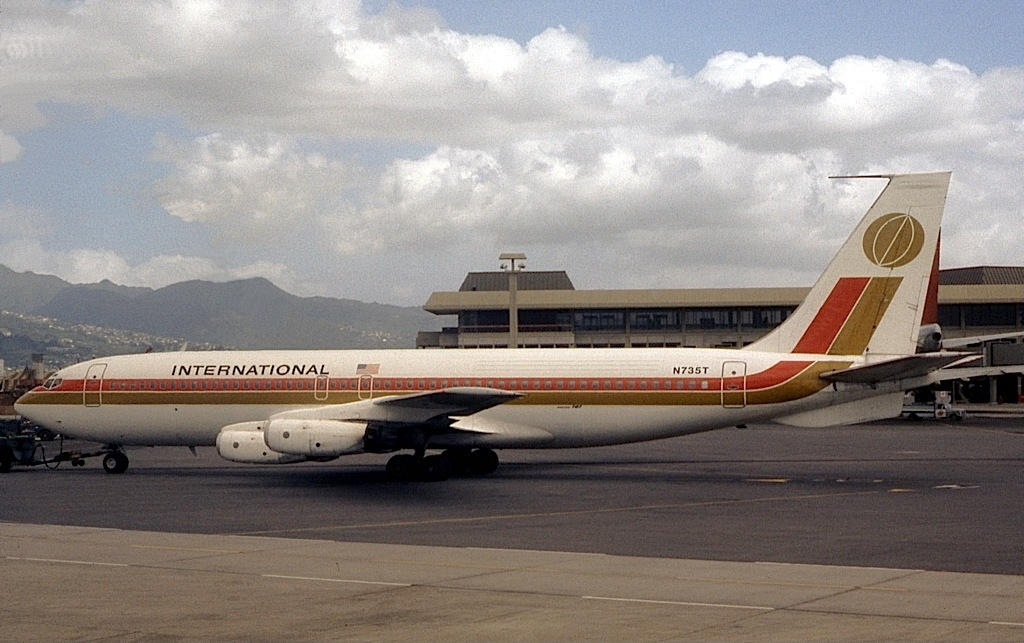
Club International Boeing 707 at Honolulu 1972

Joel Eisenberg, owner of a travel agency, International Travel, founded Club International as a nonprofit corporation under Oregon law in February 1971 as an air travel club. The Federal Aviation Administration certificated the club under Part 123 of the Federal Aviation Regulations in May 1971, the month of its first operation, and Eisenberg acquired the first aircraft, a Boeing 707, from TWA in March 1971, which he leased to the club. By the end of 1972, the club had purchased the 707 from Eisenberg and also acquired a DC-7 and Boeing 720. The club operated effectively a weekly shuttle between Seattle and Honolulu and Seattle and Anchorage. It advertised as having 40,000 members. The Civil Aeronautics Board (CAB) ordered Club International shut in September 1974. The CAB was the now defunct federal agency that, at the time, tightly regulated almost all US commercial air transportation. However, the CAB allowed Club International to operate into the beginning of 1975 to allow its last tours to complete. Through litigation, the club was able to extend this until June 1975.

From summer 1972, Club International started to use the name AirClub International, in response to objections by another travel organization, Washington, DC-based Club Internationale. In 1973, Club Internationale sued to force a name change, which became effective 1974. The organization was referred to by others as "Air Club International" and "Airclub International" as well as "AirClub International." However the air travel club used "AirClub International.

In 1979, Joel and June Eisenberg agreed to pay $200,000 to former AirClub members for never-provided paid travel.

As can be seen from the nearby picture, the aircraft liveries of AirClub International/Club International and of Aeroamerica were essentially identical.

=== Formation ===
Flying Boeing 720 on behalf of the Thunderbird Hotel and Casino 1974

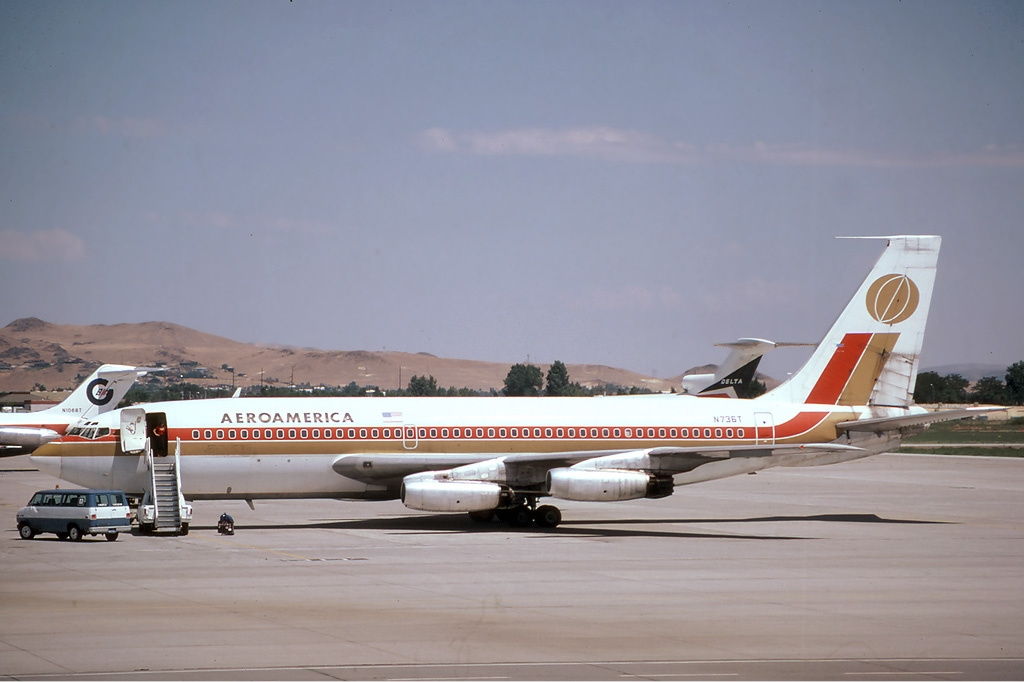
Boeing 720 in 1981

Seattle businessman Arthur Joël Eisenberg was the founder and owner of Aeroamerica, Inc.

Aeroamerica was incorporated in August 1973. On January 9, 1974, the Federal Aviation Administration (FAA) certificated Aeroamerica as a commercial airline operator in conjunction with transferring Standard Airways' dormant Air Operator Certificate (AOC) to the newly formed airline.

=== Start of operations ===
Aeroamerica commenced commercial operations in 1974 with six-second-hand Boeing 720 jetliners. One of these was sourced from Aer Lingus while the remaining five were all ex-Braniff examples. (Aeroamerica's first aircraft had actually been delivered the year before, the same month the company had been incorporated.)

Aeroamerica's Boeing 720s were configured in a 149-seat, single-class seating arrangement. Although Aeroamerica applied similar colour schemes featuring the same basic shapes to most of its aircraft, the actual colour combination differed on each individual plane.

Aeroamerica's female flight attendants wore "hot pants".

=== Overseas expansion ===
Following the decision of US supplemental air carrier Modern Air's parent company GAC Corp to exit the West Berlin charter market in October 1974, Aeroamerica acquired that airline's West Berlin traffic rights.

==== Establishment of West Berlin base ====
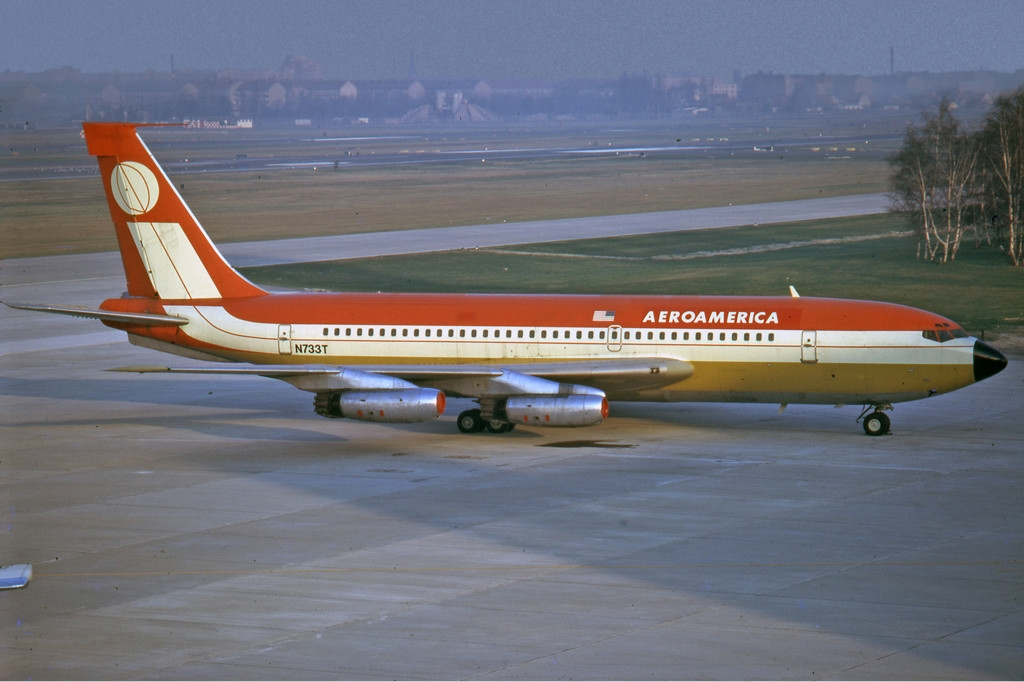
Boeing 720 Berlin Tegel Airport 1974

On October 23, 1974, the day of the new terminal pre-inauguration at West Berlin's Tegel Airport, Aeroamerica stationed its first Boeing 720 at Tegel for crew familiarisation flights. This aircraft was painted in a basic Braniff colour scheme modified with a white Air Club International style cheatline and a black Berliner Flug Ring inscription by the main door. By March 1975, a further two Boeing 720s arrived at the airline's new Berlin Tegel base to fulfill a five-year charter contract the company had concluded with Berliner Flugring, at the time West Berlin's leading package tour operator, to undertake a series of short- and medium-haul inclusive tour (IT) charter flights to the Mediterranean and the Canary Islands from the start of the 1975 summer season. Aeroamerica had taken over this contract from Modern Air. The decision to supply whole-plane charter airline seats to West Berlin's foremost package tour operator enabled the airline to take advantage of the fact that all airlines other than those headquartered in the US, the UK and France – the airlines of the three Western victorious powers of World War II – were banned from West Berlin.

By 1975, all commercial operations were branded Aeroamerica. (Note: this resulted in phasing out the Air Club brand used for flights operated by Aeroamerica's sister company Air Club International.)

External links contains a link to an Aeroamerica promotional film (no sound) which appears to be related to its Berlin operations.

==== Attainment of leadership in West Berlin charter market ====
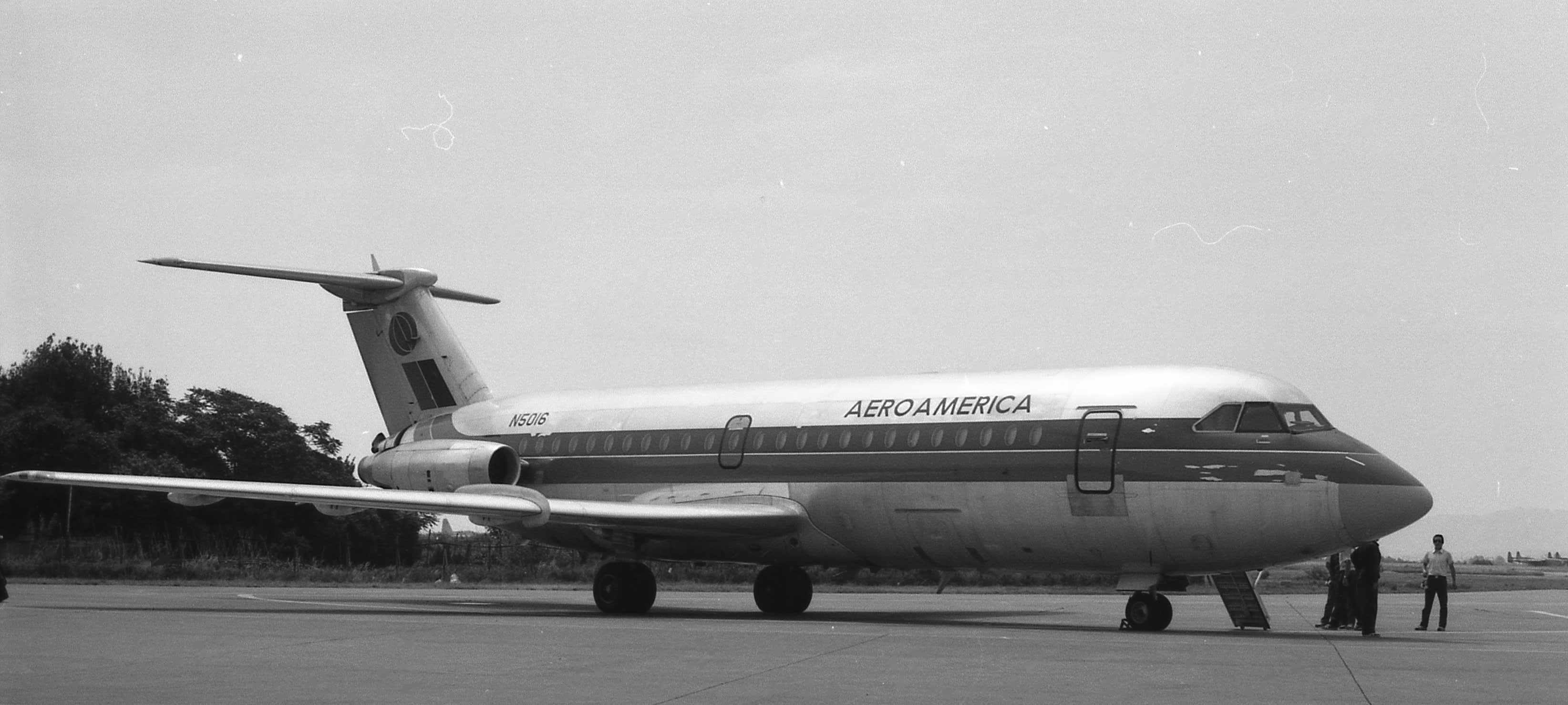
Aeroamerica operated former American Airlines BAC One-Eleven 401AK N5016 on European charter flights out of West Berlin's Tegel Airport during 1976.

By 1976, the size of the airline's Berlin-based fleet had doubled to six aircraft. These included four Boeing 720s as well as a Boeing 707-120B and a BAC One-Eleven 400. The latter had originally belonged to American Airlines. During the summer of 1976, the bulk of Aeroamerica's activities increasingly centred on Berlin Tegel, making it West Berlin's leading charter airline at the time.

=== Decline ===
From 1977, the airline's business, which by that time focused on Berlin (Note: accounting for 30% of all charter operations at Tegel) as well as worldwide ad hoc charters and temporary aircraft leases, gradually declined.

==== Labour troubles ====
On July 1, 1977, 96% of Aeroamerica's unionised German flight attendants voted in favour of strike action in a ballot held by the German Salaried Employees' Union. (Note: Deutsche Angestellten Gewerkschaft (DAG) in German) They demanded pay parity with their colleagues working for Pan Am's Internal German Services (IGS) division and employment contracts governed by local labour law to bring them in line with their unionised counterparts at other Allied airlines that employed their flight attendants locally. (Note: apart from Pan Am's local IGS flight attendants, these included local flight attendants at British Airways and Dan-Air (in contrast, local Laker Airways flight attendants' employment contracts were not governed by these conditions as the company did not recognise unions in any part of its business)) The company countered these demands by arguing that the nature of its business required flight attendants to be stationed anywhere, involving frequent postings to overseas stations at short notice to cover global ad hoc and lease commitments. It furthermore argued that adopting other Allied airlines' local employment conditions and pay for its own flight attendants would restrict operational flexibility and increase costs, that this would undermine its ability to compete globally and that the worldwide nature of its operations made all flight attendants' employment conditions subject to American labour law as well as CAB and FAA regulations to comply with US legal requirements. Initially, the airline was able to maintain its full flying programme at the beginning of the busy summer holiday period despite staff not showing up for work, following the first week of unsuccessful negotiations between Aeroamerica's local management and the DAG union. However, the conflict escalated during the second week when the local management dismissed without notice two flight attendants who had picketed a Tegel-bound flight in Brussels. As the conflict was still unresolved by the end of July and threatened to disrupt the holiday plans of thousands of West Berliners during the peak month of August, management attempted to break the flight attendants' strike by temporarily reducing the number of flight attendants from four to three per aircraft as well as by hiring contract labour from an unnamed UK airline. (Note: local West Berlin media reports at the time alleged that Laker Airways was the unnamed UK airline supplying contract labour to Aeroamerica to help it break its flight attendants' strike) As these developments further aggravated the already tense standoff between the airline and its flight attendants' union, the latter sought to increase pressure on the company to settle the dispute by airing its members' grievances in public. It alleged that Aeroamerica's policy of only complying with minimum FAA requirements resulted in overworking flight attendants, putting lives of crew and passengers at risk in case of an emergency. Despite the negative publicity, management refused to return to the negotiating table and the strike eventually collapsed as the peak summer season drew to a close by the end of August. Following the end of the labour unrest at the company, the FAA subjected Aeroamerica to an unannounced safety audit later the same year. The airline's management alleged that the FAA's move had been prompted by a dismissed flight attendant's act of revenge.

==== Overseas leases ====
The short-term wet- and subleases Aeroamerica had concluded with other airlines partially compensated for the loss of business at its Berlin base. Aeroamerica's wet-/sublease customers included Egyptair, Kıbrıs Türk Hava Yolları (KTHY) – the Northern Cyprus flag carrier, Laker Airways, Libyan Arab Airlines, Pakistan International Airlines and Saudia. For instance, the 1977 Kıbrıs wet lease, which ran for several years, entailed the stationing of a fully crewed Boeing 720 at Ercan to operate the Turkish carrier's scheduled route to Istanbul.

==== Entry into US domestic scheduled market ====
Aeroamerica acquired additional second-hand Boeing 720s and 707s during 1978 to enable it to exploit new business opportunities created by U.S. airline deregulation. In August of that year, Aeroamerica commenced its first-ever fully fledged schedu led air service between Seattle-Tacoma (SEA) and Spokane (GEG). Aeroamerica also operated nonstop jet service between Seattle Boeing Field (BFI) and Spokane in the fall of 1978 with two roundtrip nonstop flights every weekday. The company's new scheduled passenger flights were an immediate success. The following year, the firm prepared to launch additional scheduled services linking Seattle-Tacoma and Portland, Oregon, with Honolulu. According to the Official Airline Guide (OAG), in late 1979 Aeroamerica was operating nonstop Boeing 707 jet service four days a week between Seattle-Tacoma (SEA) and Honolulu (HNL) and was previously operating nonstop Boeing 720 jet service on the weekends between SEA and HNL.

==== Logistical and reliability problems ====
The increasingly far-flung nature of the airline's operations overstretched its small fleet. This was compounded by the fleet's advanced age. The combination of these two factors resulted in growing reliability problems.

==== Closure of West Berlin base ====
In January 1979, Berliner Flugring, Aeroamerica's main overseas business partner, announced that it would not be renewing the five-year contract it had signed with the airline in late 1974, citing reliability issues as the main reason for its decision.

Aeroamerica closed its Berlin base in November 1979, at the end of the summer season.

==== Adoption of new corporate strategy ====
Following its decision to exit the West Berlin charter market, Aeroamerica adopted a new strategy that sought to refocus the airline as a low-fare transatlantic scheduled operator, beginning with a weekly service linking Miami with Berlin via Brussels or Amsterdam from the start of the following year's summer season.

==== Growing financial problems and suspension of operations ====
As a result of growing financial difficulties, Aeroamerica voluntarily surrendered its operating permit during an informal meeting with the FAA at the end of 1979. This action on the airline's part in turn resulted in legal action brought against it by an aircraft lessor and British Airways over unpaid bills concerning the former Berlin operation, as well as the seizure of one of the company's aircraft at Tegel Airport.

==== Reorganisation under Chapter 11 ====
The CAB's subsequent decision to revoke the firm's exempt permit effectively grounded Aeroamerica, resulting in a filing under Chapter 11 of the US bankruptcy code on November 19, 1979, seeking protection from creditors while reorganising the business under the bankruptcy court's supervision.

On June 30, 1980, the FAA suspended Aeroamerica's AOC.

=== Resumption of operations ===
On August 19, 1980, the FAA agreed to restore Aeroamerica's AOC following a joint representation by the airline and its official creditors' committee. However, Aeroamerica's operations continued to be plagued by financial and maintenance issues.

In July 1982, Aeroamerica commenced scheduled services between Seattle and Reno with Boeing 707s.

=== Company closure ===
The airline finally ceased operations during the latter half of 1982, when the FAA grounded it for a maintenance violation regarding the operation of a non-airworthy aircraft.

== Fleet ==
Aeroamerica operated the following aircraft types:

- BAC One-Eleven
- Boeing 707
- Boeing 720
- Douglas DC-7
- McDonnell-Douglas DC-8
- Rockwell Aero Commander.

Aeroamerica and its sister company AirClub International claimed to be the world's largest operators of Boeing "executive aircraft".

== See also ==
- List of defunct airlines of the United States

== Bibliography ==
- Zoeller, Michael (2007). aeroamerica (Report).
- Zoeller, Michael (November 2008). "Aeroamerica – Deregulation Hopeful". Airways. St. Leonards on Sea, UK: HPC Publishing: 44–49.
- Berlin Airport Company – Monthly Timetable Booklets for Berlin Tempelhof and Berlin Tegel Airports (German language edition only), several editions, 1974–1979 (in German). West Berlin, Germany: Berlin Airport Company.
- "Flight International". Flight International – Marketing Stories. Sutton, UK. ISSN 0015-3710. (various backdated issues relating to Aeroamerica, 1974–1982)
