= Northwest Orient Airlines Flight 705 =

1963 aviation accident in Florida

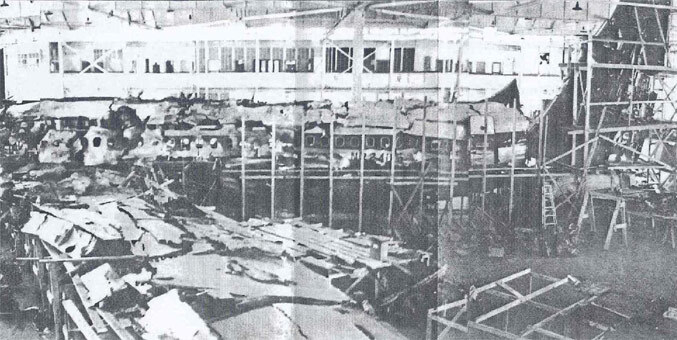
- Reconstructed wreckage of the aircraft

Occurrence
- Date: February 12, 1963
- Summary: In-flight breakup following loss of control
- Site: Everglades, Monroe County, Florida, west of Miami; 25.565°N 80.883°W

Aircraft
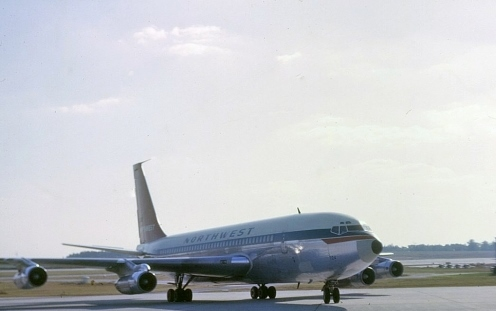
- N724US, the aircraft involved in the accident, seen in 1962
- Aircraft type: Boeing 720-051B
- Operator: Northwest Orient Airlines
- Call sign: NORTHWEST 705
- Registration: N724US
- Flight origin: Miami International Airport, Florida, United States
- Stopover: O'Hare International Airport, Illinois, United States
- Destination: Portland International Airport, Oregon, United States
- Occupants: 43
- Passengers: 35
- Crew: 8
- Fatalities: 43
- Survivors: 0

Northwest Orient Airlines Flight 705 was a scheduled passenger flight operated by a Boeing 720 on February 12, 1963, that broke up in midair and crashed into the Florida Everglades shortly after takeoff from Miami International Airport in a severe thunderstorm. The plane was destined for Portland, Oregon, via Chicago, Spokane, and Seattle.

== Aircraft ==
N724US, was a Boeing 720B manufactured July 14, 1961. Since then it had accumulated 4,684 flight hours. It was powered by four Pratt & Whitney JT3D-1 engines.

== Crew ==
Captain Roy W. Almquist, aged 47, had accumulated 17,385 flight hours, 150 of which were on the Boeing 720. He had type ratings in the DC-3, DC-4, DC-6, DC-7, Lockheed L-188 Electra and the Boeing 720.

First officer Robert J. Feller, aged 38, had accumulated 11,799 flight hours, 1,093 of which were on the Boeing 720. He had type ratings in the DC-4, DC-6, DC-7 and the Boeing 720.

Second Officer Allen R. Friesen, aged 29, had accumulated 4,853 flight hours, 523 of which were on the Boeing 720.

== Accident ==
Prior to departing from Miami in the early afternoon, the Northwest Orient flight crew questioned the ground controller at the airport about the departure routes being used, and the controller replied that most flights were departing "either through a southwest climb or a southeast climb and then back over the top of it."

After the Boeing 720 lifted off from Runway 27L, helmed by captain Roy Almquist, it made a left turn, based on radar vectors from Miami Departure Control, to avoid areas of anticipated turbulence associated with thunderstorm activity. Another flight had followed the same guidance shortly before the jet took off.

While maintaining 5,000 feet (1,500 m) and a heading of 300 degrees, Flight 705 contacted controllers and requested clearance to climb to a higher altitude. After a discussion between the flight and the radar departure controller about the storm activity, and while clearance to climb was being coordinated with the Miami Air Route Traffic Control Center, the flight advised "Ah-h we're in the clear now. We can see it out ahead ... looks pretty bad."

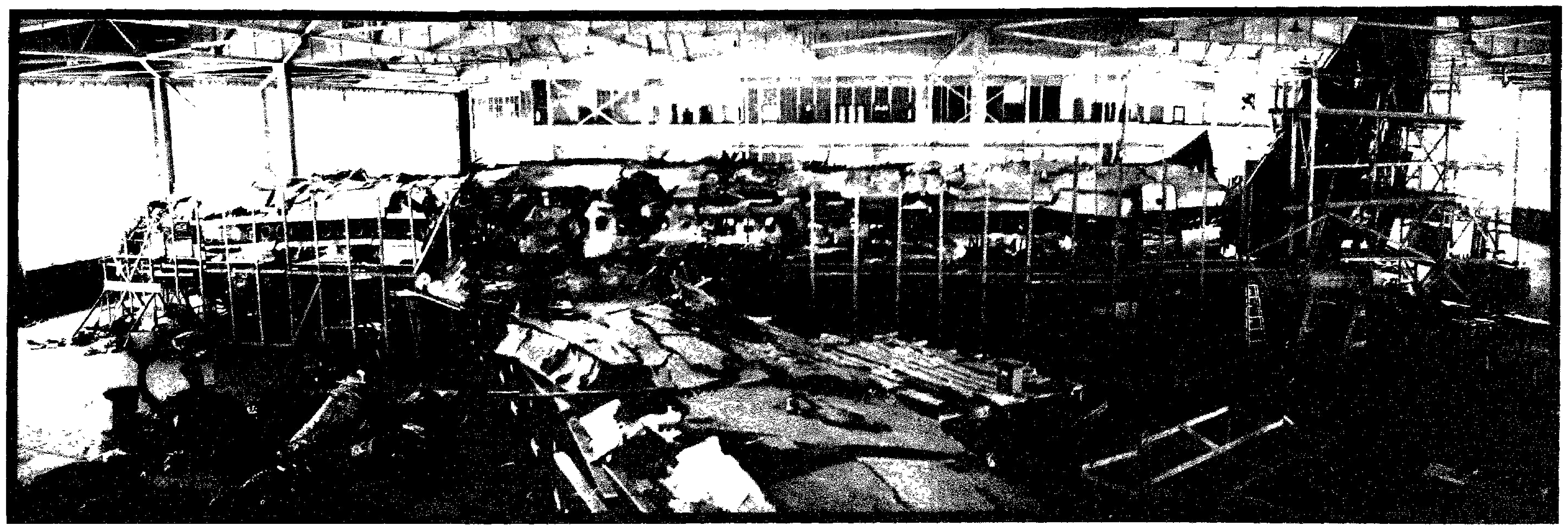
Another angle of the reconstructed wreckage

At 13:43 EST, Flight 705 was cleared to climb to flight level 250 (25,000 feet (7,600 m)). They responded, "OK ahhh, we'll make a left turn about thirty degrees here and climb..." The controller asked if 270 degrees was their selected climb-out heading, and they replied that this would take them "... out in the open again..." Controllers granted the jet clearance accordingly. Following some discussion about the severity of the turbulence, which was described as moderate to heavy, the flight advised, "OK, you better run the rest of them off the other way then."

At 13:45, control of Flight 705 was transferred to Miami Air Route Traffic Control Center. There were communication difficulties, although after the jet was provided with a different frequency to use, the flight crew established contact with Miami ARTCC. Several minutes after contact was established, the jet entered a severe updraft. The jet initially reacted with a nose-down maneuver, to which the pilots probably reacted with a pitch-up. This caused its altitude to begin increasing with a rate of climb gradually increasing to approximately 9,000 feet per minute (2,700 m/min). This caused the airspeed to drop from 270 to 215 knots (311 to 247 mph; 500 to 398 km/h), which prompted the captain to apply full nose down elevator and trim. Following this input, the rate of climb decreased through zero when the altitude peaked momentarily at just above 19,285 feet (5,878 m). As the peak altitude was approached, the vertical accelerations changed rapidly from 1G to about -2G.

In the next seven seconds, the negative acceleration continued to increase at a slower rate, with several fluctuations, to a mean value of about -2.8G, and the jet began diving toward the ground with increasing rapidity, exceeding the 90° angle. As the descent continued, the acceleration trace went from the high negative peak to 1.5G, as the pilot tried to pull the plane out of the dive, pulling on the control column and applying trim.

Below 10,000 feet (3,000 m), the forward fuselage broke up as a result of the forces of the dive. The main failures in both wings and horizontal stabilizers were in a downward direction, and virtually symmetrical. The forward fuselage broke upward and the vertical stabilizer failed to the left. All four engines generally separated before the debris of the aircraft fell in an unpopulated area of the Everglades National Park, 37 miles (60 km) west-southwest of Miami International Airport.

== Investigation ==
=== Upset ===
The force required to move the elevators downward topped at 10°, and as the angle increased, the force required lowered. The negative Gs caused by the pitchdown would have lifted the pilots from their seats, blurring their vision and making them unable to hold the yoke, which was in the full forward position due to the increased sensitivity. Due to this it was next to impossible to start recovering before reaching 320 knots (the maximum airspeed for recovery).

=== Probable cause ===
The final report on the crash determined the cause of the accident to be:

The unfavorable interaction of severe vertical air drafts and large longitudinal control displacements, resulting in a longitudinal upset from which a successful recovery was not made.

— Civil Aeronautics Board

== See also ==
- BOAC Flight 911 – another Boeing 707 that disintegrated in turbulence
- Eastern Air Lines Flight 401 – a 1972 accident in which a Lockheed L-1011 TriStar crashed into the Florida Everglades north-east from where Flight 705 crashed
- ValuJet Flight 592 – a 1996 accident in which an aircraft crashed into the Florida Everglades north-east from where Flight 705 crashed
