= Children's Museum of Bogotá =

Museum in Colombia

- Museo de los Niños

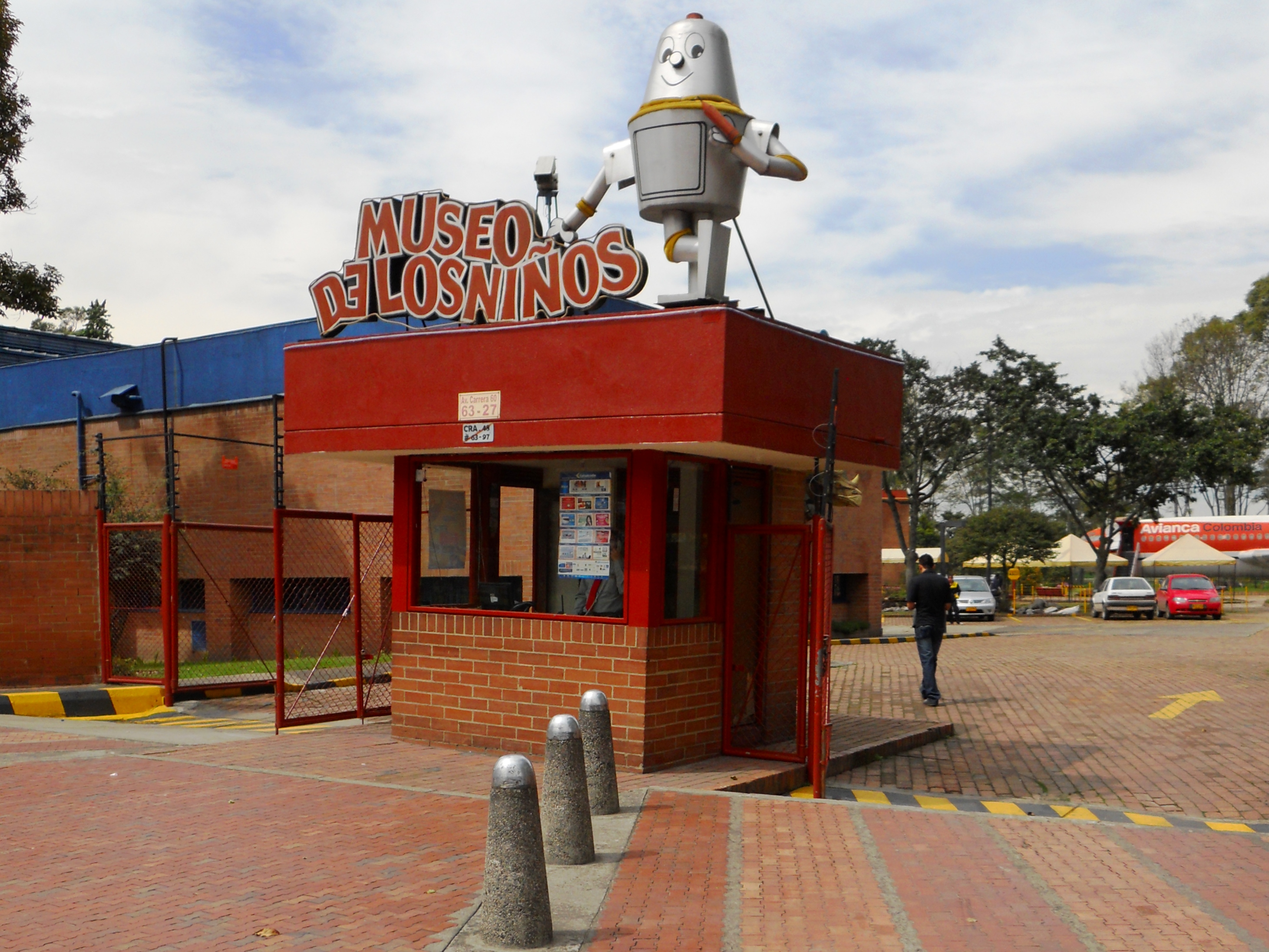
- Museum ticket booth
- Established: 1986
- Dissolved: 2017
- Location: Bogotá, Colombia
- Coordinates: 4.6616°N 74.0887°W
- Type: Children's museum

The Children's Museum of Bogotá (Fundación Museo de los Niños) was a privately managed museum foundation in Bogotá, Colombia's capital city, founded in 1986 and opened to the public in 1987. It aimed at teaching children about science, technology, culture and arts. The foundation operated the Children's Museum in an 8,000 m^{2} (86,000 sq ft) building in the geographical centre of Bogotá, in which over 23 different modules and hundreds of individual exhibits were housed. The museum served approximately 150,000 visitors per year — 69% of them children under 11 years of age that come to "learn by playing" in the exhibits.

In addition to guided tours, the Children's Museum conducted workshops, special vacation programs for children and highly structured events for schools.

== Programs and attractions ==
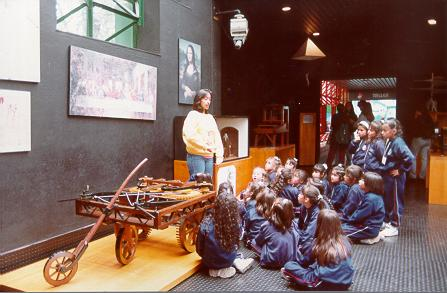
Leonardo da Vinci exhibit

To celebrate its 15th anniversary, the museum invited the most important young Colombian artists to paint a mural on the museum walls. This resulted in a collection of 42 murals which have become a landmark for art students in Bogotá. Another highly important program of the Museum is the Computer Clubhouse – an international program promoted by the Intel Corporation and the Museum of Science, Boston. Computer Clubhouse teaches children of low-income families computer skills for computer animation, graphic design, composing and editing, as a means to close the digital divide in society. An introduction to robotics is also included in this program.

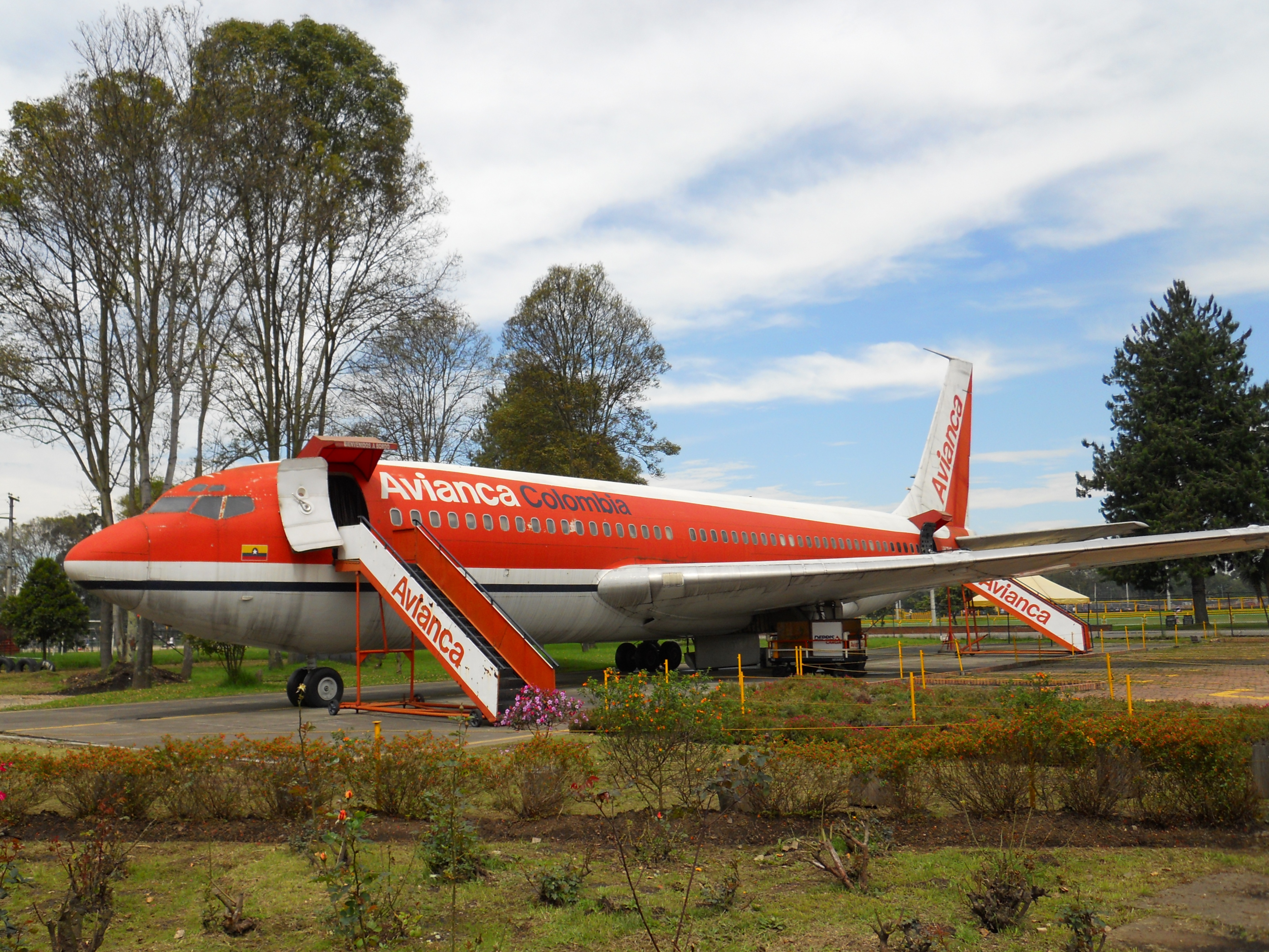
Avianca airplane HK-749

In the outer gardens of the museum, a real Boeing 720 aircraft (without actual function, fuel, electricity or engines) was present to teach children the basics of aeronautics. The airliner was donated by Avianca (the biggest airline in Colombia) in the mid-1980s.

The museum also featured a room with a small representation of a city's roads to teach children traffic signs and behavior while driving or walking on the streets.

== Closure ==
The Museum was returned to the city in November 2017; it was in poor condition after decades of use and did not conform to modern building standards. It was decided that a new attraction for children would replace the old Museum. In 2018, it became a park for children. Its main attractions are now bouncing houses, bicycle rides, and races for kids.
