= Pakistan International Airlines Flight 705 =

1965 aviation accident

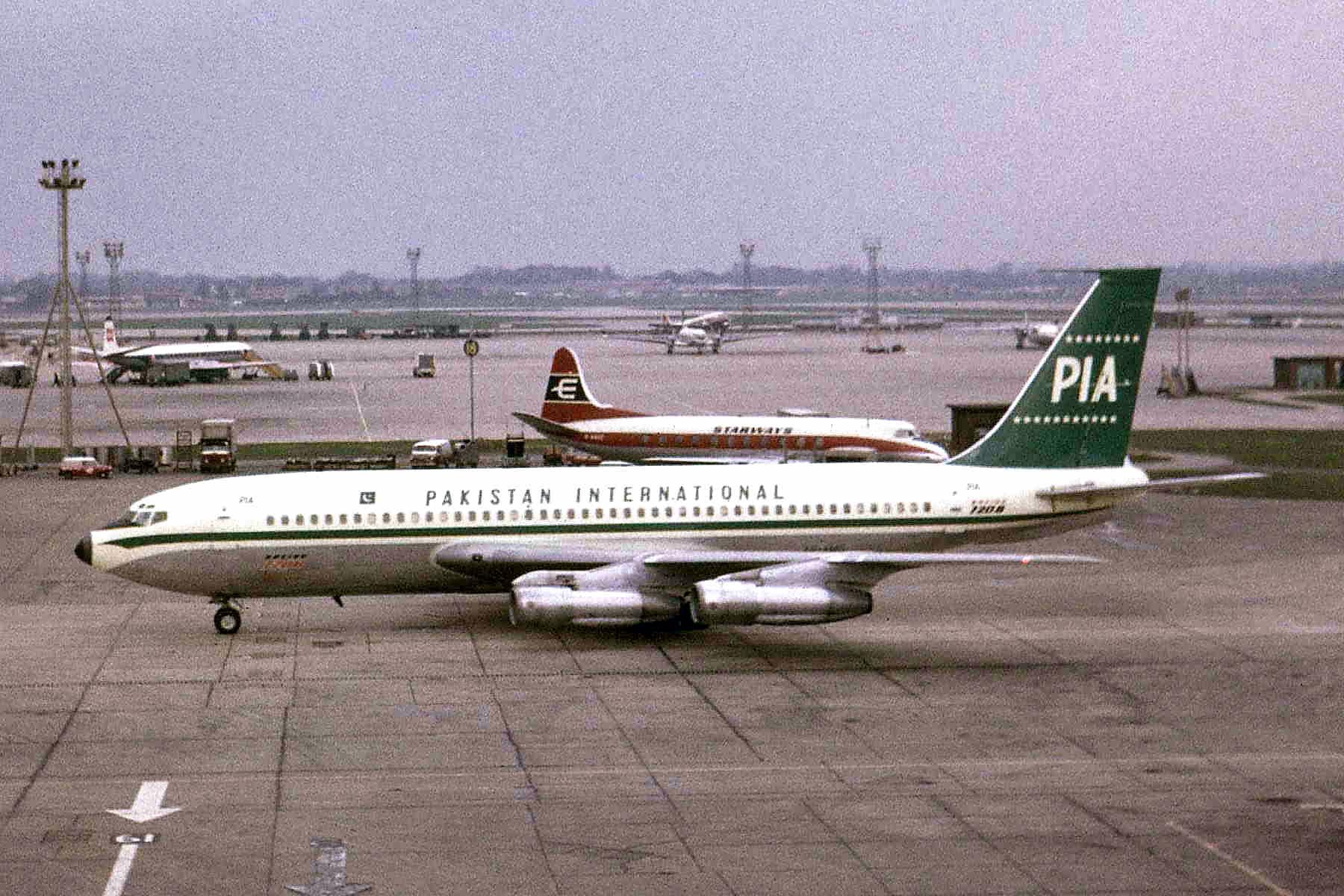
- A PIA 720, similar to the one involved.

Accident
- Date: 20 May 1965
- Summary: Controlled flight into terrain during approach; excessive descent - cause undetermined
- Site: near Cairo International Airport, Egypt; 30°07′19″N 31°24′20″E

Aircraft
- Aircraft type: Boeing 720-040B (Note: The aircraft was a Boeing 720B model; at the time this aircraft was built, Boeing assigned a unique code for each company that bought one of its aircraft, which was applied as a suffix to the model number at the time the aircraft was built, hence "720-040B".)
- Operator: Pakistan International Airlines
- IATA flight No.: PK705
- ICAO flight No.: PIA705
- Call sign: PAKISTAN 705
- Registration: AP-AMH
- Flight origin: Karachi Airport, Pakistan
- 2nd stopover: Dhahran International Airport, Saudi Arabia
- 3rd stopover: Cairo International Airport, Egypt
- Last stopover: Geneva Airport, Switzerland
- Destination: London Heathrow Airport, United Kingdom
- Occupants: 127
- Passengers: 114
- Crew: 13
- Fatalities: 121
- Injuries: 6
- Survivors: 6

Pakistan International Airlines Flight 705 (PK705) was a Boeing 720 airliner that crashed while descending to land at Cairo International Airport on 20 May 1965. Of the 127 passengers and crew on board, all but 6 were killed.

The crash was the deadliest aviation disaster to occur in Egypt at the time, and is now the third-deadliest. It is also the deadliest aviation disaster involving the Boeing 720.

== Accident ==
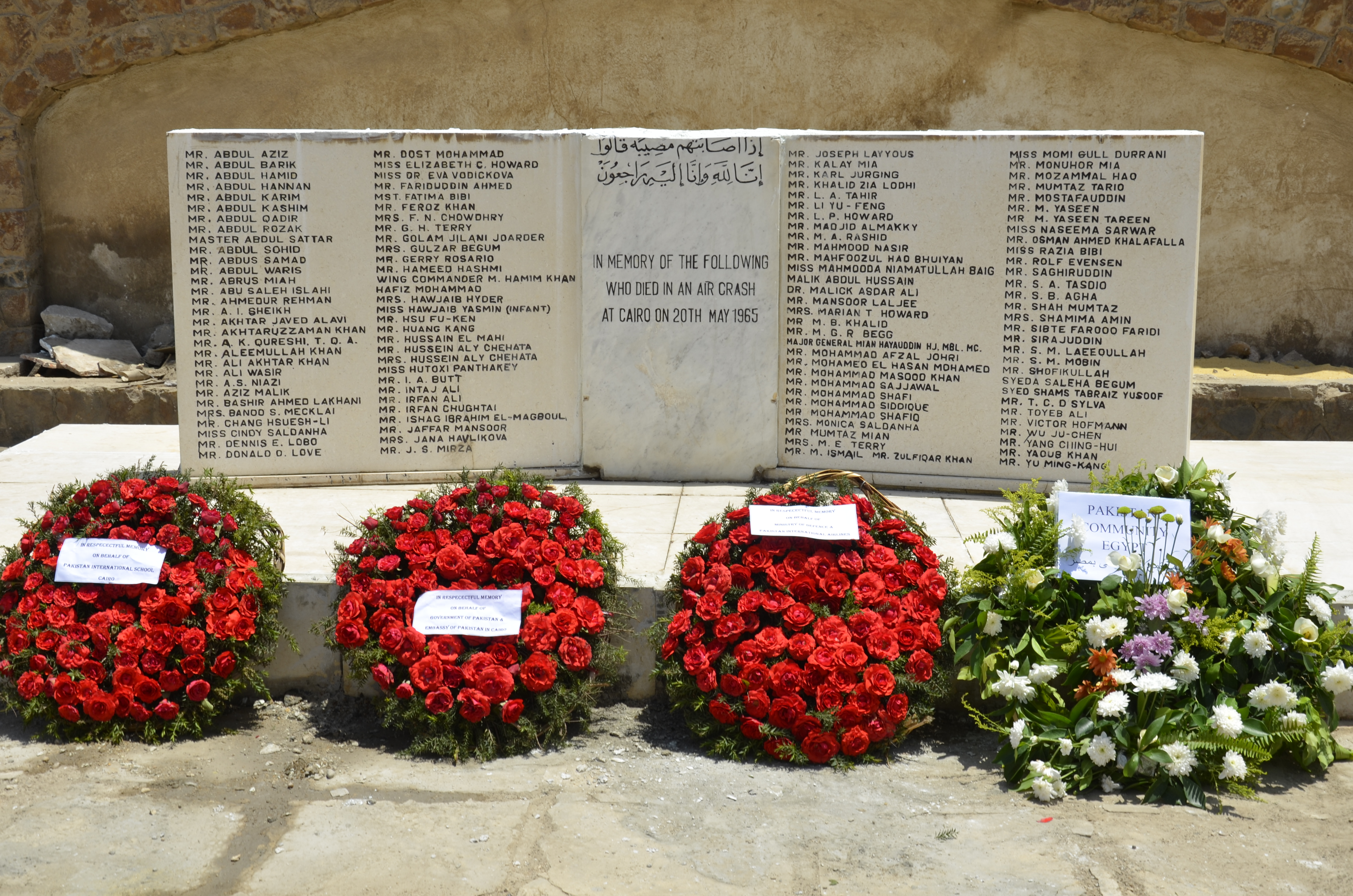
Wreaths laid at a memorial to the crash on 20 May 2013 by representatives from the Embassy of Pakistan to Egypt and local Pakistani community members

Flight 705 on 20 May 1965 was an inaugural flight between Karachi, Pakistan and London, United Kingdom and was carrying distinguished guests and journalists among the 114 passengers. The aircraft was scheduled to stop at Dhahran in Saudi Arabia, Cairo and then Geneva before completing its journey to London. As the aircraft was on final approach to Cairo International Airport, the pilot reported problems with the flaps; shortly thereafter, the aircraft crashed southeast of the airport and broke up as it exploded into flames. Six of the passengers were thrown clear of the wreckage, but everyone else on board was killed. Among the dead was the Chinese aircraft designer Huang Zhiqian, who was chief designer of the fighter jet Shenyang J-8.

== Aircraft ==
The aircraft was a Boeing 720-040B (Note: The aircraft was a Boeing 720B model; at the time this aircraft was built, Boeing assigned a unique code for each company that bought one of its aircraft, which was applied as a suffix to the model number at the time the aircraft was built, hence "720-040B".) with the registration AP-AMH and manufacturer's serial number 18379; it was first flown on 19 October 1962 and delivered to Pakistan International Airlines on 7 November 1962. At the time of the accident, the aircraft had flown 8378 hours.

== Investigation ==
On 26 May, local police reported that a transistor radio had been found in the wreckage of the aircraft with jewellery valued at $120,000 hidden in it.

The probable cause of the crash was that "the aircraft did not maintain the adequate height for the circuit and continued to descend until it contacted the ground. The reason for that abnormal continuation of descent is unknown."

== See also ==
- Aviation safety
- List of accidents and incidents involving commercial aircraft
