= Pratt & Whitney JT3D =

Family of turbofan aircraft engines

JT3D/TF33
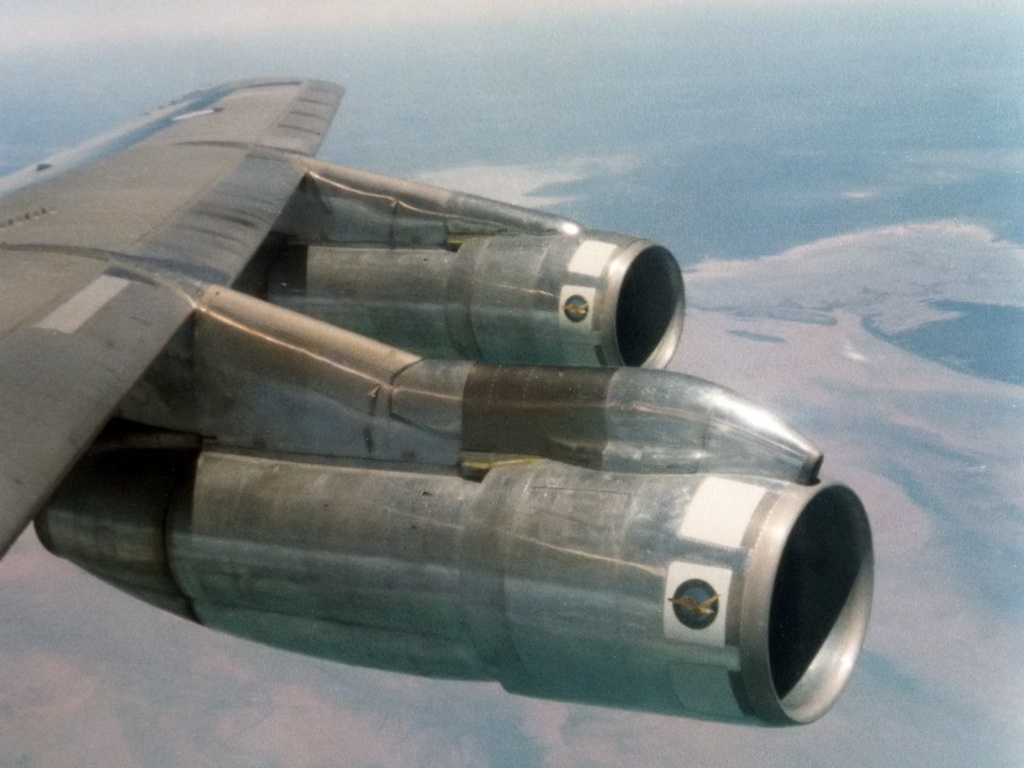
- JT3D-3B on a Royal Australian Air Force Boeing 707
- Type: Turbofan
- National origin: United States
- Manufacturer: Pratt & Whitney
- First run: 1958
- Major applications: Boeing 707; Boeing B-52H Stratofortress; Boeing KC-135E Stratotanker; Douglas DC-8; Lockheed C-141 Starlifter
- Number built: c. 8,600
- Developed from: Pratt & Whitney J57/JT3C

The Pratt & Whitney JT3D is an early turbofan aircraft engine derived from the Pratt & Whitney JT3C turbojet. It was first run in 1958 and was first flown in 1959 under a B-45 Tornado test aircraft. Over 8,000 JT3Ds were produced between 1959 and 1985. Most JT3D engines still in service today are used on military aircraft, where the engine is referred to by its US military designation of TF33.

== Design and development ==
Aware of the competition from the Rolls-Royce Conway turbofan, Pratt & Whitney decided to develop the JT3D turbofan from the JT3C turbojet for later deliveries of the Boeing 707 and the Douglas DC-8, then nearing entry into service. A 2-stage fan replaced the first 3 stages of the 9-stage JT3C LP compressor. On the LP turbine, the second stage was enlarged and a third stage added.

Unlike GE with the CJ805-23, Pratt & Whitney had not undertaken any transonic fan research prior to designing the JT3D, so they were unable to incorporate a single stage unit into the specification. Instead P&W designed a 2-stage unit based on some research they had done to support the J91 nuclear turbojet.

On the Boeing 707 the JT3D fan nacelle was relatively short, whereas the Douglas DC-8 installation had a full-length fan cowl. Pratt & Whitney provided a kit whereby JT3Cs could be converted to the JT3D specification, and performance, during an overhaul.

In 1959, important orders for the engine were the Boeing 707-120B and Boeing 720B when American Airlines ordered one 707 powered by JT3D turbofans and KLM ordered a JT3D-powered Douglas DC-8. Earlier 707s and DC-8s had been powered by the JT3C and JT4A turbojets, and the improved efficiency of the turbofan soon attracted the airlines. A JT3D-powered 707-123B and 720-023B (the suffix B was to indicate a turbofan-powered aircraft) entered service with American Airlines on the same day, March 12, 1961.

The Boeing KC-135 Stratotankers were all originally powered by turbojet engines. With the demise of many airline 707s, the United States Air Force took the opportunity to buy the surplus airframes and use the engines to re-fit the KC-135As used by the Air National Guard and reserve squadrons with the civilian JT3D (designated TF33-PW-102). Over 150 aircraft were modified and the former KC-135A was re-designated the KC-135E.

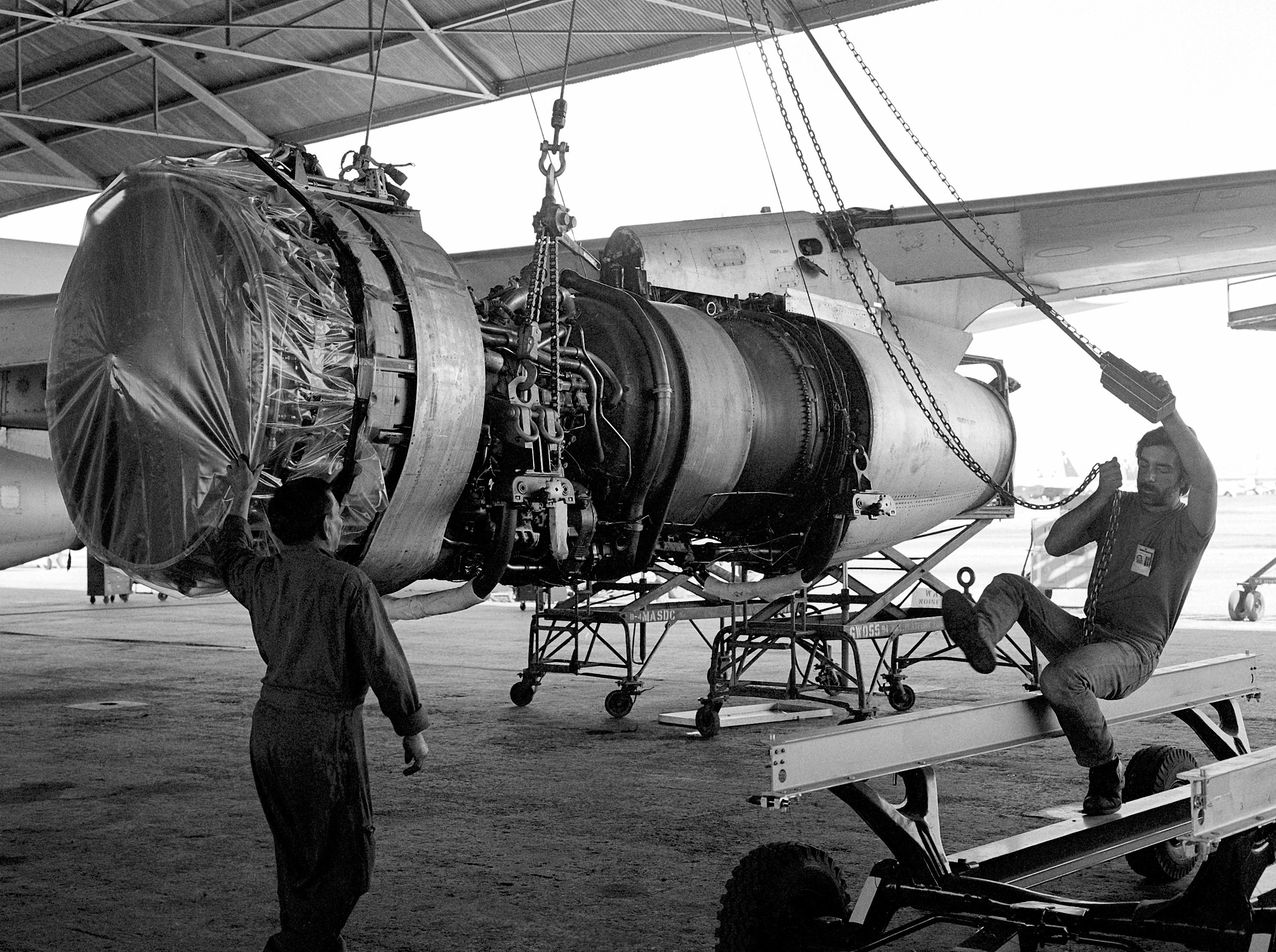
JT3Ds from Boeing 707s are used to re-fit USAF KC-135As, 1984.

After long service for both airlines and air forces, the number of JT3D-powered aircraft is steadily decreasing. One hundred and thirty five KC-135s use the JT3D, while 354 were fitted with CFM International CFM56 engines, which provide greater thrust, lower fuel consumption, and increased operational flexibility due to their lower noise footprint. The noise of the JT3D is one of the reasons NATO has debated re-fitting their E-3 Sentry AWACS fleet, since the aircraft are subject to restrictions that aircraft with modern engines are not. Operational flexibility would be further increased due to the ability of higher power engines to increase the ceiling of the aircraft, extending the horizon for radar surveillance; for instance, RAF, French and Saudi E-3s routinely fly higher than NATO/USAF counterparts.

In 1961, the TF33-powered Boeing B-52H Stratofortress entered service. The "H" model of the B-52 was the only production variant of the heavy bomber to be fitted with turbofan engines, and is the only model remaining in United States Air Force service. It is expected to remain as a mainstay of the Air Force heavy bomber fleet until at least 2040, with options for replacing the 8 TF33 engines with more modern equivalents being considered. In April 2020, the USAF released a request for proposals for 608 commercial replacement engines, with the plan to award the contract in May 2021. In September 2021, the USAF announced that the TF33 would be replaced by the Rolls-Royce F130.

== Variants ==
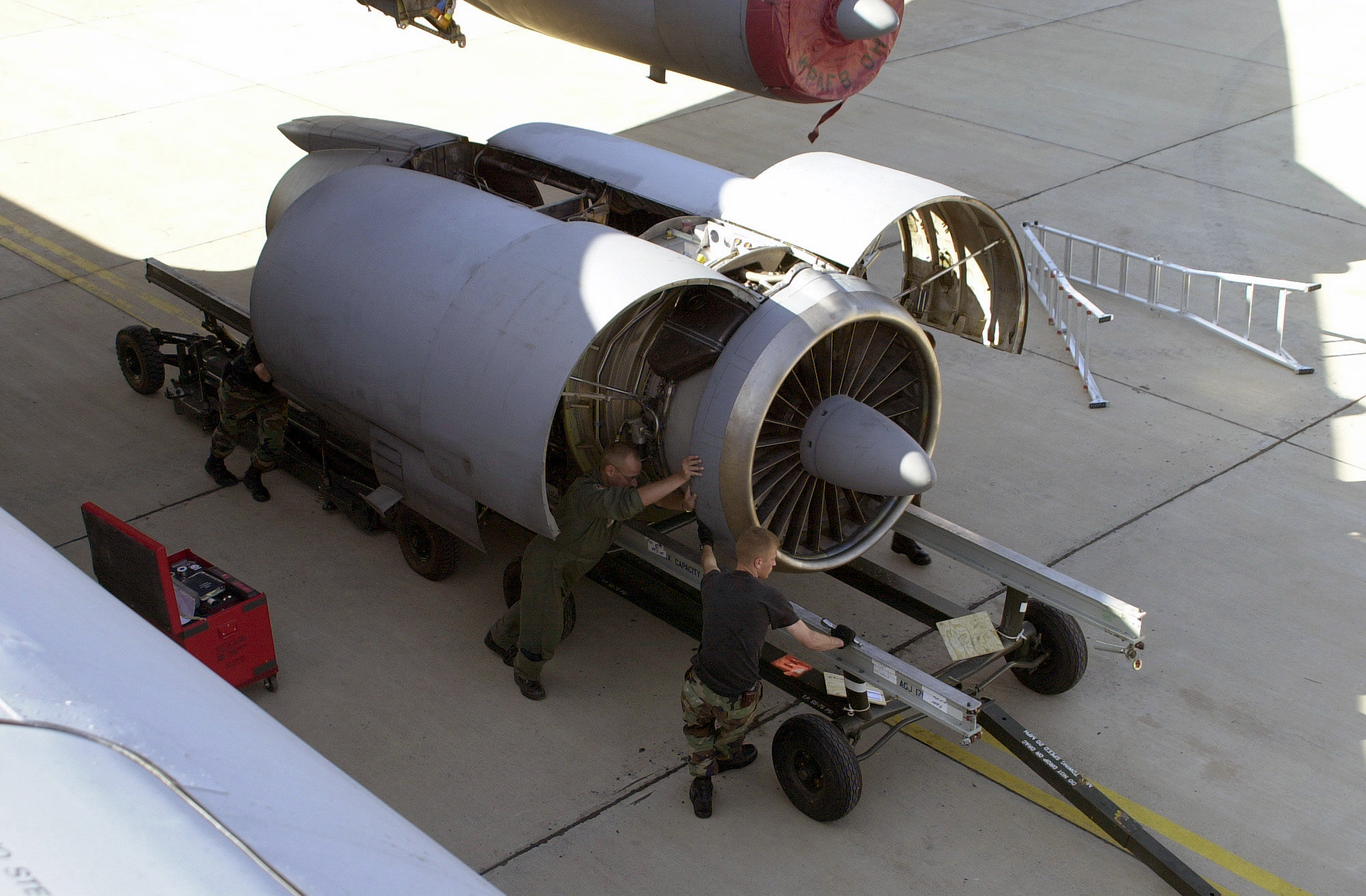
TF33-P-7 engine of a C-141B

JT3D-1
17,000 lbf (75.62 kN) thrust civil version, (Water injection optional)
JT3D-2
(TF33-P-3) 17,000 lbf (75.62 kN)
JT3D-3
18,000 lbf (80.07 kN), (Water injection optional)
JT3D-3A
(TF33-P-5) 18,000 lbf (80.07 kN)
JT3D-3B
18,000 lbf (80.07 kN) thrust civil version
JT3D-5A
(TF33-P-7) 18,000 lbf (80.07 kN), (Water injection optional)
JT3D-8A
(TF33-P-7) 18,000 lbf (80.07 kN), (Water injection optional)
JT3D-7
19,000 lbf (84.52 kN) thrust civil version
JT3D-15
22,500 lbf (100.08 kN) thrust civil version for the unbuilt 707-820
TF33-P-3
17,000 lbf (75.62 kN) thrust for the Boeing B-52H Stratofortress
TF33-P-5
18,000 lbf (80.07 kN) thrust for the Boeing KC-135 Stratotanker
TF33-P-7
21,000 lbf (93.41 kN) thrust for the Lockheed C-141 Starlifter
TF33-P-9
18,000 lbf (80.07 kN) thrust for the Boeing EC-135C and Boeing RC-135C
TF33-P-11
16,000 lbf (71.17 kN) thrust for the Martin RB-57F Canberra
TF33-PW-100A
21,500 lbf (95.64 kN) thrust for the Boeing E-3 Sentry

TF33-PW-102/A

TF33-PW-103

== Applications ==
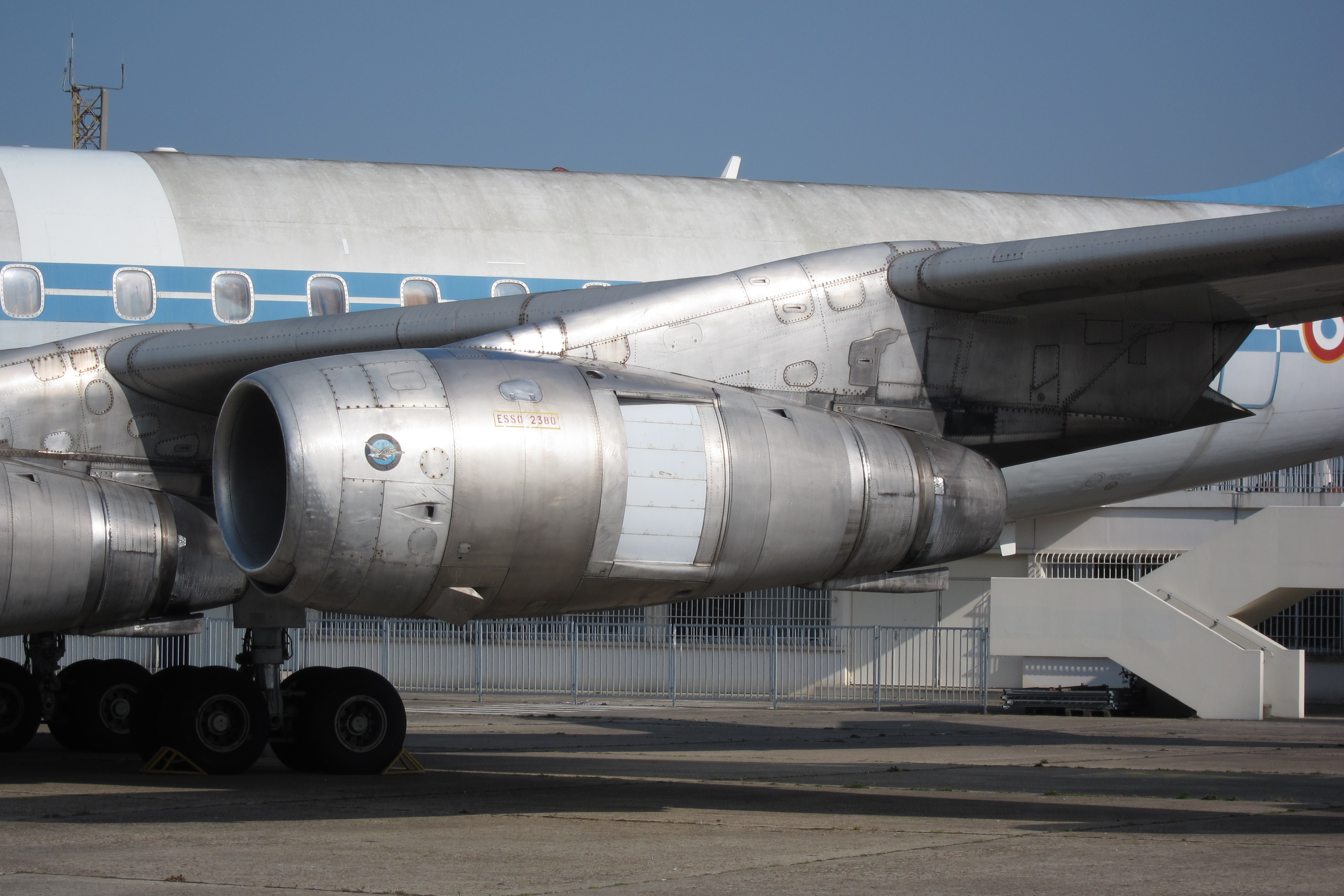
JT3D on a Douglas DC-8

TF33/JT3D on Boeing VC-137B at Seattle Museum of Flight

Civilian (JT3D)

- Boeing 707
- Boeing 720
- Douglas DC-8
- Shanghai Y-10

Military (TF33)

- Boeing B-52H Stratofortress
- Boeing C-18
- Boeing C-135 series
  - EC-135
  - KC-135D/E Stratotanker (re-engined from retired donor airliners)
  - OC-135B Open Skies
  - RC-135
  - WC-135
- Boeing CC-137
- Boeing E-3 Sentry
- Boeing VC-137B/C Stratoliner
- Northrop Grumman E-8 Joint STARS
- Lockheed C-141 Starlifter
- Martin/General Dynamics RB-57F Canberra

== Specifications (JT3D-8A / TF33-P-7) ==
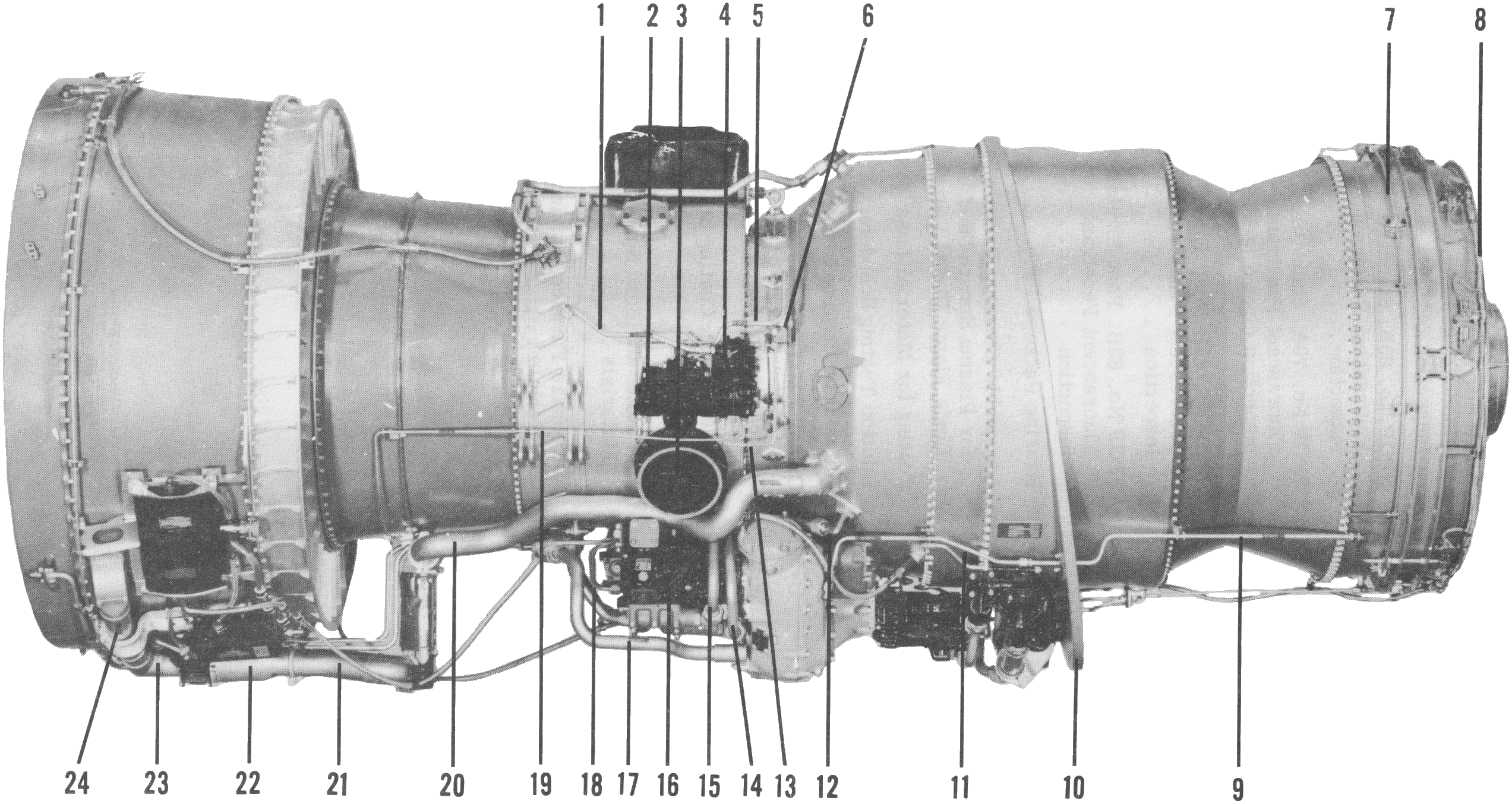
TF33-P-3 profile view

Data from Aircraft engines of the World 1966/67

==== General characteristics ====
- Type: Turbofan
- Length: 142.3 in (3,610 mm)
- Diameter: 53 in (1,300 mm)
- Dry weight: 4,605 lb (2,089 kg)

==== Components ====
- Compressor: Axial flow, 2-stage fan, 6-stage LP compressor and 7-stage HP compressor
- Combustors: cannular, 8 flame tubes
- Turbine: Axial flow, single stage HP turbine and 3-stage LP turbine
- Fuel type: Mil-J-5624 / JP-4 / JP-5
- Oil system: Return system 50 psi (340 kPa)

==== Performance ====
- Maximum thrust: 17,000 lbf (76 kN) take-off (flat-rated to ISA); partial thrust restoration with water injection
- Overall pressure ratio: 16:1 overall
- Bypass ratio: 1.42:1
- Air mass flow: 500 lb/s (230 kg/s)
- Turbine inlet temperature: 1,150 K (880 °C; 1,610 °F) at take-off, SLS, ISA
- Specific fuel consumption: 0.78 lb/(lbf⋅h) (22 g/(kN⋅s)) at 4,000 lbf (18 kN) thrust, M 0.82, 35,000 ft (11,000 m), ISA
- Thrust-to-weight ratio: 3.9 bare engine

== See also ==
Related development

- Pratt & Whitney JT3C/J57
- Pratt & Whitney JT4A/J75

Comparable engines

- Kuznetsov NK-8
- Rolls-Royce Conway
- Soloviev D-30

Related lists

- List of aircraft engines

== Bibliography ==
- Taylor, John W.R. FRHistS. ARAeS (1962). Jane's All the World's Aircraft 1962-63. London: Sampson, Low, Marston & Co Ltd.
