= Congress Street (Hartford, Connecticut) =

- U.S. National Register of Historic Places
- U.S. Historic district
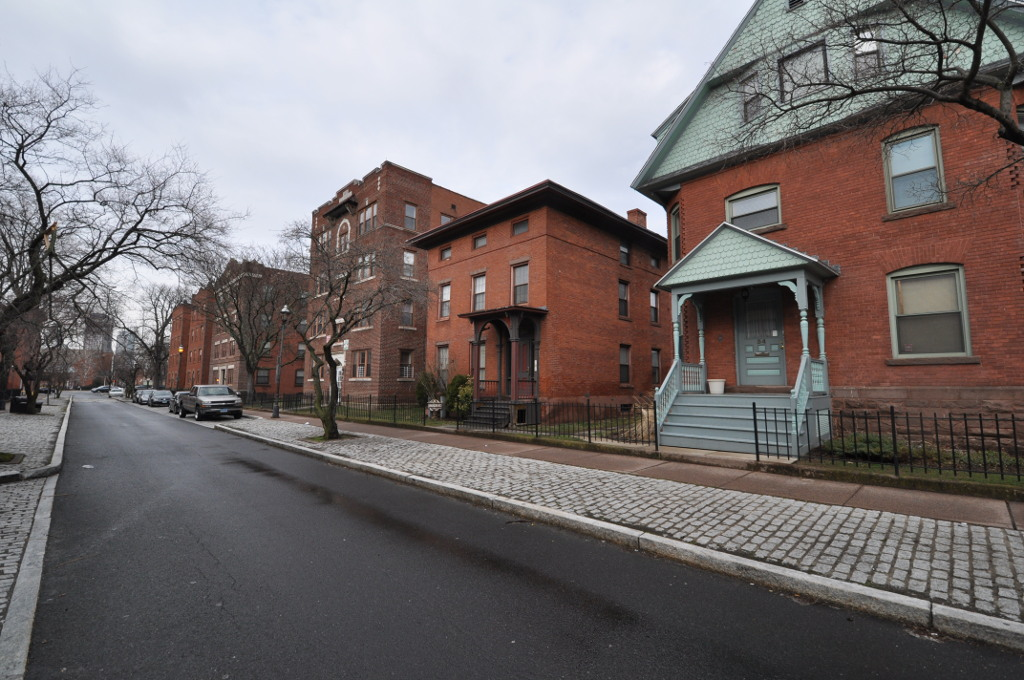

- Location within Connecticut Location within the United States
- Location: Both sides of Congress Street from Wyllys to Morris Streets, 54-58 Maple Avenue, Hartford, Connecticut
- Coordinates: 41°45′16″N 72°40′34″W
- Area: 10 acres (4.0 ha)
- Built: 1855
- Architect: Bissell, H. & S.
- Architectural style: Greek Revival, Italianate
- NRHP reference No.: 75001927 (original); 92000903 (increase)

Significant dates
- Added to NRHP: October 6, 1975
- Boundary increase: July 24, 1992

Congress Street is a city street in the South Green Neighborhood of Hartford, Connecticut. Extending for a single block from the South Green to Morris Street, it was developed in the 1850s with modest two-family residences, with infill development of larger apartment blocks around the turn of the 20th century. The entire street was listed on the National Register of Historic Places in 1975 as a good example of a well-preserved late-19th century residential street.

== Description ==
Congress Street is located South of Downtown Hartford. It is a narrow one-way street extending South from its Junction with Wyllys Street at South Green, to Morris Street. It is lined with paved sidewalks on both sides, which are separated from the street by a section of cobblestone construction and granite curbs. At the Northern End of the Street is its only commercial building, a triangular "flatiron" building shaped by the Junction of Maple Avenue, Wyllys, and Congress. It houses commercial establishments on the ground floor and residences on the upper floors. The West Side of the Street is predominantly lined by a series of Italianate two-family brick houses built in the late 1850s, while the east side is taken up by larger apartment block dating to the turn of the 20th century.

Congress Street was laid out in 1855, serving in part as an access to the back sides of large mansion houses facing Wethersfield Avenue, which it parallels to the east, and whose properties extended all the way to Congress Street. The West Side of Congress Street was developed in the 1850s, benefiting from the growth of the Colt Armory to the East. Prominent residents of the early period included Francis A. Pratt and Amos Whitney, machinists who founded a business now known as Pratt & Whitney Measurement Systems, and whose names grace the more well-known Pratt & Whitney aircraft engine manufacturer. In the late 19th and early 20th centuries, many of the estates facing Wethersfield Avenue were subdivided or redeveloped, and the apartment blocks facing Congress Street were built. The area underwent a major rehabilitation in the 1970s to restore its 19th-century character.

== See also ==
- National Register of Historic Places listings in Hartford, Connecticut
