= George J. Mead =

American aircraft engineer

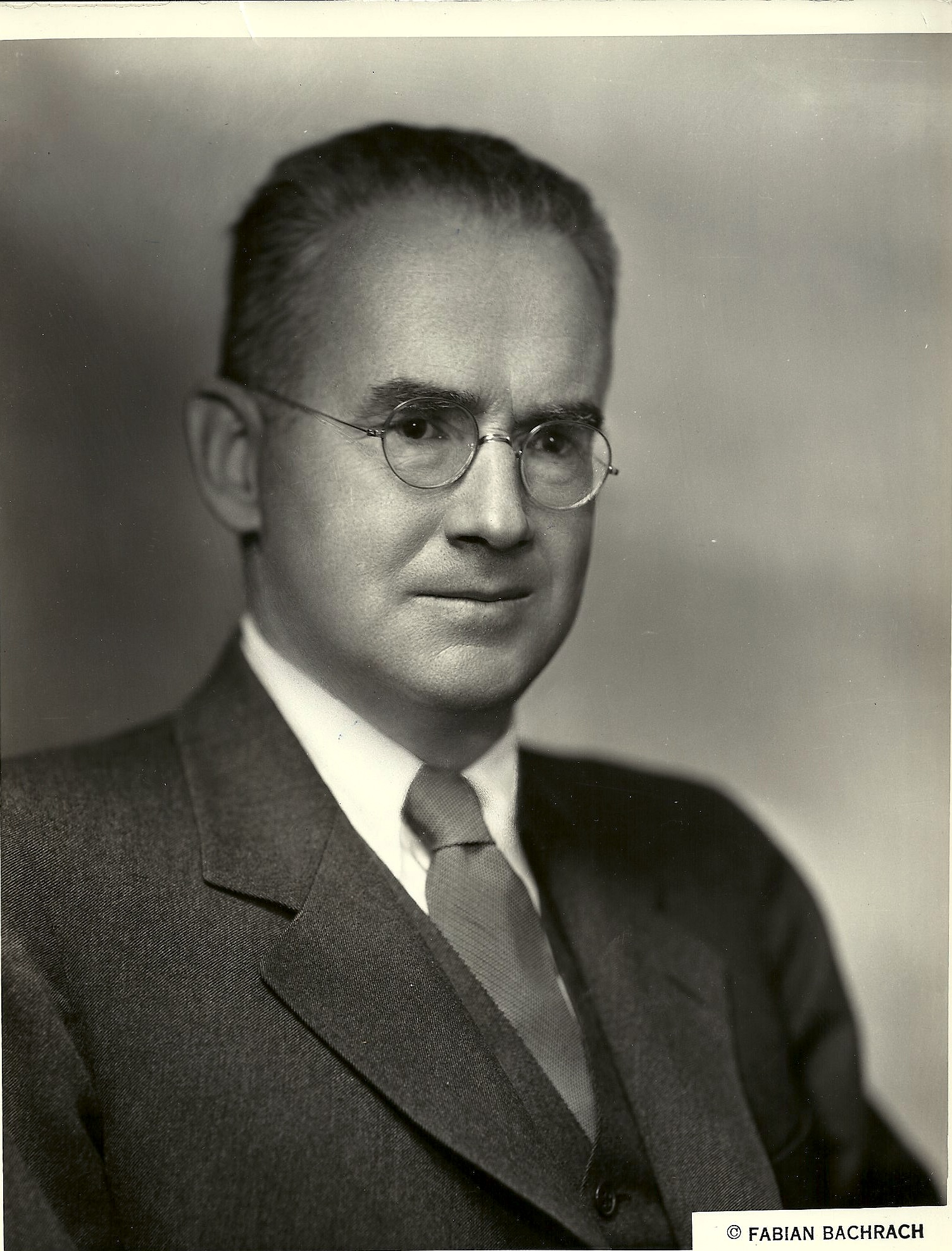
- Born: December 27, 1891; Everett, Massachusetts
- Died: January 20, 1949 (aged 57); Hartford, Connecticut
- Citizenship: U.S.
- Occupations: Engineer, entrepreneur, executive, director, public servant
- Years active: 1915–1949
- Known for: Aircraft engineer and executive of Pratt & Whitney and United Aircraft; president of NACA
- Notable work: Innovator and lead developer of the Pratt & Whitney Wasp series; as head of the aeronautical section of the National Defense Advisory Commission, Mead helped the U.S. to maximize its aircraft production for World War II
- Spouse: Cary Hoge Mead [wrote a biography of her husband]

George Jackson Mead (December 27, 1891 Everett, Massachusetts – January 20, 1949 Hartford, Connecticut) was an American aircraft engineer. He is best known as one of the chief founding team members, together with Frederick Rentschler, of Pratt & Whitney Aircraft. Mead and Rentschler left Wright Aeronautical with the plan to start their own aviation-related business; they founded Pratt & Whitney Aircraft in July 1925. Their first project was to build a new, large, air-cooled, radial aircraft engine of Mead's design, which soon came to be named the Wasp. The first Wasp model was the R-1340, and a large series of Wasp models and Hornet models followed. Mead, as Vice President of Engineering, was the head of engineering for Pratt & Whitney from 1925 to 1935. He later left Pratt & Whitney and its parent United Aircraft. He served as the president of the U.S. National Advisory Committee for Aeronautics (NACA), and he served as head of the aeronautical section of the National Defense Advisory Commission during World War II, as a manager in the U.S. government's war materiel production effort.

== Early life ==
Mead was born in Everett, Massachusetts on December 27, 1891, to Dr. George Nathaniel Plumer Mead and Jennie Henrietta Mathilda LeMann Mead.

He graduated from the Choate School in Wallingford, Connecticut in 1911 and attended the Massachusetts Institute of Technology, but left in 1915 without graduating, owing to health problems.

== Career ==
Mead worked for well over a year at Sterling Engine Company of Buffalo, NY. His next job was with the Simplex Automobile Company of New Brunswick, NJ, builders of the Crane-Simplex automobile. Simplex later merged with the Wright-Martin Aeronautical Corporation where Mead was in charge of the experimental division of the engineering department. In 1919 he became chief engineer of what was now the Wright Aeronautical Corporation upon the resignation of Henry Crane.

In late 1924, internal disagreements at Wright resulted in the resignation of President Frederick Rentschler. In 1925, Rentschler obtained financing to start Pratt & Whitney Aircraft Corporation in the existing factory of the Pratt & Whitney Tool Company in Hartford, Connecticut, and Mead left Wright Aeronautical to join Rentschler as the Vice President of Engineering.

At Pratt & Whitney Aircraft, Mead led the development program for their first engine, completed on Christmas Eve, 1925. The 425 hp (317 kW) R-1340 Wasp easily passed its official qualification test in March 1926, and the Navy ordered 200 engines. The speed, climb, performance, and reliability that the engine offered revolutionized American aviation. Subsequently, he led the development programs of the more powerful R-1690 Hornet and several other series of air-cooled radial aircraft engines.

In 1929, Pratt & Whitney Aircraft was merged with a number of other aviation-related corporations, including Boeing, Sikorsky, and Vought, as part of the new United Aircraft and Transport Corporation (UATC). Pratt & Whitney became a subsidiary.

In 1930, Rentschler made a difficult decision about which engines to use for the Boeing 247. Mead insisted on the larger, more powerful Hornets; the pilots of United Airlines insisted on the less powerful Wasps. Fernandez says, "When Rentschler stood by the pilots, Mead took the decision personally. […] He agreed to try to develop a Wasp [capable] of powering the smaller version of his transport plane, but he never forgot the insult. He knew he was right, and within a year so did the rest of the United States."

In 1934, the Air Mail scandal led to the breakup of UATC. Pratt & Whitney, along with UATC's other manufacturing interests east of the Mississippi River, became United Aircraft, with Rentschler as president. Rentschler decided to turn over the presidency of Pratt & Whitney to a subordinate as he concentrated on leading the parent corporation. Mead and Donald Brown were his two choices for his successor, but Mead did not want the job, and he refused to cooperate with Brown, who became the new president. Brown appointed Leonard S. Hobbs as engineering manager for Pratt & Whitney, and Mead stayed on as an engineer reporting to Hobbs. It was not so much a demotion as a growing of distance and independence from United Aircraft. Mead was still a person of high authority at United Aircraft, but something like an officer who resigns his commission. He began to act something like a consultant or engineer emeritus, setting up a design office in his home and not coming to the headquarters as often.

By 1939, Mead's policy disagreements with Rentschler had become so great that he declined reelection to United Aircraft's board of directors. In October 1939, he was appointed by President Franklin D Roosevelt to the U.S. National Advisory Committee for Aeronautics, a federal research agency which later evolved into NASA.

In 1940, even though the United States had not yet entered World War II, a massive military buildup was underway. In May 1940, President Roosevelt called for development of the industrial capacity to produce 50,000 airplanes per year (almost thirty times the total US aircraft production in 1938). The responsibility for overseeing this daunting task fell to Mead whom Roosevelt, acting on William S. Knudsen's recommendation, appointed head of the aeronautical section of the National Defense Advisory Commission. Mead sold his United Aircraft stock to avoid conflict of interest in his new government procurement position. He was now completely severed from his long tenure at United Aircraft and its predecessors.

Fernandez describes the war years that followed as Knudsen and Mead, now materiel production czars for the U.S. government, interacted with Rentschler and Eugene Wilson of United. United, which lacked plant capacity to satisfy the demand, licensed manufacturing of many of its designs to the automakers in Detroit.

== Awards ==
In January 1940, Mead received the Reed award for outstanding achievement in aviation.

In 1946, Mead was presented the Medal for Merit for his efforts in the development and production of aircraft engines used in World War II.
