= Renschler =

Renschler is a surname. Notable people with the surname include:

- Andreas Renschler (born 1958), German engineer
- Beate Renschler (born 1958), German gymnast
- Hans Renschler (1925–2011), German scientist
- Helmut Renschler, German military veteran

== See also ==
- Rentschler
