= Hartford Steam Boiler Inspection and Insurance Company =

Global specialty insurer and reinsurer

Hartford Steam Boiler

- Headquarters in Hartford, CT (2026)
- Type: Subsidiary
- Industry: Insurance
- Founded: June 30, 1866; 160 years ago
- Headquarters: Hartford, Connecticut
- Area served: United States
- Products: Equipment insurance, Inspection services
- Owner: Munich Re
- Subsidiaries: Boiler Inspection & Insurance Company of Canada and HSB Engineering Insurance Limited of the U.K.
- Website: munichre.com/HSB/

The Hartford Steam Boiler Inspection and Insurance Company (HSB) is a global specialty insurer and reinsurer headquartered in Hartford, Connecticut. It was founded in 1866 and is the largest provider of equipment breakdown insurance and related inspection services in North America serving over five million commercial locations.

HSB subsidiaries include the Boiler Inspection and Insurance Company of Canada (BI&I), which is the largest insurer of equipment breakdown insurance in Canada, and HSB Engineering Insurance Limited of the U.K., which provides engineered lines coverages and inspection services to clients in the U.K., Ireland and other EU countries.

HSB is part of Munich Re, one of the world’s largest reinsurers. Munich Re completed its acquisition of HSB in April 2009.

Hartford Steam Boiler Group is rated A++ (Superior) by A.M. Best Company. On July 24, 2019, A.M. Best Co. affirmed the ratings of the Hartford Steam Boiler group and its member companies.

Hartford Steam Boiler (U.S.) provides equipment breakdown coverage through a network of brokers and agents and also through other insurance companies who partner with HSB and who include equipment breakdown as part of their insurance products for commercial lines and personal lines customers.

Equipment breakdown insurance, also known as “boiler and machinery,” covers physical and financial damage that results from an accidental equipment breakdown to a range of equipment, machinery and technology. Standard property coverages typically exclude perils of mechanical and electrical breakdown. Equipment breakdown coverage was originally designed for business and industry. In recent years, HSB has extended the product concept to the farm owners and homeowners markets.

The company also provides a range of other specialty insurance products including insurance for identity recovery, data compromise, employment practices liability and miscellaneous professional liability that it designs and distributes through other insurance companies in reinsurance service agreements.

Hartford Steam Boiler employs over 1,200 engineers, inspectors and technicians, which account for approximately 50 percent of its total workforce.

In March 2020, HSB announced a new logo and brand. The new autonomous HSB brand brings together HSB's three largest businesses - Hartford Steam Boiler in the US, the Boiler Inspection and Insurance Company of Canada (BI&I), and HSB Engineering Insurance in the UK - under one banner.

== Early history ==
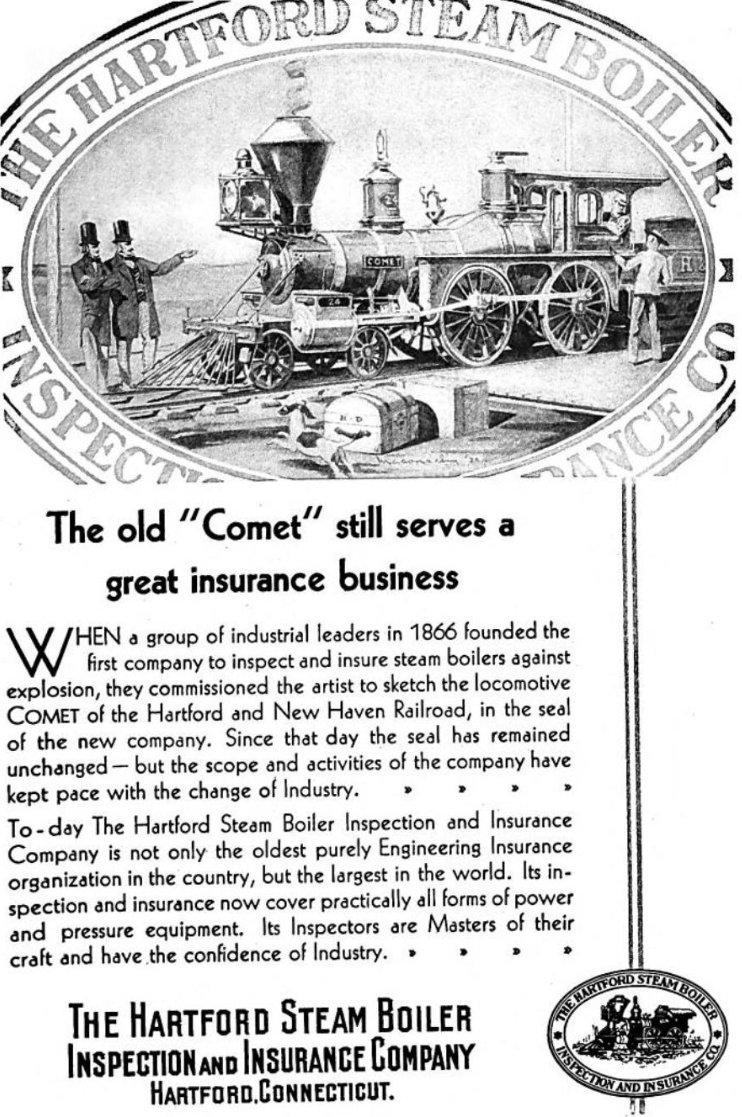
A 1931 advertisement for the company featuring the Comet of the Hartford and New Haven Railroad, which served as the company's logo for many years.

The Hartford Steam Boiler Inspection and Insurance Company was founded on June 30, 1866. The company was conceived at a time when catastrophic boiler explosions were common events, occurring about once every four days.

=== Steam Power and the Industrial Revolution ===
Up until the 1850s in the United States, a great deal of manufacturing was carried on by small plants located in rural areas. Water from streams and rivers was the source of power for equipment. However, water power had reached the limits of its industrial capacity. Manufacturers turned to steam boilers and engines. The industrial revolution was underway.

The advent of steam power created a new industrial hazard – disastrous boiler explosions. These tragedies occurred with increasing frequency with loss of life and property. Though the potential of steam power seemed infinite, controlling the power and safely harnessing it was crudely developed. As applications for steam power became more complex, the dangers became more acute. In the fall of 1857, a group of young men interested in science and mechanics formed the Polytechnic Club of Hartford. Its original members were E.K. Root (Colt Foreman), E.M. Reed, H. Lord, C.B. Richards, C.F Howard, J.M. Allen, F.A. Pratt, A. Whitney, J.L. Blanchard, and J.A. Ayres. They discussed articles on Science and Mechanics. They proposed the "Guaranteed Steam Boiler Inspection," and with it, offered a guarantee against loss and property damage. The club was disbanded because of the Civil War and lack of interest. The idea was resurrected in 1866 under the direction of R.W. Jarvis (Colt Manager), C.M. Beach, G. Crompton, and H.H. Hayden Esq. The State of Connecticut granted a charter for Corporation in May 1866, and the Corporation was organized in November 1866 with E.C. Roberts as its first president. Soon after, Roberts stepped down, and J.M. Allen became its second president. In 1919, the Hartford Steam Boiler Insurance and Inspection Company got tired of paying the claims on all those broken boilers, so they came up with the idea of this special piping configuration and mandated it for anyone who wanted insurance on their steam boiler. Before long, everyone was calling it the Hartford (or Underwriters) Loop. The Loop had a very positive impact on the industry, according to the records of boiler failures before and after 1919.

=== Polytechnic Club Addresses Issue of Boiler Explosions ===
During this time, a group of industrialists and business leaders in Hartford, Connecticut, formed a group to discuss technical and scientific issues of the day. This group, the Polytechnic Club, included Francis A. Pratt and Amos Whitney the founders of the Pratt & Whitney, and Elisha Root, president of Colt’s Patent Firearms Manufacturing Co., among others.

One of the founders of the Polytechnic Club was Jeremiah M. Allen, who would become president of The Hartford Steam Boiler Inspection and Insurance Company and the principal American figure to develop and apply the principle of combining boiler inspections with insurance.
