= P&W =

P&W may refer to:

- Passion and Warfare – an album by Steve Vai
- Philadelphia and Western Railroad
- Poets & Writers – a nonprofit literary organization
- Portland and Western Railroad
- Pratt & Whitney – an aircraft engine manufacturer
- Pratt & Whitney Measurement Systems – a maker of metrological equipment
- Providence and Worcester Railroad
