= Pratt & Whitney (disambiguation) =

Pratt & Whitney is a manufacturer of aircraft engines

Pratt & Whitney may also refer to:

- Pratt & Whitney Canada, a manufacturer of small turboprops and turbofans
- Pratt & Whitney Measurement Systems, formerly Pratt & Whitney Machine Tool Company; currently a manufacturer of high-precision measuring instruments and systems
- Pratt & Whitney Rocketdyne, a former manufacturer of rocket engines, now Aerojet Rocketdyne
- Pratt & Whitney Stadium at Rentschler Field, a football stadium in East Hartford, Connecticut primarily used by the University of Connecticut
