= Rentschler =

Rentschler is a surname. Notable people with the surname include:

- Carrie Rentschler, academician in Feminist studies, scholar, writer, associate professor at McGill University, Montreal, Quebec, Canada
- Frederick Rentschler (1887–1956), American aircraft engine designer, aviation engineer, and industrialist
- Gordon S. Rentschler (1885–1948), American businessman, a chairman of First National City Bank, a predecessor of Citigroup
- Harvey C. Rentschler (1880–1949), American physicist, inventor, and research direct at Westinghouse Lamp Plant
- Jack Gilbert Rentschler (born 1931), American politician, member of the South Dakota House of Representatives
- Thomas Rentschler (1932–2016), American politician, member of the Ohio House of Representatives

== Other ==
- Rentschler (company), German company

== See also ==
- Garver-Rentschler Barn, a registered historic building in Hamilton, Ohio, United States
- Rentschler Farm Museum, a historic site near downtown Saline, Michigan
- Rentschler Field, an airport in East Hartford, Connecticut in use from 1933 to 1999
- Rentschler Heliport, a private heliport for the exclusive use of United Technologies Corporation, located southeast of East Hartford, Connecticut
- Rentschler House, a historic residence in the city of Hamilton, Ohio, United States
- Hooven-Owens-Rentschler, American manufacturer of steam and diesel engines in Hamilton, Ohio, also known as H.O.R.
- Pratt & Whitney Stadium at Rentschler Field, a sports stadium in East Hartford, Connecticut
