= Blood sugar level =

Concentration of glucose present in the blood (Glycaemia)

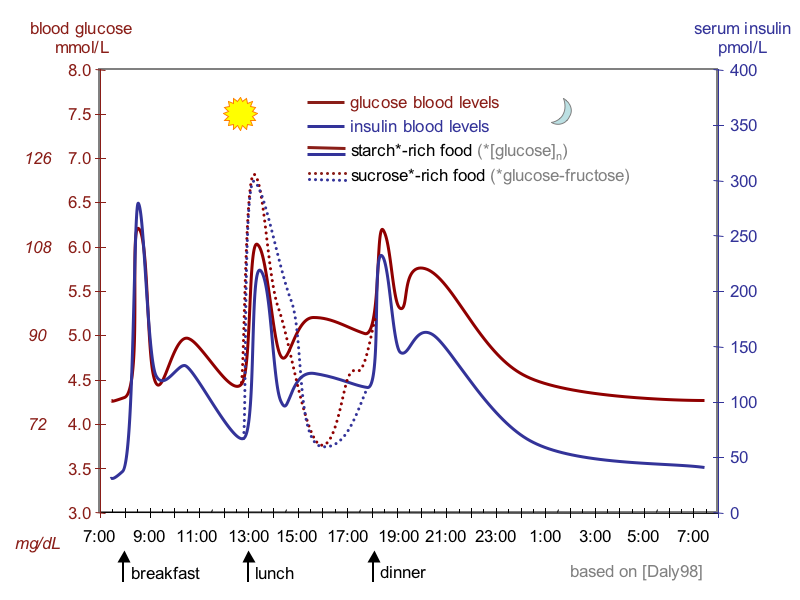
The fluctuation of blood sugar (red) and the sugar-lowering hormone insulin (blue) in humans during the course of a day with three meals. One of the effects of a sugar-rich vs a starch-rich meal is highlighted.

The blood sugar level, blood sugar concentration, blood glucose level, or glycemia is the measure of glucose concentrated in the blood. The body tightly regulates blood glucose levels as a part of metabolic homeostasis.

For a 70 kg (154 lb) human, approximately four grams of dissolved glucose (also called "blood glucose") is maintained in the blood plasma at all times. Glucose that is not circulating in the blood is stored in skeletal muscle and liver cells in the form of glycogen; in fasting individuals, blood glucose is maintained at a constant level by releasing just enough glucose from these glycogen stores in the liver and skeletal muscle in order to maintain homeostasis. Glucose can be transported from the intestines or liver to other tissues in the body via the bloodstream. Cellular glucose uptake is primarily regulated by insulin, a hormone produced in the pancreas. Once inside the cell, the glucose can now act as an energy source as it undergoes the process of glycolysis.

In humans, properly maintained glucose levels are necessary for normal function in a number of tissues, including the human brain, which consumes approximately 60% of blood glucose in fasting, sedentary individuals. A persistent elevation in blood glucose leads to glucose toxicity, which contributes to cell dysfunction and the pathology grouped together as complications of diabetes.

Glucose levels are usually lowest in the morning, before the first meal of the day, and rise after meals for an hour or two by a few millimoles per litre.

Abnormal persistently high glycemia is referred to as hyperglycemia; low levels are referred to as hypoglycemia. Diabetes mellitus is characterized by persistent hyperglycemia from a variety of causes, and it is the most prominent disease related to the failure of blood sugar regulation. Diabetes mellitus is also characterized by frequent episodes of low sugar, or hypoglycemia. There are different methods of testing and measuring blood sugar levels.

Drinking alcohol causes an initial surge in blood sugar and later tends to cause levels to fall. Also, certain drugs can increase or decrease glucose levels.

== Units of measurement ==
In the United Kingdom and Commonwealth countries (Australia, Canada, India, etc.) and ex-USSR countries, blood glucose measurements are expressed in molar concentration mmol/L abbreviated mM. In the United States, Germany, Japan and many other countries, they are expressed in mass concentration using mg/dL (milligrams per decilitre).

=== Conversion ===
The conversion factor between millimoles per liter (mmol/L) and milligrams per deciliter (mg/dL) is determined by the molar mass.

For glucose, the molar mass is approximately 180.156 g/mol, yielding the common clinical constants:

$\text{mg/dL} = \text{mmol/L} \times 18.016$

$\text{mmol/L} = \frac{\text{mg/dL}}{18.016}$

== Normal value range ==
=== Humans ===
Normal blood glucose level (tested while fasting) for non-diabetics should be 3.9–5.5 mmol/L (70–100 mg/dL).

According to the American Diabetes Association, the fasting blood glucose target range for diabetics should be 3.9–7.2 mmol/L (70–130 mg/dL) and less than 10 mmol/L (180 mg/dL) two hours after meals (as measured by a blood glucose monitor).

Normal value ranges may vary slightly between laboratories. Glucose homeostasis, when operating normally, restores the blood sugar level to a narrow range of about 4.4 to 6.1 mmol/L (79 to 110 mg/dL) (as measured by a fasting blood glucose test).

The global mean fasting plasma blood glucose level in humans is about 5.5 mmol/L (100 mg/dL); however, this level fluctuates throughout the day. Blood sugar levels for those without diabetes and who are not fasting is usually below 6.9 mmol/L (125 mg/dL).

Despite widely variable intervals between meals or the occasional consumption of meals with a substantial carbohydrate load, human blood glucose levels tend to remain within the normal range. However, shortly after eating, the blood glucose level may rise, in non-diabetics, temporarily up to 7.8 mmol/L (140 mg/dL) or slightly more.

The actual amount of glucose in the blood and body fluids is very small. In a healthy adult male of 75 kg (165 lb) with a blood volume of 5 L, a blood glucose level of 5.5 mmol/L (100 mg/dL) amounts to 5 g, equivalent to about a teaspoonful of sugar. Part of the reason why this amount is so small is that, to maintain an influx of glucose into cells, enzymes modify glucose by adding phosphate or other groups to it.

=== Other animals ===
In general, ranges of blood sugar in common domestic ruminants are lower than in many monogastric mammals. However this generalization does not extend to wild ruminants or camelids. For serum glucose in mg/dL, reference ranges of 42 to 75 for cows, 44 to 81 for sheep, and 48 to 76 for goats, but 61 to 124 for cats; 62 to 108 for dogs, 62 to 114 for horses, 66 to 116 for pigs, 75 to 155 for rabbits, and 90 to 140 for llamas have been reported. A 90 percent reference interval for serum glucose of 26 to 181 mg/dL has been reported for captured mountain goats (Oreamnos americanus), where no effects of the pursuit and capture on measured levels were evident. For beluga whales, the 25–75 percent range for serum glucose has been estimated to be 94 to 115 mg/dL. For the white rhinoceros, one study has indicated that the 95 percent range is 28 to 140 mg/dL. For harp seals, a serum glucose range of 4.9 to 12.1 mmol/L [i.e., 88 to 218 mg/dL] has been reported; for hooded seals, a range of 7.5 to 15.7 mmol/L [i.e., about 135 to 283 mg/dL] has been reported.

== Regulation ==
The body's homeostatic mechanism keeps blood glucose levels within a narrow range. It is composed of several interacting systems, of which hormone regulation is the most important.

There are two types of mutually antagonistic metabolic pathways affecting blood glucose levels:

- catabolic hormones (such as glucagon, cortisol and catecholamines) which increase blood glucose;
- and one anabolic hormone (insulin), which decreases blood glucose, as well as a mechanism mediated by the enzyme AMPK following skeletal muscle activity.

These hormones are secreted from pancreatic islets (bundles of endocrine tissues), of which there are four types: alpha (A) cells, beta (B) cells, Delta (D) cells and F cells. Glucagon is secreted from alpha cells, while insulin is secreted by beta cells. Together they regulate the blood-glucose levels through negative feedback, a process where the end product of one reaction stimulates the beginning of another reaction. In blood-glucose levels, insulin lowers the concentration of glucose in the blood. The lower blood-glucose level (a product of the insulin secretion) triggers glucagon to be secreted, and repeats the cycle.

In order for blood glucose to be kept stable, modifications to insulin, glucagon, epinephrine and cortisol are made. Each of these hormones has a different responsibility to keep blood glucose regulated; when blood sugar is too high, insulin tells muscles to take up excess glucose for storage in the form of glycogen. Glucagon responds to too low of a blood glucose level; it informs the tissue to release some glucose from the glycogen stores. Epinephrine prepares the muscles and respiratory system for activity in the case of a "fight or flight" response. Lastly, cortisol supplies the body with fuel in times of heavy stress.

== Abnormalities ==
=== High blood sugar ===
If blood sugar levels remain too high (exceeding 6.9 mmol/L or 124 mg/dL) the body suppresses appetite over the short term. Long-term hyperglycemia causes many health problems including heart disease, cancer, eye, kidney, and nerve damage.

Blood sugar levels above 16.7 mmol/L (300 mg/dL) can cause fatal reactions. Ketones will be very high (a magnitude higher than when eating a very low carbohydrate diet) initiating ketoacidosis. The ADA (American Diabetes Association) recommends seeing a doctor if blood glucose reaches 13.3 mmol/L (240 mg/dL), and it is recommended to seek emergency treatment at 15 mmol/L (270 mg/dL) blood glucose if ketones are present. The most common cause of hyperglycemia is diabetes. When diabetes is the cause, physicians typically recommend an anti-diabetic medication as treatment. From the perspective of the majority of patients, treatment with an old, well-understood diabetes drug such as metformin will be the safest, most effective, least expensive, and most comfortable route to managing the condition. Treatment will vary for the distinct forms of Diabetes and can differ from person to person based on how they are reacting to treatment. Diet changes and exercise implementation may also be part of a treatment plan for diabetes.

Some medications may cause a rise in blood sugars of diabetics, such as steroid medications, including cortisone, hydrocortisone, prednisolone, prednisone, and dexamethasone.

=== Low blood sugar ===
When the blood sugar level is below 70 mg/dL (3.9 mmol/L), this is referred to as having low blood sugar. Low blood sugar is very frequent among type 1 diabetics. There are several causes of low blood sugar, including, taking an excessive amount of insulin, not consuming enough carbohydrates, drinking alcohol, spending time at a high elevation, puberty, and menstruation. If blood sugar levels drop too low, a potentially fatal condition called hypoglycemia develops. Symptoms may include lethargy, impaired mental functioning; irritability; shaking, twitching, weakness in arm and leg muscles; pale complexion; sweating; loss of consciousness.

Mechanisms that restore satisfactory blood glucose levels after extreme hypoglycemia (below 2.2 mmol/L or 40 mg/dL) must be quick and effective to prevent extremely serious consequences of insufficient glucose: confusion or unsteadiness and, in the extreme (below 0.8 mmol/L or 15 mg/dL) loss of consciousness and seizures. Without discounting the potentially quite serious conditions and risks due to or oftentimes accompanying hyperglycemia, especially in the long-term (diabetes or pre-diabetes, obesity or overweight, hyperlipidemia, hypertension, etc.), it is still generally more dangerous to have too little glucose – especially if levels are very low – in the blood than too much, at least temporarily, because glucose is so important for metabolism and nutrition and the proper functioning of the body's organs. This is especially the case for those organs that are metabolically active or that require a constant, regulated supply of blood sugar (the liver and brain are examples). Symptomatic hypoglycemia is most likely associated with diabetes and liver disease (especially overnight or postprandial), without treatment or with wrong treatment, possibly in combination with carbohydrate malabsorption, physical over-exertion or drugs. Many other less likely illnesses, like cancer, could also be a reason. Starvation, possibly due to eating disorders, like anorexia, will also eventually lead to hypoglycemia. Hypoglycemic episodes can vary greatly between persons and from time to time, both in severity and swiftness of onset. For severe cases, prompt medical assistance is essential, as damage to brain and other tissues and even death will result from sufficiently low blood-glucose levels.

== Glucose measurement ==
In the past to measure blood glucose it was necessary to take a blood sample, as explained below, but since 2015 it has also been possible to use a continuous glucose monitor, which involves an electrode placed under the skin. Both methods, as of 2023, cost hundreds of dollars or euros per year for supplies needed.

=== Sample source ===
Glucose testing in a fasting individual shows comparable levels of glucose in arterial, venous, and capillary blood. But following meals, capillary and arterial blood glucose levels can be significantly higher than venous levels. Although these differences vary widely, one study found that following the consumption of 50 grams of glucose, "the mean capillary blood glucose concentration is higher than the mean venous blood glucose concentration by 35%."

=== Sample type ===
Glucose is measured in whole blood, plasma or serum. Historically, blood glucose values were given in terms of whole blood, but most laboratories now measure and report plasma or serum glucose levels. Because red blood cells (erythrocytes) have a higher concentration of protein (e.g., hemoglobin) than serum, serum has a higher water content and consequently more dissolved glucose than does whole blood. To convert from whole-blood glucose, multiplication by 1.14 has been shown to generally give the serum/plasma level.

To prevent contamination of the sample with intravenous fluids, particular care should be given to drawing blood samples from the arm opposite the one in which an intravenous line is inserted. Alternatively, blood can be drawn from the same arm with an IV line after the IV has been turned off for at least 5 minutes, and the arm has been elevated to drain infused fluids away from the vein. Inattention can lead to large errors, since as little as 10% contamination with a 5% glucose solution (D5W) will elevate glucose in a sample by 500 mg/dL or more. The actual concentration of glucose in blood is very low, even in the hyperglycemic.

=== Measurement techniques ===
Two major methods have been used to measure glucose. The first, still in use in some places, is a chemical method exploiting the nonspecific reducing property of glucose in a reaction with an indicator substance that changes color when reduced. Since other blood compounds also have reducing properties (e.g., urea, which can be abnormally high in uremic patients), this technique can produce erroneous readings in some situations (5–15 mg/dL has been reported). The more recent technique, using enzymes specific to glucose, is less susceptible to this kind of error. The two most common employed enzymes are glucose oxidase and hexokinase. Average blood glucose concentrations can also be measured. This method measures the level of glycated hemoglobin, which is representative of the average blood glucose levels over the last, approximately, 120 days.

In either case, the chemical system is commonly contained on a test strip which is inserted into a meter, and then has a blood sample applied. Test-strip shapes and their exact chemical composition vary between meter systems and cannot be interchanged. Formerly, some test strips were read (after timing and wiping away the blood sample) by visual comparison against a color chart printed on the vial label. Strips of this type are still used for urine glucose readings, but for blood glucose levels they are obsolete. Their error rates were, in any case, much higher. Errors when using test strips were often caused by the age of the strip or exposure to high temperatures or humidity. More precise blood glucose measurements are performed in a medical laboratory, using hexokinase, glucose oxidase, or glucose dehydrogenase enzymes.

Urine glucose readings, however taken, are much less useful. In properly functioning kidneys, glucose does not appear in urine until the renal threshold for glucose has been exceeded. This is substantially above any normal glucose level, and is evidence of an existing severe hyperglycemic condition. However, as urine is stored in the bladder, any glucose in it might have been produced at any time since the last time the bladder was emptied. Since metabolic conditions change rapidly, as a result of any of several factors, this is delayed news and gives no warning of a developing condition. Blood glucose monitoring is far preferable, both clinically and for home monitoring by patients. Healthy urine glucose levels were first standardized and published in 1965 by Hans Renschler.

A noninvasive method of sampling to monitor glucose levels has emerged using an exhaled breath condensate. However this method does need highly sensitive glucose biosensors.

I. Chemical methods
A. Oxidation-reduction reaction
$\mathrm{Glucose} + \mathrm{Alkaline\ copper\ tartarate}\xrightarrow{\mathrm{Reduction}} \mathrm{Cuprous\ oxide}$
1. Alkaline copper reduction
Folin-Wu method	$\mathrm{Cu}^{2+} + \mathrm{Phosphomolybdic\ acid}\xrightarrow{\mathrm{Oxidation}} \mathrm{Phosphomolybdenum\ oxide}$	Blue end-product
Benedict's method	Modification of Folin–Wu method for qualitative urine glucose.	
Nelson–Somogyi method	$\mathrm{Cu}^{2+} + \mathrm{Arsenomolybdic\ acid}\xrightarrow{\mathrm{Oxidation}} \mathrm{Arsenomolybdenum\ oxide}$	Blue end-product.
Neocuproine method	$\mathrm{Cu}^{2+} + \mathrm{Neocuproine}\xrightarrow{\mathrm{Oxidation}} \mathrm{Cu}^{2+} \mathrm{neocuproine\ complex}$*	Yellow-orange color neocuproine
Shaeffer–Hartmann–Somogyi	Uses the principle of iodine reaction with cuprous byproduct.; Excess I_{2} is then titrated with thiosulfate.	
2. Alkaline Ferricyanide reduction
Hagedorn–Jensen	$\mathrm{Glucose} + \mathrm{Alkaline\ ferricyanide}\longrightarrow \mathrm{Ferrocyanide}$	Colorless end product; other reducing substances interfere with reaction.
B. Condensation
Ortho-toluidine method	Uses aromatic amines and hot acetic acid.; Forms glycosylamine and Schiff's base which is emerald green in color.; This is the most specific method, but the reagent used is toxic.	
Anthrone (phenols) method	Forms hydroxymethyl furfural in hot acetic acid	
II. Enzymatic methods
A. Glucose oxidase
$\mathrm{Glucose} + \mathrm{O}_{2}\xrightarrow[\mathrm{Oxidation}] {\mathrm{glucose\ oxidase}}\textrm{D-glucono-1,5-lactone} + \mathrm{H_{2}O_{2}}$
Saifer–Gerstenfeld method	$\mathrm{H_{2}O_2} + \textit{O}\text{-dianisidine}\xrightarrow[\mathrm{Oxidation}] {\mathrm{peroxidase}} \mathrm{H_2O} + \mathrm{oxidized\ chromogen}$	Inhibited by reducing substances like BUA, bilirubin, glutathione, ascorbic acid.
Trinder method	Uses 4-aminophenazone oxidatively coupled with phenol.; Subject to less interference by increases serum levels of creatinine, uric acid or hemoglobin.; Inhibited by catalase.	
Kodak Ektachem	A dry chemistry method.; Uses spectrophotometry to measure the intensity of color through a lower transparent film.	
Glucometer	Home monitoring blood glucose assay method.; Uses a strip impregnated with a glucose oxidase reagent.	
B. Hexokinase
$$\begin{alignat}{2} & \mathrm{Glucose} + \mathrm{ATP}\xrightarrow[\mathrm{Phosphorylation}] {\mathrm{Hexokinase} + \mathrm{Mg}^{2+}} \textrm{G-6PO}_4 + \mathrm{ADP} \\ & \textrm{G-6PO}_4 + \mathrm{NADP}\xrightarrow[\mathrm{Oxidation}] {\textrm{G-6PD}} \textrm{6-Phosphogluconate} + \mathrm{NADPH} + \mathrm{H}^{+} \\ \end{alignat}$$
NADP as cofactor.; NADPH (reduced product) is measured in 340 nm.; More specific than glucose oxidase method due to G-6PO_{4}, which inhibits interfering substances except when sample is hemolyzed.

=== Clinical correlation ===
The fasting blood glucose level, which is measured after a fast of 8 hours, is the most commonly used indication of overall glucose homeostasis, largely because disturbing events such as food intake are avoided. Conditions affecting glucose levels are shown in the table below. Abnormalities in these test results are due to problems in the multiple control mechanism of glucose regulation.

The metabolic response to a carbohydrate challenge is conveniently assessed by a postprandial glucose level drawn 2 hours after a meal or a glucose load. In addition, the glucose tolerance test, consisting of several timed measurements after a standardized amount of oral glucose intake, is used to aid in the diagnosis of diabetes.

Error rates for blood glucose measurements systems vary, depending on laboratories, and on the methods used. Colorimetry techniques can be biased by color changes in test strips (from airborne or finger-borne contamination, perhaps) or interference (e.g., tinting contaminants) with light source or the light sensor. Electrical techniques are less susceptible to these errors, though not to others. In home use, the most important issue is not accuracy, but trend. Thus if a meter / test strip system is consistently wrong by 10%, there will be little consequence, as long as changes (e.g., due to exercise or medication adjustments) are properly tracked. In the US, home use blood test meters must be approved by the federal Food and Drug Administration before they can be sold.

Finally, there are several influences on blood glucose level aside from food intake. Infection, for instance, tends to change blood glucose levels, as does stress either physical or psychological. Exercise, especially if prolonged or long after the most recent meal, will have an effect as well. In the typical person, maintenance of blood glucose at near constant levels will nevertheless be quite effective.

Causes of abnormal glucose levels
Persistent hyperglycemia	Transient hyperglycemia	Persistent hypoglycemia	Transient hypoglycemia
Reference range, fasting blood glucose (FBG): 70–110 mg/dL
Diabetes mellitus	Pheochromocytoma	Insulinoma	Acute alcohol intoxication or ingestion
Adrenal cortical hyperactivity Cushing's syndrome	Severe liver disease	Adrenal cortical insufficiency Addison's disease	Drugs: salicylates, antituberculosis agents
Hyperthyroidism	Acute stress reaction	Hypopituitarism	Severe liver disease
Acromegaly	Shock	Galactosemia	Several glycogen storage diseases
Obesity	Convulsions	Ectopic hormone production from tumors	Hereditary fructose intolerance

== See also ==
- Blood glucose monitoring
- Glycemic index
- Saccharide recognition by boronic acids
