= Westinghouse Lamp Plant =

Coordinates: 40.78137°N 74.19592°W

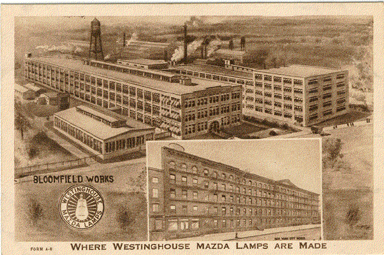
Postcard circa 1905 of Westinghouse plant in Bloomfield, New Jersey that manufactured Mazda lamps

The Westinghouse Lamp Plant located in Bloomfield, New Jersey, was one of the lamp manufacturing plants of Westinghouse Electric Corporation. The plant had a major involvement in supplying uranium metal for the world's first self-sustaining chain reaction in Chicago (Chicago Pile-1) in the early phase of the Manhattan Project to create the first atomic bomb.

== Early years ==
The Westinghouse Lamp Plant was constructed on Arlington Avenue in 1920 near the Watsessing Station of the rail line in the Watsessing neighborhood that connected Montclair, Glen Ridge and Bloomfield. The population in the area had grown since the time that the Township of Bloomfield was incorporated as a township from portions of Newark Township by an act of the New Jersey Legislature on March 23, 1812 until World War II. The population boom was contributed by the manufacturing jobs at the Westinghouse Lamp Plant along with other manufacturing plants such as General Electric, Lehn and Fink and Schering during the war time.

The Westinghouse Lamp Plant was devoted to lamp manufacturing in its early years. The plant had a research department to find a new suitable material for a light bulb filament. After World War I, the department led by Harvey C. Rentschler, and his deputy, John W. Marden, started looking into uranium to discover whether there was any similarity with tungsten to be used as a filament. The problem at the time was to make uranium into a metal form so that researchers could work with it. Westinghouse failed to establish uranium as a viable filament material, however, the research department continued to experiment with it until they found an electrolysis method to use a fused uranium salt to produce a metal. The metal was pure enough for nuclear research in many university laboratories during the 1930s. By 1941, Westinghouse Lamp Plant had the only practical process for producing pure uranium metal.

== Manhattan Project ==
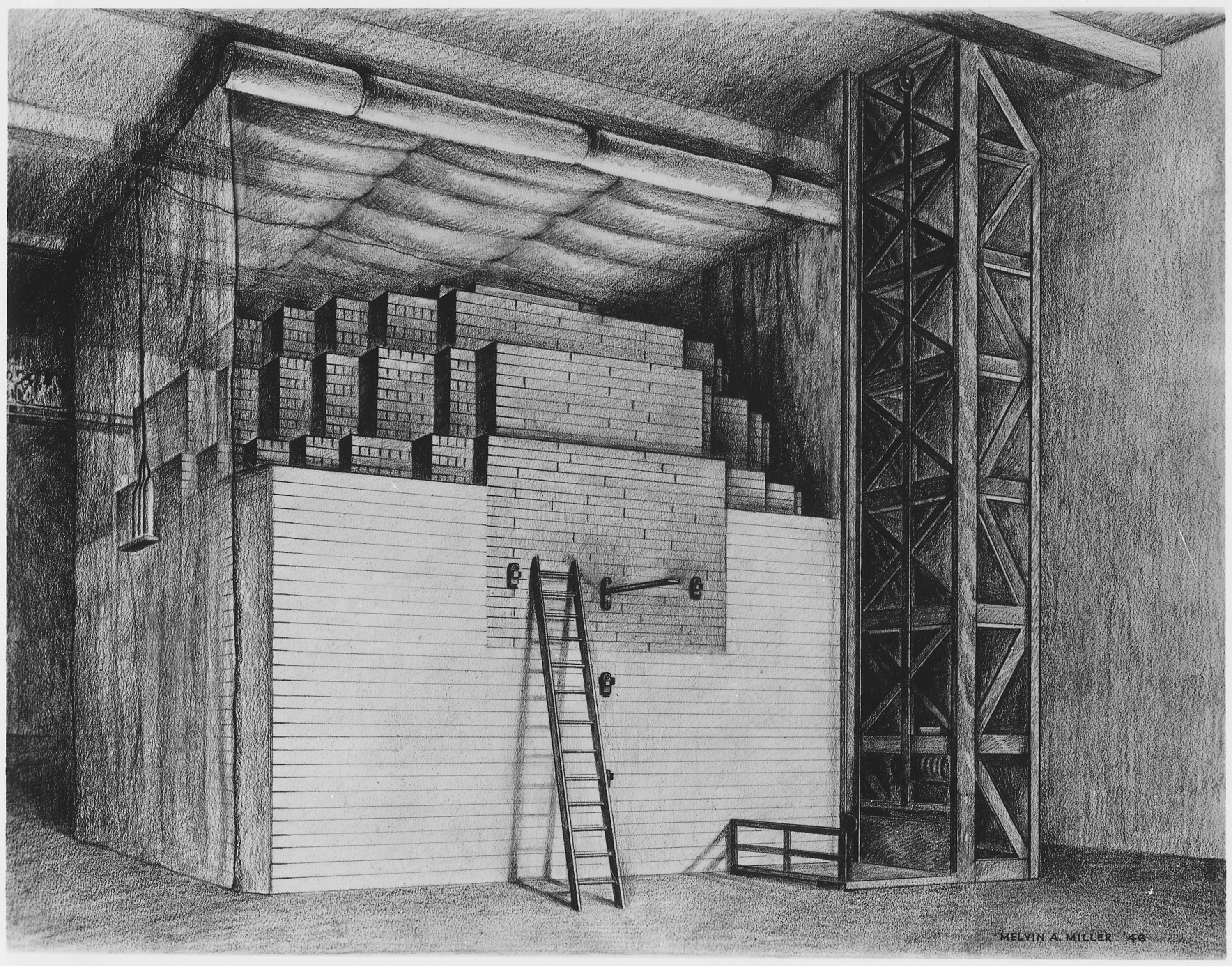
A drawing of the "tuballoy" pile in the middle of Chicago Pile-1 mostly produced by Westinghouse Lamp Plant

In 1942, the Metallurgical Laboratory at the University of Chicago was building the world's first nuclear reactor called Chicago Pile-1 as part of the Manhattan Project. This would have required an enormous number of graphite blocks and uranium pellets. At the time, there was a limited source of pure uranium. Frank Spedding of Iowa State University was able to produce only two short tons of pure uranium. However, a larger quantity of additional uranium metal was required for the pile to go critical.

Around that time, Westinghouse Lamp Plant was able to supply a small amount of pure uranium metal. By 1941, there was an order for the uranium metal of 10 kilograms which was considered an enormous amount. The plant ramped up the production using makeshift equipment including metal garbage cans from a local market to use in the process. The order was fulfilled within a couple of months. By early 1942, there was another order from Arthur H. Compton of the Metallurgical Laboratory for three short tons of the uranium metal for the Chicago Pile-1.

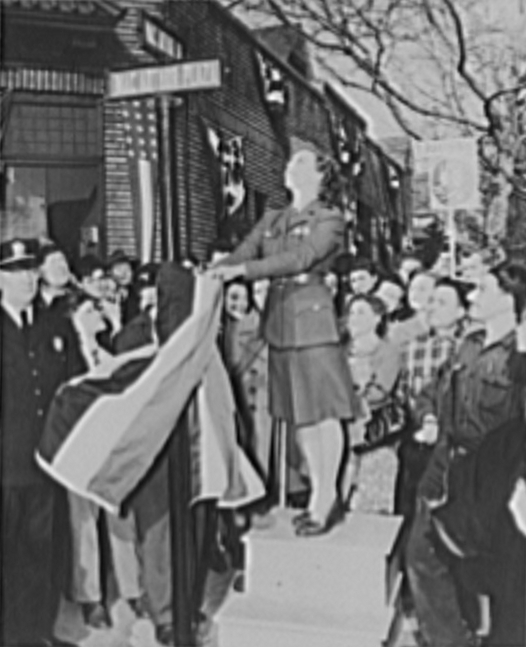
A woman is shown unveiling the new street sign of MacArthur Avenue and MacArthur Plaza.

The project was done in secrecy by not revealing any connection of the work there to the ongoing research on the nuclear reaction. To avoid leaking of information about the project at the plant, it was covered with the program called Tuballoy which was the codename for uranium in programs related to the Manhattan Project, taken from the British atomic weapons effort "Tube Alloys" which had been folded into Manhattan. Due to inadequate equipment and space, the refinement process was done in an ad hoc fashion having some operations done in the basement and some on the roof on a building at the plant. To maintain the confidentiality of the program, many workers who worked on the chemical processes were not familiar with it. Most of them did not know that their work was related to the creation of an atomic weapon.

Although the material and the processes were kept secret, the workers there knew they worked as part of the World War II efforts. They were led to believe that they worked on making conventional bombs. During the height of the production in 1942, there was a war production drive at the plant under the auspices of the labor-management committee to increase its production and warned workers against sabotage. The streets at the plant were renamed to MacArthur Avenue and MacArthur Plaza to promote patriotism.

Finally, the required amount of uranium metal was delivered to Chicago by the Army with containers clearly marked "URANIUM". The Chicago Pile-1 had gone to self-sustaining reaction on December 2, 1942, with the majority of uranium metal from the plant. After that, the plant continued to play a major role in supplying the uranium metal for the Manhattan Project until October 1943 when a better and more economical process was done elsewhere. During the contract, the plant produced 69 short tons of uranium metal in total.

== After the war ==
Westinghouse continued its manufacturing and research at the plant after the war. In 1964, Westinghouse was issued a permit from United States Atomic Energy Commission to conduct research using thorium and uranium to produce thorium-tungsten wire. In 1983, Westinghouse sold its lamp manufacturing operation to North American Phillips Lighting Corporation. The manufacturing of thorium-tungsten wire was continued at the plant until 1984. In 1986, North American Phillips Lighting Corporation returned the control of the plant back to Westinghouse.

== Cleanup efforts ==
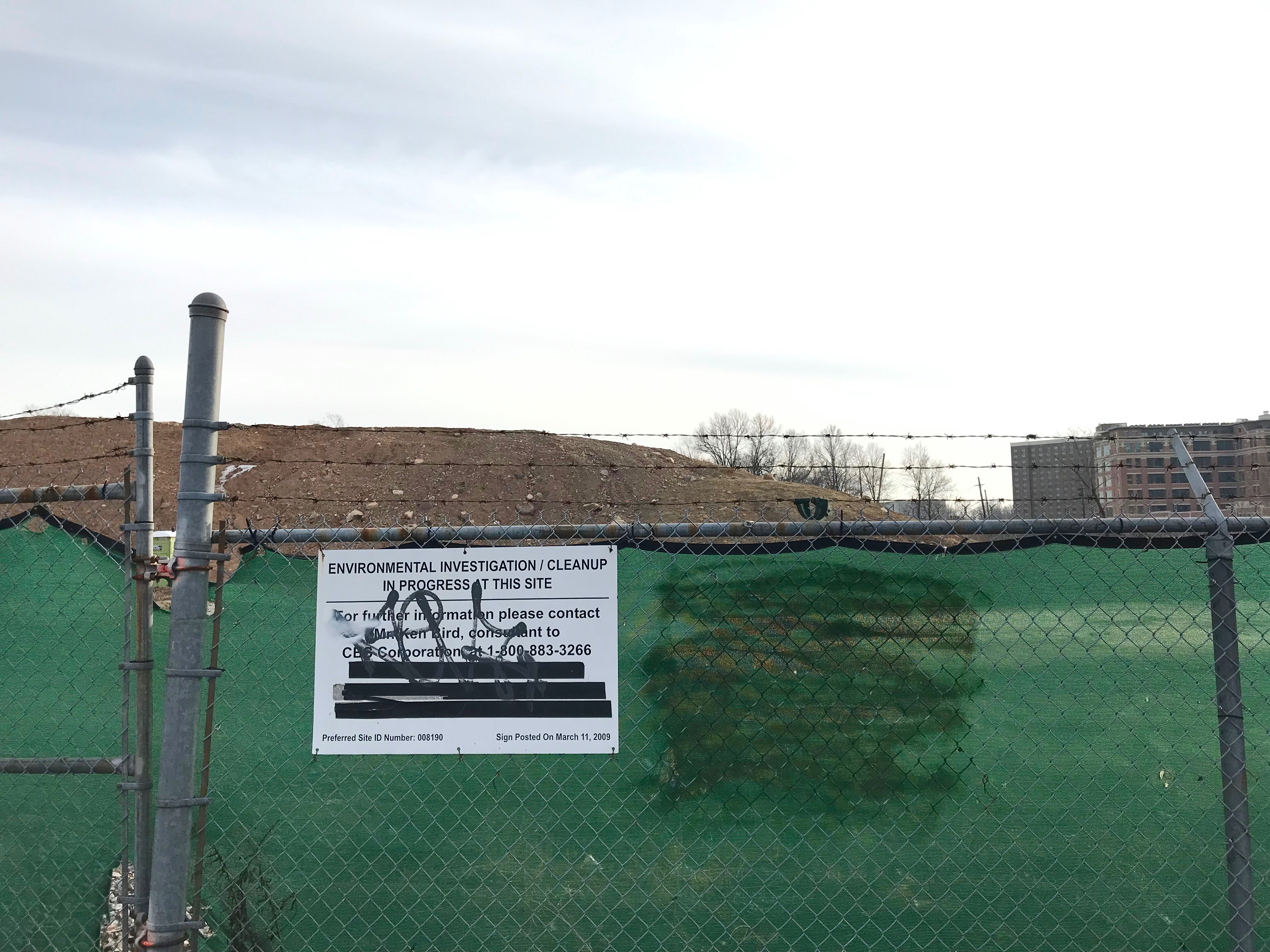
The site cleanup in 2019

The cleanup process started when there was a survey of Manhattan Project sites. The plant was inspected in 1976 and found low levels of radiation. Westinghouse filed an application in 1988 with the Nuclear Regulatory Commission (NRC) to decommission those buildings. The demolition of the buildings was done from 1993 through 2004. During that period, certain radioactive contamination was removed from the site. However, some contaminated areas were covered with asphalt and concrete. The license on the site was terminated by NRC in 2003 so that the site can be released for unrestricted use, although New Jersey Department of Environmental Protection (NJDEP) disagreed with that decision. In 2006, NJDEP sued Viacom (successor of Westinghouse) and others for the continuation of ground water contamination at the site.

== Residential redevelopment ==
Due to the proximity of the Westinghouse site and other former manufacturing sites to the Watsessing Station, the Township of Bloomfield worked on the plan for transit-oriented development in that area. The Westinghouse site, although a brownfield site with ongoing remediation at the time, was re-zoned into Commuter Oriented Residential District which was a mixed-use concept that included high-density residential units which would be close to the train station.

The redevelopment was completed. The luxury apartments were marketed as "The Grove at Watsessing" which was part of the "Grove Crossing" complex.
