= United Aircraft =

American aircraft manufacturer

United Aircraft Corporation
- Industry: Aerospace
- Predecessor: United Aircraft and Transport Corporation
- Founded: September 26, 1934
- Fate: Renamed to United Technologies effective May 1, 1975
- Successor: United Technologies
- Headquarters: Hartford, Connecticut, United States
- Key people: Frederick Rentschler, founder; George J. Mead, senior engineer

The United Aircraft Corporation was an American aircraft manufacturer formed by the break-up of United Aircraft and Transport Corporation in 1934. In 1975, the company became United Technologies, which in 2020 merged with Raytheon to form Raytheon Technologies, later renamed RTX Corporation.

== History ==
=== 1930s ===
The Air Mail scandal of the early 1930s resulted in a rebuilt air mail system, under the Air Mail Act of 1934, in which carriers and their equipment manufacturers (e.g., of airframes and engines) could no longer be owned by the same company. The United Aircraft and Transport Corporation was broken up on September 26, 1934, as a result of this new law. The corporation's airline interests went on to become United Airlines. Its manufacturing interests east of the Mississippi River—Pratt & Whitney, Chance Vought, and Sikorsky—remained together as the new United Aircraft Corporation, headquartered in Hartford with Frederick Rentschler, founder of Pratt & Whitney, as president. (Note: These companies together formed the United Aircraft Manufacturing Corporation as a subsidiary of UAC in June 1935.) All manufacturing interests west of the Mississippi became part of a revived Boeing Aircraft.

The latter half of the 1930s saw military procurement buildups around the world as governments foresaw possible war on the horizon. United Aircraft sold to both the United States Army and the United States Navy, but the Navy's requirements for carrier-based aircraft, with maximized power-to-weight ratios for minimized takeoff runway length, were always more in tune with the specialties of United's subsidiaries (Pratt & Whitney, Chance Vought, and Sikorsky).

United Aircraft became a component of the Dow Jones Industrial Average on March 4, 1939, when United Aircraft and AT&T were added to replace Nash Motors and International Business Machines. United Aircraft, subsequently known as United Technologies, remained a component of the Dow Jones Industrial Average until 2020.

=== 1940s ===
For the subsidiaries of United Aircraft, and for countless other manufacturing firms, World War II was an exercise in how to attempt to meet limitless demand for production (as well as for R&D). The U.S. government encouraged corporations to build up their physical plant, but the corporations knew that there would be a postwar glut of overcapacity if they did so. In many cases a compromise was reached in which the government paid partially or fully for the expansions in the form of tax breaks and accelerated depreciation.

United Aircraft ranked sixth among United States corporations in the value of wartime production contracts. At the close of the war, jet engines and helicopters were both big new things whose coming growth many companies hoped to get in on. United Aircraft entered both industries, via Pratt & Whitney and Sikorsky, respectively.

=== 1950s ===
Pratt & Whitney feared the head start that Rolls-Royce and General Electric would have in jets, based on their jet programs during the war and the late 1940s. But its jet team, led by Leonard S. Hobbs, successfully developed the Pratt & Whitney J57, which, being the most powerful jet engine on the market for some years, brought Pratt & Whitney profitability in the jet field.

Vought was spun off as an independent business in 1954. Rentschler died two years later.

=== 1960s ===
The 1960s brought new challenges, from more complex technology and bigger, more expensive aircraft to more mature markets with stiffer competition from GE, Rolls-Royce, and SNECMA. The competitions for the requested aircraft that would become the Lockheed C-5 Galaxy and the Boeing 747 were some of the financially riskier episodes. Pratt & Whitney ended up building the engines for the 747, producing the Pratt & Whitney JT9D, but the program was rocky. For several years Boeing and Pratt & Whitney struggled with an aircraft that was too heavy and underpowered. Eventually, after a lot of continued development work, the 747 redeemed itself.

On the military side of the business, the TFX joint-procurement program led to the General Dynamics F-111 Aardvark powered by the Pratt & Whitney TF30.

UAC acquired Chesapeake and Ohio Railway designed UAC TurboTrain to compete in the DOT's Northeast Corridor Demonstration Project. Two trainsets were built in 1967–1968 by Pullman for use by Penn Central Transportation Company and later Amtrak for service from 1968 to 1980. Five seven car sets were built by MLW for Canadian National Railway

=== Early 1970s ===
In the 1970s the jet engine manufacturers found that their products for the commercial (airline) market had been commoditized to a greater extent than in previous decades. Leaving behind a tradition of mating airframes to particular engines (which linked the profitability of an airframe model to that of its exclusive engine supplier), the airframe builders began offering multiple brands of engines. Producers had to compete on service, warranties, and eventually even by buying entire aircraft and then leasing them to the airlines.

==== Diversification and M&A ====
In 1974, Harry Jack Gray left Litton Industries to become the CEO of United Aircraft. He pursued a strategy of growth and diversification, changing the parent corporation's name to United Technologies Corporation (UTC) in 1975 to reflect the intent to diversify into numerous high tech fields beyond aerospace.

== Business units ==
- Chance Vought — spun-off in 1954
- Hamilton Standard
- Norden Systems — established 1958
- Pratt & Whitney
- Pratt & Whitney Canada
- Sikorsky Aircraft
