= Leonard S. Hobbs =

American aeronautical engineer

Leonard S. (Luke) Hobbs (1896–1977) was an American aeronautical engineer who started in 1920 with the Army Air Service at McCook Field in Dayton, Ohio and later worked for Stromberg Motor Devices Corporation. He was born in Carbon County, Wyoming. He developed the first float-type carburetor for aircraft engines that was capable of providing normal operation during inverted flight. In 1927 he became a research engineer at the Pratt & Whitney Aircraft Company and by 1944 was vice president of engineering for parent company United Aircraft Corporation. He won the prestigious 1952 Collier Trophy for "designing and producing the P&W J57 turbojet engine". In 1956 was elected vice chairman of United Aircraft, retiring in 1958 but remaining on the company's board of directors until 1968.

He was the author of The Wright Brothers' Engines and Their Design, published in 1971 by the Smithsonian Institution Press as part of its Smithsonian Annals of Flight series.

The 1972 Elmer A. Sperry Award was won by "Hobbs and Perry W. Pratt and the dedicated engineers of the Pratt & Whitney Aircraft Division of United Aircraft Corporation for the design and development of the JT3 turbo jet engine".
