= Renbrook School =

Coordinates: 41.7922°N 72.7861°W

- West Hartford, CT; USA

Information
- Type: Co-ed, Private
- Motto: Bringing Learning to Life
- Established: 1935
- Head of School: Matthew Sigrist
- Faculty: 89
- Enrollment: 370
- Campus: 75 acres (300,000 m^{2})
- Colors: Royal Blue and White
- Mascot: Freddie the Hawk
- Website: Renbrook.org

Renbrook School is an independent, private day school in West Hartford, Connecticut. Founded in 1935, Renbrook is an independent day school for students in three divisions; Beginning School for students in preschool through kindergarten, Lower School for grades 1-4, and Upper School for grades 5-8. With 370 students, class sizes of 10–15 are typical. Located on over 75-acres atop Avon Mountain, the main building was originally the home of Frederick Rentschler.

== Notable alumni ==
The alumni association includes over 2,400 graduates from Renbrook and the Junior School.

| Name | Class Year | Description |
|---|---|---|
| Eunice Groark | 1950 | First female Lieutenant Governor of Connecticut (1991–1995) |
| Elizabeth May | 1969 | President of the Green Party of Canada |
| Michael Sucsy | 1988 | Writer, director, and producer of the HBO film Grey Gardens (HBO film) |
| John Conklin | 1949 | Set designer and Associate Artistic Director for the Glimmerglass Opera |
| Ben Coes | 1982 | Novelist, New York Times bestselling author |
| Samantha Magee | 1998 | Olympian rower |
| Sirena Huang | 2009 | Professional Violinist |
| Charles Graeber | 1984 | Journalist and Author |
| William Tong | 1988 | Attorney General of Connecticut |
| Amir Satvat | 1996 | Video game executive known for efforts helping jobseekers |
