= Rentschler House =

Old Ohio house

- U.S. National Register of Historic Places
- U.S. Historic district – Contributing property
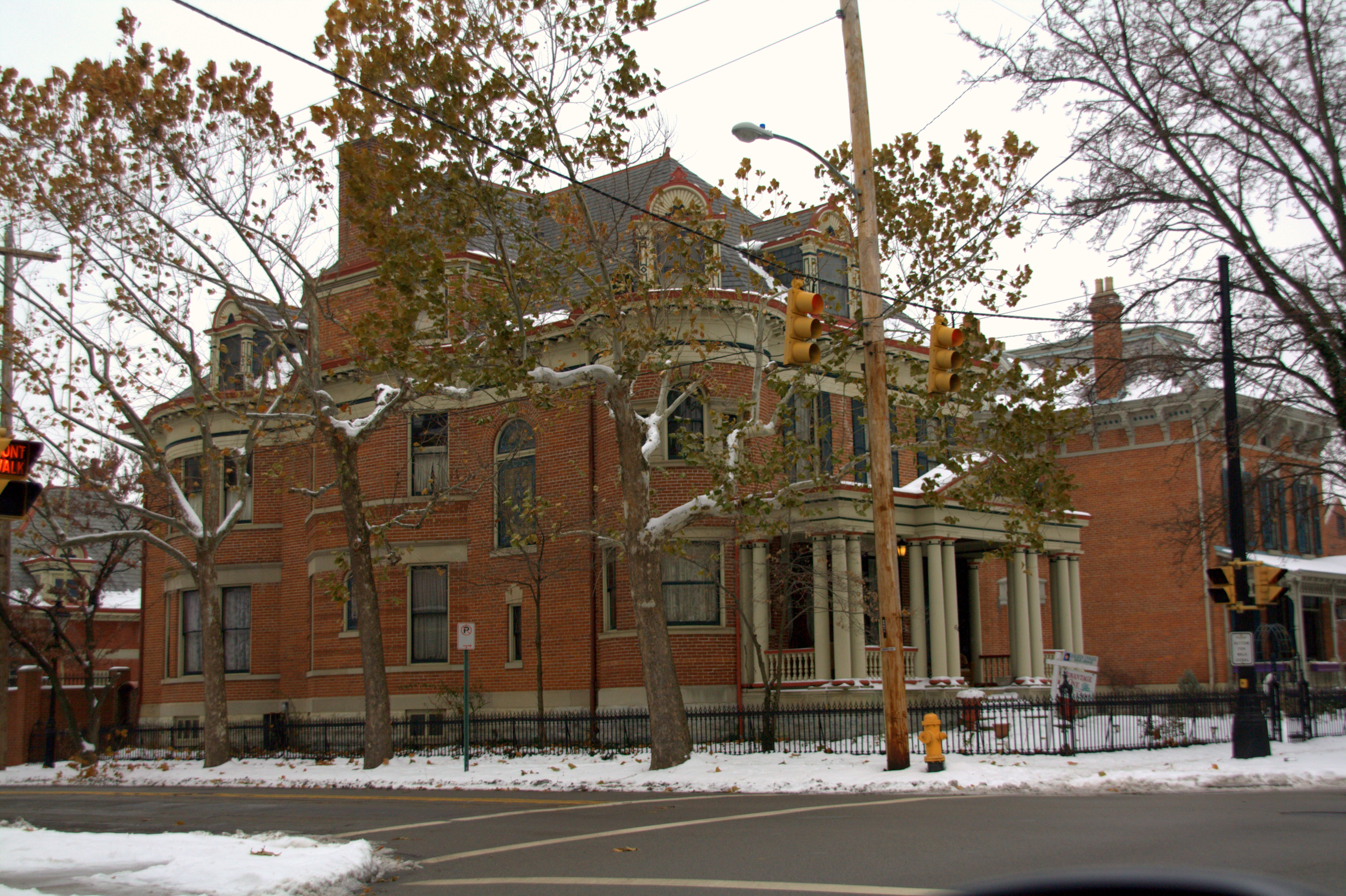
- Front and eastern side of the house

- Location within Ohio Location within the United States
- Location: 643 Dayton St., Hamilton, Ohio
- Coordinates: 39°23′59″N 84°33′13″W
- Area: 0.3 acres (0.12 ha)
- Built: 1901
- Part of: Dayton-Campbell Historic District (ID83001947)
- NRHP reference No.: 83001948
- Added to NRHP: April 21, 1983

The Rentschler House is a historic residence in the city of Hamilton, Ohio, United States. Constructed at the turn of the 20th century, it has been named a historic site.

Born in the Kingdom of Württemberg in 1846, Georg Adam Rentschler settled in Hamilton at the age of 27. He soon became the manager of a foundry in the city, and by age 30 was one of the partners in the cast iron manufacturing firm of Sohn and Rentschler. Rentschler's career in Hamilton spanned fifty years; he gained more commercial importance than any other immigrant in Hamilton's history, and he contributed to the city's growth from riverside village to small urban center. Succeeding generations of his family followed in his manufacturing footsteps and further embellished the lustre of the name of Rentschler, and it was ultimately home to Rentschler's children and members of succeeding generations.

Rentschler's house was built in 1901, featuring a slate roof above walls of sandstone and brick, along with miscellaneous sandstone and wood elements. Three stories tall, the house is irregular in plan. A large symmetrical porch crowned with a pediment surrounds the house's main entrance, but few other elements of the facade balance each other; even the dormer windows face in all directions, whether placed in the house's rounded, pyramidal, or gable roofs. An iron fence surrounds the house, which displays some Neoclassical influences in much of its design.

In April 1983, the Rentschler House was listed on the National Register of Historic Places, qualifying both because of its historically significant architecture and because of its connection to Rentschler himself. Two months later, the Dayton-Campbell Historic District was declared primarily along Dayton Street, including the lot at 643 Dayton on which the Rentschler House is located.

The Rentschler House was owned by Dr Sherry Corbett, a professor at Miami University, who was vital to the revitalization of the Dayton Lane Historic District. Dr Corbett lived in the house until her murder in 2002.

In 2014, the house was purchased by a local lawyer and his wife, who have brought new life into the home after 12 years of vacancy.
