= Frederick Rentschler =

American aerospace engineer and executive (1887–1956)

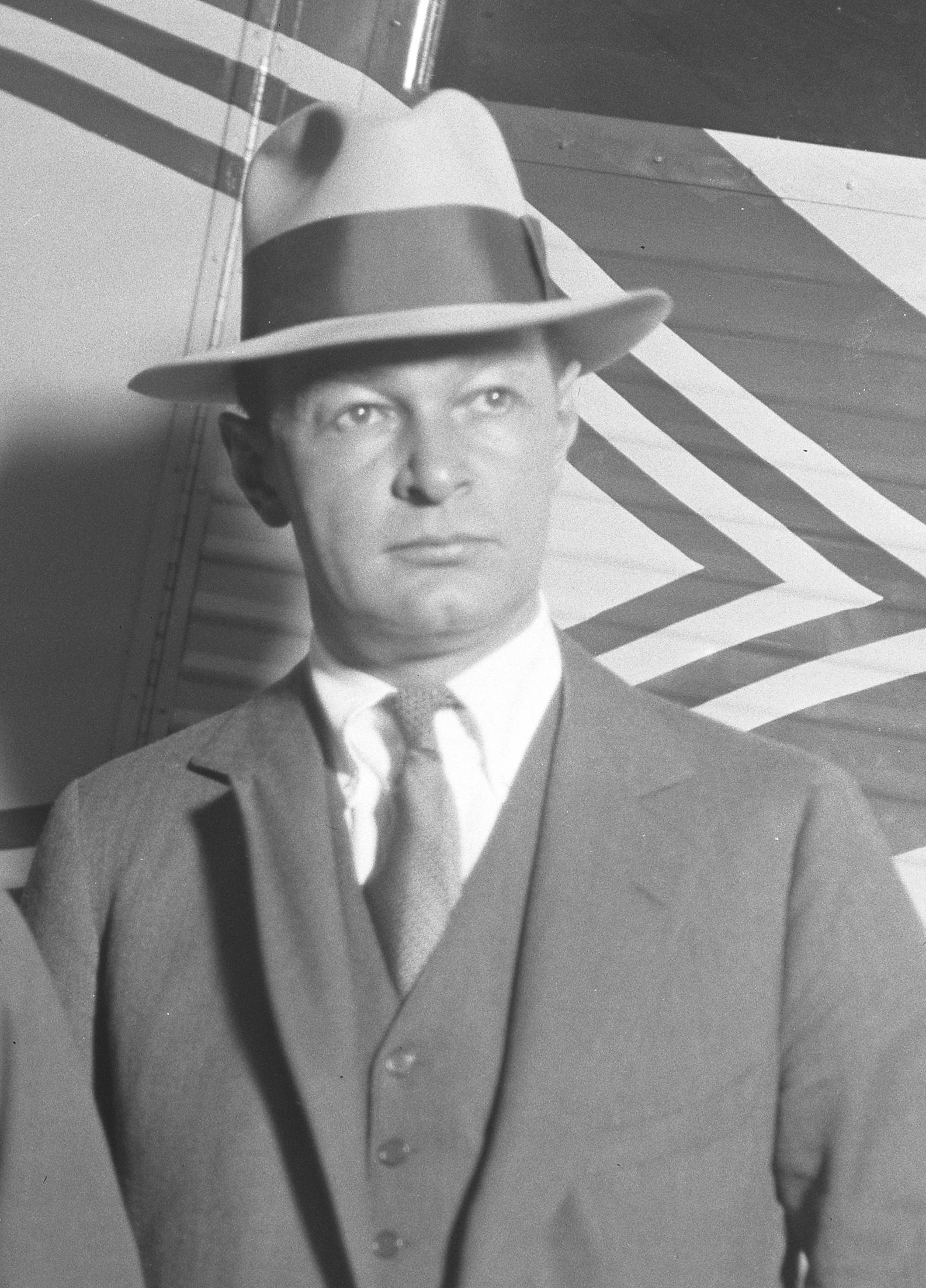
- Rentschler in 1929
- Born: November 8, 1887; Hamilton, Ohio, U.S.
- Died: April 25, 1956 (aged 68); Boca Raton, Florida, U.S.
- Resting place: West Hartford, Connecticut, U.S.
- Occupation(s): Engineer, entrepreneur, executive
- Known for: Aircraft engineer, executive of Wright Aeronautical, Pratt & Whitney, United Aircraft and Transport Corporation, and United Aircraft

Frederick Brant Rentschler (November 8, 1887 – April 25, 1956) was an American aircraft engine designer, aviation engineer, industrialist, and the founder of Pratt & Whitney Aircraft. Rentschler created and manufactured many revolutionary aircraft engines, including those used in the aircraft of Charles Lindbergh, Amelia Earhart and James Doolittle. He is also a co-founder of United Aircraft and Transport Corporation, the predecessor of United Technologies Corporation.

== Early life ==
Rentschler was born on November 8, 1887, in Hamilton, Ohio, to German-Americans George A. Rentschler and Phoebe Schwab, whose family owned the Republic Motor Car Co. that built Republic cars from 1910 until 1916. They were also principals in Hooven-Owens-Rentschler, and his brother Gordon S. Rentschler would become Chairman of National City Bank. The family resided in the Rentschler House, which has since been named a historic site.

He graduated from Princeton University in 1909 and worked in his family's businesses as a molder and machinist. When the U.S. entered World War I in 1917, he joined the United States Army. As a First Lieutenant and later Captain, he was assigned to inspect Hispano-Suiza aircraft engines manufactured under French license at the Wright-Martin plant in New Brunswick, New Jersey. The armistice of November 11, 1918, ended the contract and caused the reorganization of Wright-Martin.

== Aviator and engineer ==
Rentschler left the Army convinced that future aircraft would require lighter-weight engines with much greater power and higher reliability. His proposed design of an air-cooled engine flew in the face of conventional wisdom, which held that heavier liquid-cooled engines would power the future of aviation.

Rentschler became president of the Wright Aeronautical Corporation and pressed for research into his idea. Unable to convince his board of directors, largely composed of investment bankers with little aviation knowledge, he resigned in 1924, and supported by old friend and Wright chief engineer George J. Mead, he developed a proposal for a high-powered air-cooled aircraft engine for the U.S. Navy. Admiral William A. Moffett promised to approve the purchase of such an engine.

== Corporate executive ==
Rentschler approached the Pratt & Whitney Machine Tool Company of Hartford, Connecticut, with his idea. On July 23, 1925, they agreed to fund its development, creating the Pratt & Whitney Aircraft Company in which Rentschler and Mead had a controlling position.

Pratt & Whitney Aircraft's first engine, completed on Christmas Eve 1925, was named the Wasp by Faye Belden Rentschler, whom Frederick had married July 25, 1921. The 425 horsepower (317 kW) Wasp easily passed its official qualification test in March 1926 and the Navy ordered 200 engines. The speed, climb performance, and reliability that the engine offered revolutionized American aviation. Over the next twenty years, from the original Wasp design the Pratt & Whitney Wasp series developed, approaching ten times the power of the 1925 engine.

In 1929, Rentschler ended his association with Pratt & Whitney Machine Tool Company, but was allowed to keep the name Pratt & Whitney Aircraft Company. Rentschler, Vought and William Boeing of The Boeing Company formed the United Aircraft and Transport Corporation. United Aircraft completed the first coast-to-coast passenger network in March of that year.

In 1934, UATC was broken up, and its manufacturing interests east of the Mississippi River became United Aircraft Corporation, headquartered in Hartford with Rentschler as president.

Rentschler turned to developing jet engines after World War II. Pratt & Whitney produced the J57 jet engine in 1953. The engine was used to power the first B-52 Stratofortress in 1954.

Rentschler remained as president of United Aircraft until his death on April 25, 1956, in Boca Raton, Florida. He is buried at Fairview Cemetery in West Hartford.

== Awards ==
In 1951, Rentschler was made an Officer of the Légion d'honneur “for his contribution to the progress of aeronautical science".

In 1958, the United States Air Force posthumously presented him with the Civilian Service Award for Exceptional Service as a pioneer in the development, research and manufacture of aircraft engines.

He was inducted into the National Aviation Hall of Fame in 1982.

== Legacy ==
Pratt & Whitney's former company airfield, located in East Hartford, Connecticut, was named Rentschler Field in his honor. The airfield was decommissioned in 1995, and the land it was on was donated to the state of Connecticut in 1999. A stadium, also called Rentschler Field, was built on the site and opened in 2003 as the home field for the University of Connecticut football team.

== See also ==
- Renbrook School
