= Harvey C. Rentschler =

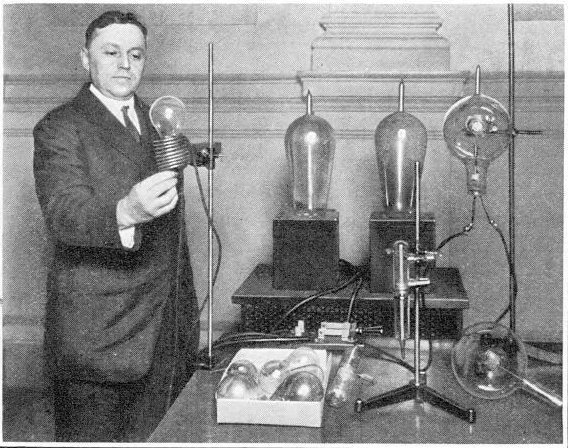
Rentschler demonstrating a "radio furnace" to melt metals in a vacuum.

Harvey Clayton Rentschler (22 September 1880 – 23 March 1949) was an American physicist, inventor, and uranium metallurgist.

Rentschler graduated in 1903 with a bachelor's degree from Princeton University and in 1908 with a Ph.D. in physics from Johns Hopkins University. From 1908 to 1917 he was a professor of physics at the University of Missouri. In 1917 he began work for the Westinghouse Electric Company as a researcher at the Westinghouse Lamp Plant in Bloomfield, New Jersey and continued working there until his retirement in 1945. He became the research director at the Lamp Plant. In 1922 Rentschler, with John W. Marden, developed an important new process.

In a new type of "radio furnace" that melts metals in a vacuum, Dr. Rentschler succeeded in obtaining the rare metal uranium in a solid mass for the first time. The device that accomplished this remarkable result and thereby inaugurated a new science—"radiochemistry"—was designed to focus a large quantity of radio power in a small space, rather than transmit it to a distance.

Working with deputy research director John W. Marden, Rentschler developed a reliable process for producing pure uranium metal. In 1942, Westinghouse was contracted by the University of Chicago Met Lab to produce uranium. The company successfully provided more than three tons of uranium for Chicago Pile-1, and supplied approximately 69 tons of uranium for the Manhattan Project.

Rentschler patented more than 100 inventions, including the Westinghouse Sterilamp™, a lamp for killing bacteria by means of ultraviolet radiation. He was elected a fellow of the American Physical Society and a fellow of the Optical Society of America. In 1941 Princeton University conferred upon him an honorary doctorate of engineering.

On 13 August 1904 in Shoemakersville, Pennsylvania, he married Margaret L. Bender.
