= Dayton–Campbell Historic District =

Historic district in Ohio, United States

- Dayton Lane Historic District
- U.S. National Register of Historic Places
- U.S. Historic district
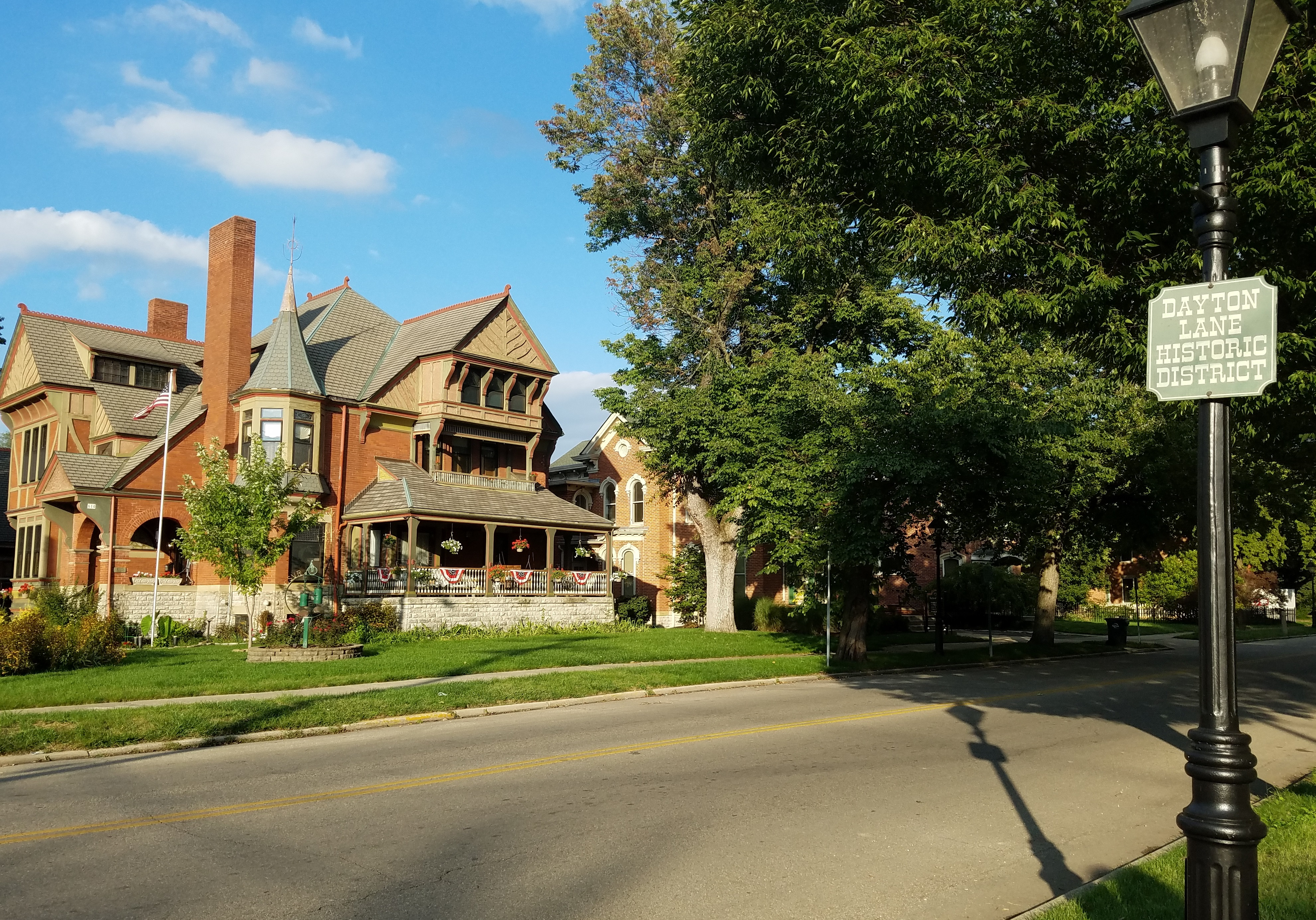

- Location within Ohio Location within the United States
- Location: Hamilton, Ohio
- Coordinates: 39°23′55″N 84°33′7″W
- Area: 240 acres (0.97 km^{2})
- Architectural style: Late Victorian, Late 19th and 20th Century Revivals and Other
- NRHP reference No.: 83001947
- Added to NRHP: 1983-06-30

Dayton Lane Historic District is a registered historic district in Hamilton, Ohio, listed in the National Register on 1983-06-30. It contains 209 contributing buildings.

== Historic uses ==
- Single Dwelling
- Multiple Dwelling
- Religious Structure
- Manufacturing Facility
