= Amos Whitney =

American mechanical engineer and businessman

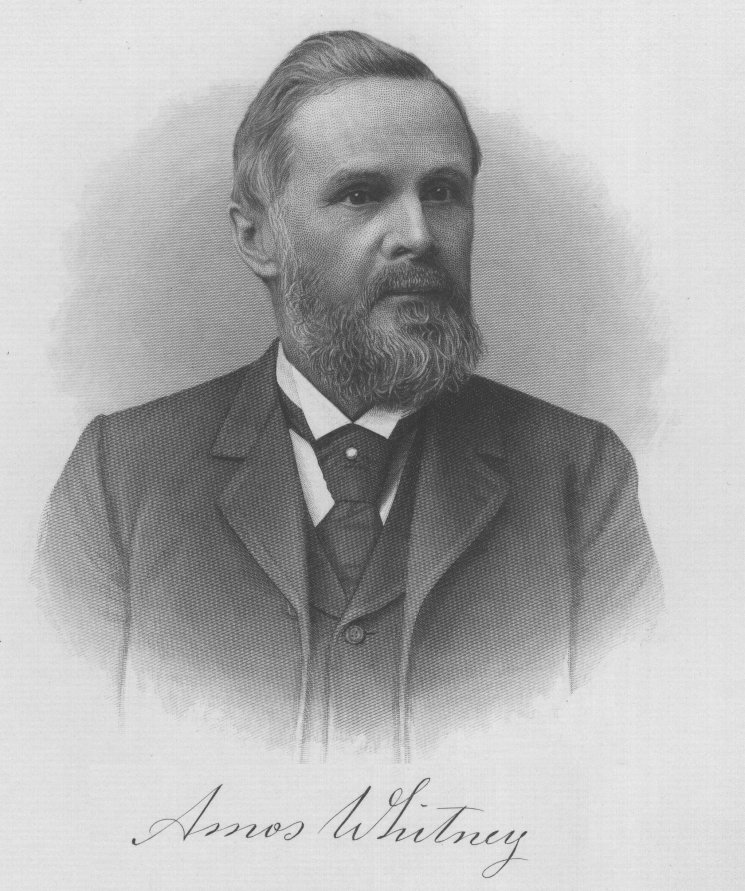
- Amos Whitney
- Born: Amos Whitney; October 8, 1832; Biddeford, Maine, United States
- Died: August 5, 1920 (aged 87); Poland Spring, Maine, United States
- Occupations: Inventor, mechanical engineer

Amos Whitney (October 8, 1832 – August 5, 1920) was a mechanical engineer and inventor who co-founded the Pratt & Whitney company. He was a member of the prominent Whitney family.

He was born in Biddeford, Maine, to Aaron and Rebecca (Perkins) Whitney and educated at the common schools in Saccarappa, Maine, and Exeter, New Hampshire. He moved at the age of 14 with his parents to Lawrence, Massachusetts, and apprenticed at the Essex Machine Company.

In 1852, he moved to Hartford, Connecticut, and worked at the Colt Armory. At Colt, he met Francis A. Pratt who soon left to become superintendent at the Phoenix Iron Works and took Whitney with him. While working at Phoenix Iron Works, Whitney designed the Lincoln milling machine.

In 1860, while still working at the Phoenix Iron Works, Pratt and Whitney formed the Pratt & Whitney company. Their first product was a thread winder for the Willimantic Linen Company. They went on to manufacture machine tools for the manufacture of guns, sewing machines, bicycles and typewriters. The manufacturing of gun making machinery rapidly increased during the American Civil War.

In 1893, Whitney was made vice-president of the company and worked as president from 1898 to 1901. The company was acquired by the Niles-Bement-Pond Company and Whitney remained as one of the directors. He also worked as president and director of the Gray Telephone Pay Station Company, director of the Pratt & Cady Co., director in the Co-operative Savings Bank and as treasurer of Whitney Manufacturing Company which was organized by his son Clarence.

He died on August 5, 1920, in Poland Spring, Maine and was interred at Cedar Hill Cemetery in Hartford, Connecticut.

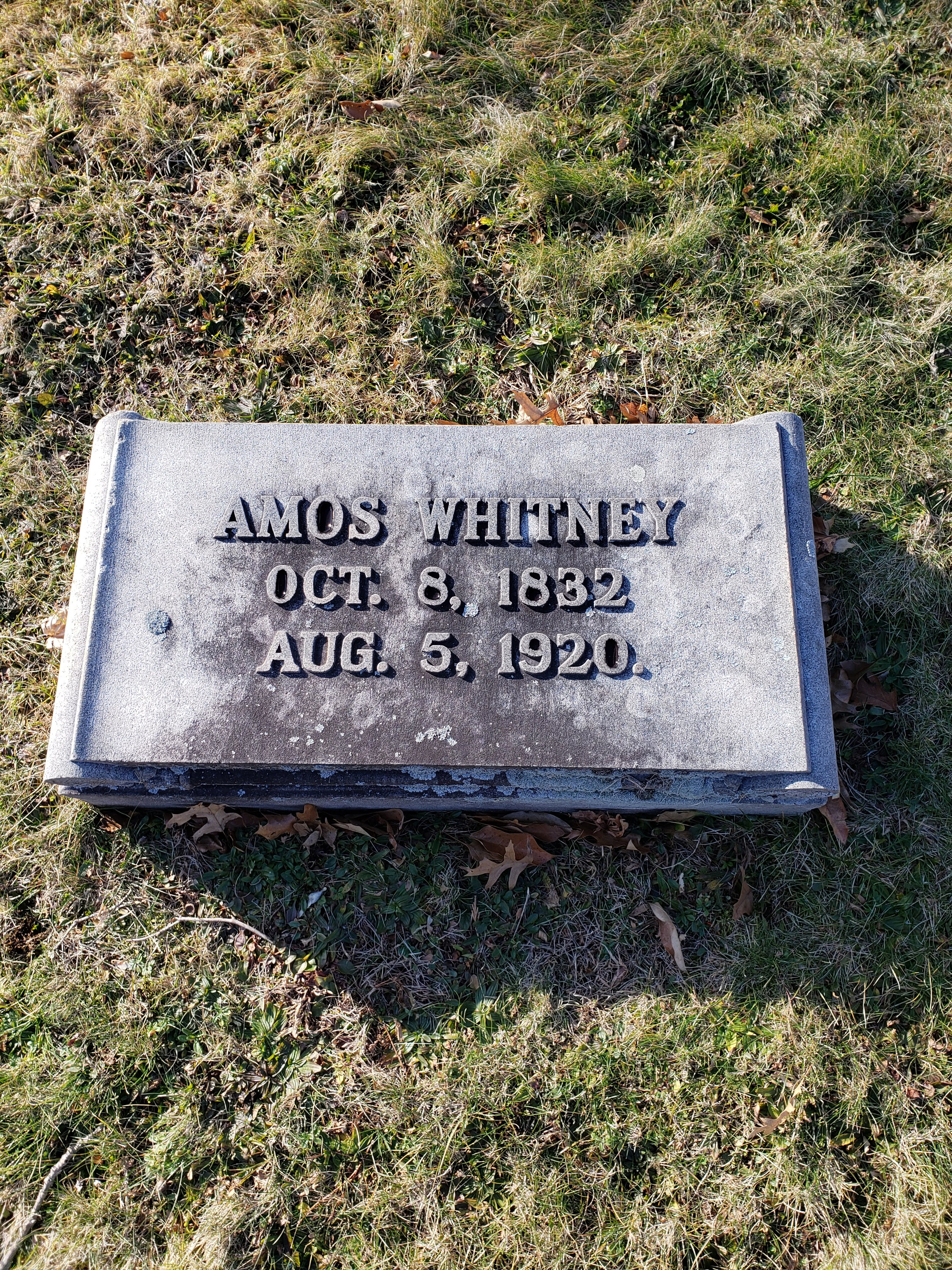
Amos Whitney gravestone in Cedar Hill Cemetery

== See also ==
- Whitney family
