= Hans Renschler =

German medical researcher

Hans Renschler (April 19, 1925 – April 30, 2011), born in Stuttgart, Germany, was a scientist in the field of internal medicine and medical didactics. He was also the founder and director of the Institut für Didaktik der Medizin at the University of Bonn.

== Research work ==
Among his many publications, some stand out: Measuring low levels of glucose in urine to monitor health, meanwhile a routine clinical test, was first standardized and published in 1965 by Renschler. An obituary was published 11/15/2011.
