= United Aircraft and Transport Corporation =

Vertically-integrated, amalgamated U.S. aviation company

- Type: Holding company
- Industry: Aerospace
- Founded: February 1, 1929; 97 years ago
- Founders: William Boeing; Frederick Rentschler
- Defunct: September 26, 1934
- Successors: Boeing Airplane Company; United Aircraft; United Airlines
- Headquarters: Hartford, Connecticut, U.S.

The United Aircraft and Transport Corporation was an American company from February 1929 to September 1934, based in Hartford, Connecticut.

The company was formed in 1929. William Boeing of Boeing Airplane & Transport Corporation teamed up with Frederick Rentschler of Pratt & Whitney. Together, they formed a large, vertically-integrated, amalgamated firm. The firm united business interests in all aspects of aviation. These included airframe and aircraft engine manufacturing and the airline business. Its goal was to serve all aviation markets, including civil aviation (cargo, passenger, private, air mail) and military aviation.

== History ==
The holding company controlled the stock of several aviation manufacturing companies, including the Boeing Airplane Company, Northrop Aircraft Corporation, Chance Vought Corporation, Hamilton Aero Manufacturing Company, Pratt & Whitney Aircraft Company, Sikorsky Aviation Corporation, and Stearman Aircraft Company. At its founding, the company initially controlled three airlines, Boeing Air Transport, Pacific Air Transport, and Stout Air Services. Other United Operations included the Boeing School of Aeronautics, United Aircraft Exports, United Airports Company of California, which built Burbank Airport, and the United Airports of Connecticut, which built factories in East Hartford for Pratt & Whitney and Chance Vought. The first annual report lists William Boeing as chairman, Frederick Rentschler as president, and Chance M. Vought, Philip G. Johnson, and George Wheat as vice presidents.

The Standard Steel Propeller Company were added to United's portfolio shortly thereafter, followed by two airlines in 1930, Varney Air Lines and National Air Transport. The airline interests were soon grouped under a new management company known as United Air Lines, Inc. However, the individual airlines (as well as the individual companies held by United) continued to operate under their own names.

== Antitrust laws ==
After the Air Mail scandal of 1934, the U.S. government concluded that such large holding companies as United Aircraft and Transport were anti-competitive, and new antitrust laws were passed forbidding airframe or aircraft engine manufacturers from having interests in airlines. This law forced United Aircraft and Transport to split into three separate companies. The company's eastern manufacturing companies (Pratt & Whitney, Sikorsky, Vought, and Hamilton Standard) were spun off into a new holding company, United Aircraft Corporation (later United Technologies Corporation, then RTX Corporation), which remained headquartered in Hartford, Connecticut, with Rentschler as president. The western manufacturing interests (including Northrop, formerly Avion Corporation), became Boeing Airplane Company, headquartered in Seattle. The airline interests were merged into a single company, United Air Lines, Inc., headquartered in Chicago. United Aircraft and Transport officially ceased to exist on September 26, 1934.

== Additional resources ==
- Fernandez, Ronald (1983), Excess Profits: The Rise of United Technologies, Boston: Addison-Wesley, ISBN 9780201104844.
- Sobel, Robert (1972). The Age of Giant Corporations: a Microeconomic History of American Business, 1914-1970. Westport, Conn., Greenwood Press: Greenwood Press. ISBN 978-0-8371-6404-5. OCLC 488208.
