= Francis A. Pratt =

American mechanical engineer and businessman

Francis Ashbury Pratt
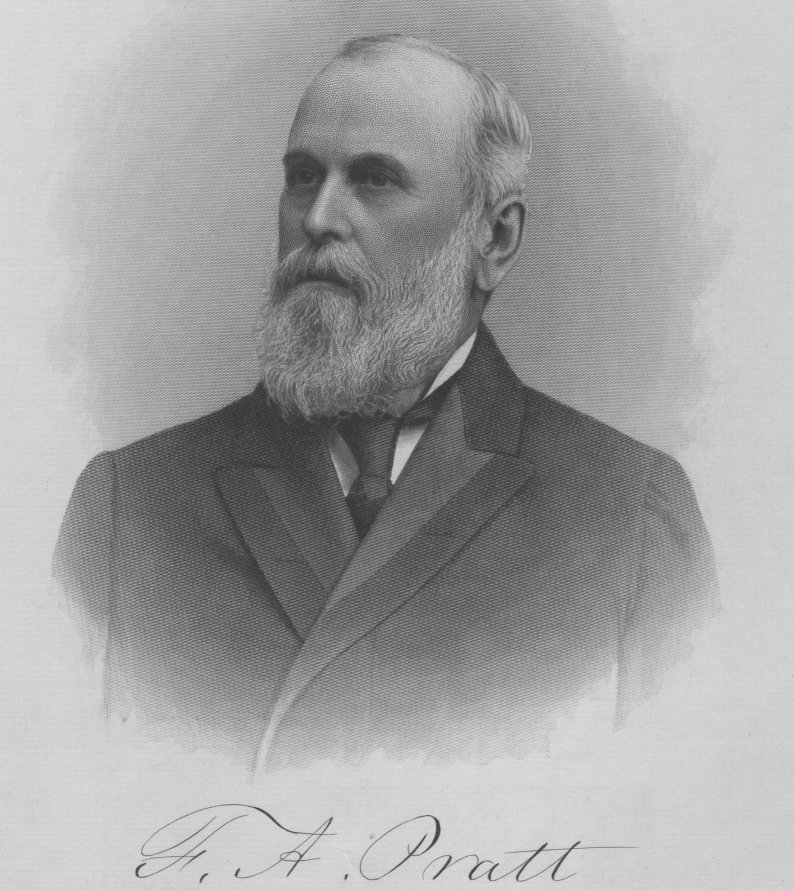
- Francis Ashbury Pratt
- Born: Francis Ashbury Pratt; February 15, 1827; Peru, New York, U.S.
- Died: February 10, 1902 (aged 74); Hartford, Connecticut, U.S.
- Resting place: Cedar Hill Cemetery, Hartford, Connecticut, U.S.
- Occupations: Inventor, businessman
- Partner: Amos Whitney

Francis Ashbury Pratt (February 15, 1827 – February 10, 1902) was an American mechanical engineer, inventor, and co-founder of Pratt & Whitney.

== Biography ==
Pratt was born in Peru, New York. His parents moved the family to Lowell, Massachusetts, when he was eight years old. He was educated in Lowell and apprenticed in a machine shop. In 1848, he moved to Gloucester, New Jersey, and worked for Gloucester Machine Works as a journeyman and contractor. In 1852, Pratt moved to Hartford, Connecticut, to work at Colt Armory. It was at Colt that he met Amos Whitney. Pratt soon left Colt to work at Phoenix Iron Works and brought Whitney along with him.

While still working at Phoenix Iron Works, he designed a milling machine for George S. Lincoln & Company of Hartford, Connecticut, which became the Lincoln miller, in some ways perhaps the most important American machine tool of the late 19th century. Over 150,000 machines were built on this form factor (by many firms).

Pratt cofounded the Pratt & Whitney company along with Amos Whitney in 1860. Their first product was a thread winder for the Willimantic Linen Company. They went on to manufacture machine tools, tools for the makers of sewing machines, and gun making machinery for use by the Union Army during the American Civil War. He is credited with being first to permit production of fine gear work. Pratt promoted interchangeable parts and the adoption of a standard system for gauges for the United States and Europe. Among several machine-tool patents, his most important was for planing metal granted on July 28, 1869.

He served as a member of the board of water commissioners for the city of Hartford for four years. He was a director of the Hartford board of trade and the Pratt & Cady company. He served as president and director of the Electric Generator Company. He was a member of the American Society of Mechanical Engineers.
