= Pratt & Whitney Measurement Systems =

American multinational corporation

- Industry: Machine tools, machinery, metrology systems
- Predecessor: Pratt & Whitney Company
- Founded: 1860; 166 years ago
- Headquarters: Originally Hartford, Connecticut; now Bloomfield, Connecticut
- Key people: Francis A. Pratt, Amos Whitney
- Products: Instruments and systems
- Website: www.prattandwhitney.com

Pratt & Whitney Measurement Systems is an American company that specializes in producing high-precision measuring instruments and systems.

== History ==
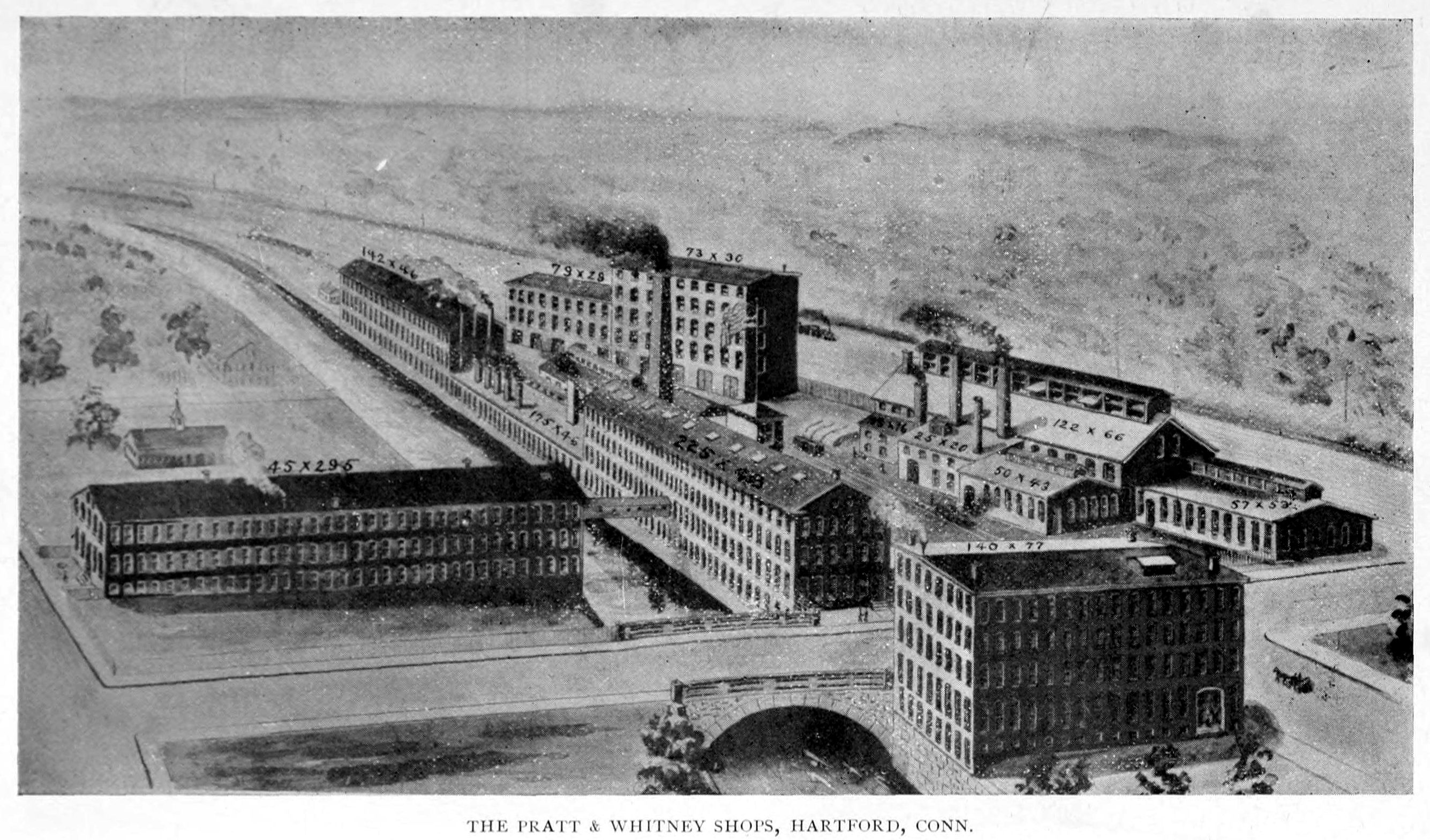
Pratt & Whitney Shops, 1896

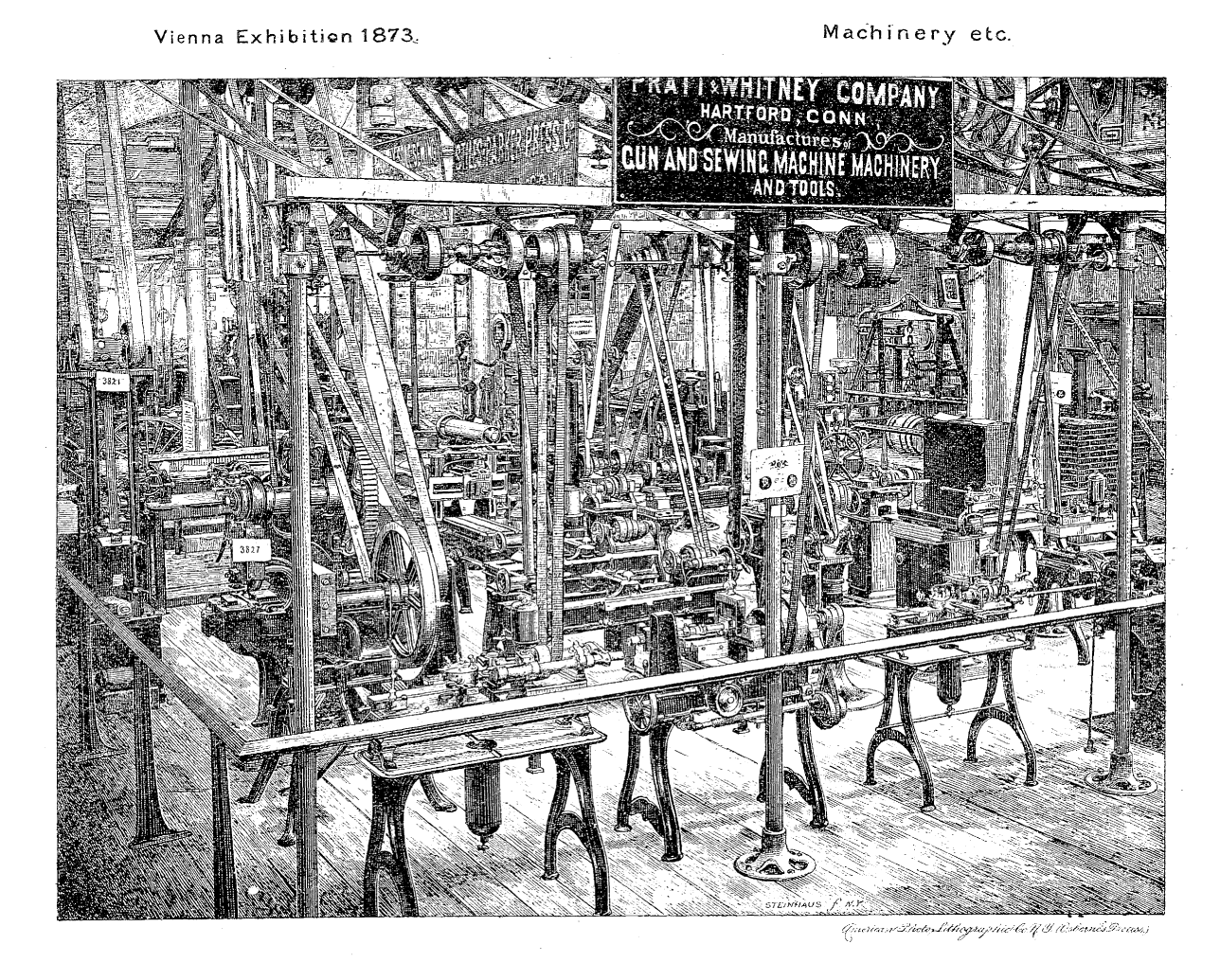
A view of the Pratt & Whitney display at the Vienna 1873 World Exhibition (Weltausstellung 1873 Wien)

The Pratt & Whitney Company was founded in 1860 by Francis A. Pratt and Amos Whitney, with headquarters in Hartford, Connecticut. The company manufactured machine tools, tools for the makers of sewing machines, and gun-making machinery for use by the Union Army during the American Civil War.

Niles-Bement-Pond Company acquired Pratt & Whitney in 1901.

In 1925, Frederick Rentschler approached Pratt & Whitney for funding and a location to build his new aircraft engine. Pratt & Whitney loaned him $250,000, the use of the Pratt & Whitney name, and space in their building. This was the beginning of the Pratt & Whitney Aircraft Company, which evolved into today's widely-known aircraft-engine manufacturer.

In 1929, Rentschler ended his association with Pratt & Whitney Machine Tool and formed United Aircraft and Transport Corporation, the predecessor to United Technologies Corporation. His agreement allowed him to carry the "Pratt & Whitney" name with him to his new corporation.

In the early 2000s, the company was owned by a division of Siemens, but by 2003 was divested.

For many years, the company maintained a plant on New Park Avenue near the Hartford/West Hartford border, where they manufactured machine tools such as their jig-bore machines and other numerically controlled machines. They also manufactured engine lathes, milling machines and twist drills. As of 2026 the company has its corporate headquarters in Bloomfield, Connecticut.

Main product-lines include universal comparators, bench micrometers, and inspection-gaging systems. These instruments primarily use laser interferometers, encoders and LVDTs, and are primarily used in quality departments, in calibration laboratories, and in manufacturing environments.
