= Pratt & Whitney =

Aircraft engine manufacturer

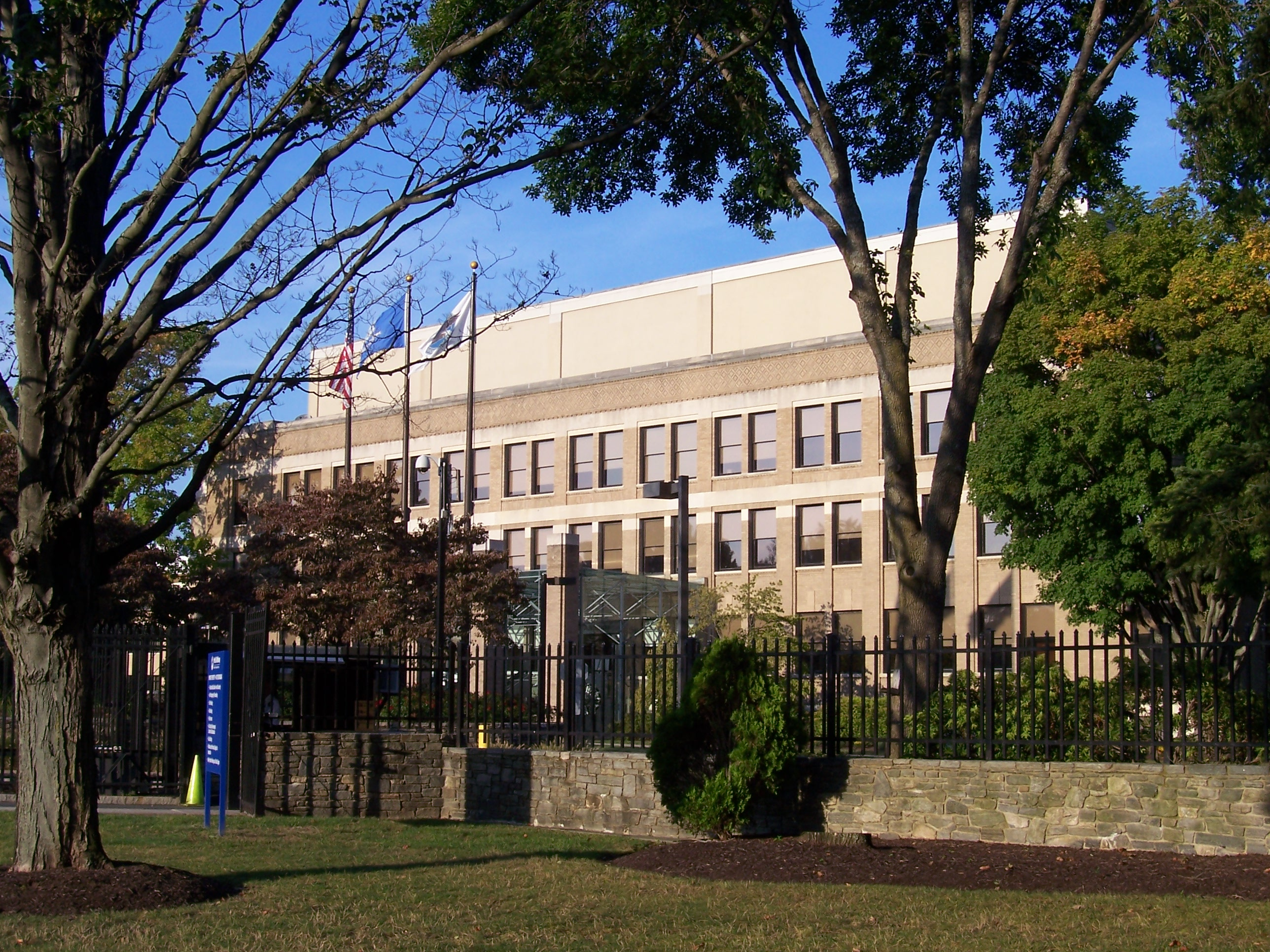
- Pratt & Whitney headquarters in East Hartford, Connecticut
- Type: Subsidiary
- Industry: Aerospace, electricity generation
- Founded: 1925; 101 years ago
- Founders: Frederick and Gordon Rentschler; Edward Deeds; George J. Mead
- Headquarters: East Hartford, Connecticut, U.S.
- Area served: Worldwide
- Key people: Shane Eddy (president)
- Products: Aircraft engines, gas turbines
- Revenue: ▲US$28 billion (2024)
- Operating income: ▲US$2,281 million (2024)
- Number of employees: 43,000 (2023)
- Parent: RTX Corporation
- Divisions: Pratt & Whitney Canada
- Website: prattwhitney.com

Pratt & Whitney is an American aerospace manufacturer with global service operations. It is a subsidiary of RTX Corporation (formerly Raytheon Technologies). Pratt & Whitney's aircraft engines are widely used in both civil aviation (especially airliners) and military aviation. Its headquarters are in East Hartford, Connecticut. The company is the world's second largest commercial aircraft engine manufacturer, with a 35% market share as of 2020. In addition to aircraft engines, Pratt & Whitney manufactures gas turbine engines for industrial use, marine propulsion, and power generation. In 2017, the company reported that it supported more than 11,000 customers in 180 countries around the world.

== History ==
=== Early history ===
In April 1925, Frederick Rentschler, an Ohio native and former executive at Wright Aeronautical, was determined to start an aviation-related business of his own. His social network included Edward Deeds, another prominent Ohioan of the early aviation industry, and Frederick's brother Gordon Rentschler, both of whom were on the board of Niles Bement Pond, then one of the largest machine tool corporations in the world. Frederick Rentschler approached these men as he sought capital and assets for his new venture. Deeds and G. Rentschler persuaded the board of Niles Bement Pond that their Pratt & Whitney Machine Tool (P&WMT) subsidiary of Hartford, Connecticut, should provide the funding and location to build a new aircraft engine being developed by Rentschler, George J. Mead, and colleagues, all formerly of Wright Aeronautical. Conceived and designed by Mead, the new engine would be a large, air-cooled, radial design. Pratt & Whitney Machine Tool was going through a period of self-revision at the time to prepare itself for the post-World War I era, discontinuing old product lines and incubating new ones. World War I had been profitable to P&WMT, but the peace brought a predictable glut to the machine tool market, as contracts with governments were canceled and the market in used, recently built tools competed against new ones. P&WMT's future growth would depend on innovation. Having idle factory space and capital available at this historical moment, to be invested wherever good return seemed available, P&WMT saw the post-war aviation industry, both military and civil (commercial, private), as one with some of the greatest growth and development potential available anywhere for the next few decades. It lent Rentschler US$250,000, the use of the Pratt & Whitney name, and space in their building. This was the beginning of the Pratt & Whitney Aircraft Company. Pratt & Whitney Aircraft's first engine, the 425-horsepower (317 kW) R-1340 Wasp, was completed on Christmas Eve 1925. On its third test run it easily passed the U.S. Navy qualification test in March 1926; by October 1926, the U.S. Navy had ordered 200. The Wasp exhibited performance and reliability that revolutionized American aviation. The R-1340 powered the aircraft of Wiley Post, Amelia Earhart, and many other record flights.

The R-1340 was followed by another very successful engine, the R-985 Wasp Junior. Eventually a whole Wasp series was developed. Both engines are still in use in agricultural aircraft around the world and produce more power than their original design criteria.

George Mead soon led the next step in the field of large, state-of-the-art, air-cooled, radial aircraft engines (which the Wasp dominated) when Pratt & Whitney released its R-1690 Hornet. It was basically "a bigger Wasp".

In 1929, Rentschler ended his association with Pratt & Whitney Machine Tool and merged Pratt & Whitney Aircraft with Boeing and other companies to form the United Aircraft and Transport Corporation (UATC). His agreement allowed him to carry the Pratt & Whitney name with him to his new corporation. Only five years later, in 1934, the federal government of U.S. banned common ownership of airplane manufacturers and airlines. Pratt & Whitney was merged with UATC's other manufacturing interests east of the Mississippi River as United Aircraft Corporation, with Rentschler as president. In 1975, United Aircraft Corporation became United Technologies.

=== 21st century ===
In October 2014, Pratt & Whitney was awarded a $592 million contract with the Department of Defense (DoD) to supply 36 F135 engines for the F-35 fighter.

In January 2017, ten employees, including the head of the F135 engine program, reportedly left the company after expenses incurred to transport South Korean officials to the company's West Palm Beach, Florida facility in 2012 were deemed unethical.

In 2020, United Technologies merged with Raytheon Company to form Raytheon Technologies, with Pratt & Whitney becoming one of the new corporation's four main subsidiaries.

In November 2022, Pratt & Whitney was awarded a contract for nearly $4.4 billion by the US DoD to build 100 jet engines for the U.S. military's Air Force, Navy, and Marine Corps branches.

As of May 2023, Pratt & Whitney was "struggling to support its fleet of passenger jets with enough spare parts and engines" which had consequences for airlines worldwide who had to ground their Airbus A320 Neo and Airbus A220. The durability of the Pratt & Whitney PW1000G geared turbofan engine since its inception in 2016 has been the central issue.

In July 2023, Pratt & Whitney issued a product recall that would affect hundreds of jet engines. The recall was issued due to a concern of metal parts being contaminated that could lead to cracking over time. In August 2023, airlines in the US, Europe and Asia announced that they would be temporarily reducing some flights so they could inspect aircraft affected by the recall. As of September 2023, it was estimated that around 3,000 engines might have been manufactured with flawed components.

== Headquarters ==
Pratt & Whitney is headquartered in East Hartford, Connecticut, and also has plants in Londonderry, New Hampshire; Springdale, Arkansas; Columbus, Georgia; Middletown, Connecticut; Middletown, Pennsylvania; Dallas, Texas; Palm Beach County, Florida; North Berwick, Maine; Aguadilla, Puerto Rico; Asheville, North Carolina; and Bridgeport, West Virginia.

Pratt & Whitney holds the naming rights for the home stadium for the University of Connecticut Huskies football team, Rentschler Field, which is located adjacent to Pratt & Whitney's East Hartford, Connecticut, campus, on Pratt's company-owned former airfield of the same name. In 2015, the stadium was renamed to Pratt & Whitney Stadium at Rentschler Field in time for the 2015–2016 University of Connecticut football season.

== Divisions ==
Pratt & Whitney is a business unit of aerospace conglomerate RTX Corporation, making it a sister company to Collins Aerospace and Raytheon. It is also involved in two major joint ventures, the Engine Alliance with GE which manufactures engines for the Airbus A380, and International Aero Engines company with Rolls-Royce, MTU Aero Engines, and the Japanese Aero Engines Corporation which manufactures engines for the Airbus A320 and the McDonnell Douglas MD-90 aircraft.

=== Commercial engines ===
Pratt & Whitney's large commercial engines power more than 25 percent of the world's passenger aircraft fleet and serve more than 800 customers in 160 countries. With over 16,000 large commercial engines installed today, Pratt & Whitney provides power to hundreds of airlines and operators, from narrow-bodied airplanes to wide-bodied jumbo jetliners. In June 2007, Pratt & Whitney's fleet of large commercial engines surpassed 1 billion flight hours of service.

=== Global Material Solutions ===
Pratt & Whitney's Global Material Solutions (GMS) makes parts for the CFM56 engine thus giving customers an alternative in new CFM56 engine materials. In addition to engine parts, GMS provides customers with fleet management and customized maintenance service programs. United Airlines was the GMS launch customer.

GMS received its first part certification in July 2007, when the Federal Aviation Administration (FAA) granted Parts Manufacturing Approval (PMA) certification for the GMS high-pressure turbine (HPT) shroud for the CFM56-3 engine. In March 2008, the FAA certified the GMS fan and booster with a Supplemental Type Certificate (STC) with FAA Chapter 5 life limits equal to the original type certificate holder. The STC was the first FAA certification ever granted for alternative life-limited engine parts. In May 2008, Global Material Solutions received FAA STCs for its remaining life limited parts for CFM56-3 engines.

=== Global Service Partners ===
Pratt & Whitney Global Service Partners (GSP) offers overhaul, maintenance and repair services for Pratt & Whitney, International Aero Engines, General Electric, Rolls-Royce, and CFMI engines. In addition to engine overhaul and repair services, GSP provides services including line maintenance, engine monitoring and diagnostics, environmentally friendly on-wing water washes, leased engines, custom engine service programs and new and repaired parts.

Pratt & Whitney maintains one of the largest service center networks in the world, with more than 40 engine overhaul and maintenance centers located around the globe.

The Global Service Partners includes Japan Turbine Technologies (JTT). JTT started in 2000 as a joint venture between Pratt and Japan Airlines, with Japan Airlines owning 33.4 percent of the venture, and Pratt & Whitney owning the rest. In July 2011 Pratt bought out Japan Airlines' share in the venture. The facility is located in the town of Taiei near the city of Narita in the Chiba Prefecture and it primarily repairs V2500, JT8D engine parts.

=== Military Engines ===
Pratt & Whitney's Military Engines power 27 air forces around the globe, with nearly 11,000 military engines in service with 23 customers in 22 nations. Pratt & Whitney military engines include the F135 for the F-35 Lightning II, the F119 for the F-22 Raptor, the F100 family that powers the F-15 Eagle and F-16 Falcon, the F117 for the C-17 Globemaster III, the J52 for the EA-6B Prowler, the TF33 powering E-3 AWACS, E-8 Joint STARS, B-52, and KC-135 aircraft, and the TF30 for the F-111 and F-14A. In addition, Pratt & Whitney offers a global network of maintenance, repair, and overhaul facilities and military aviation service centers focused on maintaining engine readiness for their customers.

=== Pratt & Whitney Canada ===
Pratt & Whitney Canada (PWC), originally Canadian Pratt & Whitney Aircraft Company, and later United Aircraft of Canada, provides a large range of products, including turbofan, turboprop and turboshaft engines targeted for the regional, business, utility and military aircraft and helicopter markets. The company also designs and manufactures engines for auxiliary power units and industrial applications. Its headquarters are located in Longueuil, Quebec (just outside Montreal).

Speaking to Reuters June 16, 2013, ahead of the Paris Airshow 2013, Pratt & Whitney President David Hess said he was confident that Canada would decide to stick with the F-35 program despite its recent discussions about having a new competition. If the orders did shift to another company, Pratt & Whitney could decide to move some of the industrial base work it is currently doing in Canada, Hess said. "We might reallocate the work elsewhere", he said, adding that reduced order volumes would likely trigger changes in Canada.

The division admitted in July 2012 to providing engines and engine software for China's first attack helicopter, the Z-10. This violated U.S. export laws and resulted in a multimillion-dollar fine.

=== Pratt & Whitney Space Propulsion ===
Pratt & Whitney Space Propulsion consisted of liquid space propulsion at the Liquid Space Propulsion Division (West Palm Beach, Florida) and solid rocket propulsion at the Chemical Systems Division (San Jose, California), as well as refurbishment and integration of the non-motor elements of the Space Shuttle's solid rocket boosters at the USBI Co. Division (NASA Kennedy Space Center, Florida). Pratt & Whitney Space Propulsion provided advanced technology solutions to commercial, government and military customers for over four decades. Products included the RL10, the upper stage rocket engine used on the Boeing Delta and Lockheed Martin Atlas rockets, high-pressure turbopumps for the Space Shuttle Main Engines (SSME) and the RD-180 booster engine, offered by RD Amross, a partnership between Pratt & Whitney and NPO Energomash of Russia, for the Atlas III and V programs. The West Palm Beach site consisted of an engineering division and manufacturing division which designed and manufactured the high-pressure turbopumps (fuel and LOX) for the Space Shuttle's Main Engines (SSME) which were manufactured by the former Rocketdyne Corporation.

=== Pratt & Whitney Rocketdyne ===
Pratt & Whitney Rocketdyne (PWR) was formed in 2005 when Pratt & Whitney Space Propulsion and Rocketdyne Propulsion & Power were merged following the latter's acquisition from Boeing.

P&W Rocketdyne engines powered the Space Shuttle, and the company also supplies booster engines for Delta II rockets and boosters and upper stage engines for Atlas III and V and Delta IV rockets.

In 2013, PWR was sold to GenCorp, which merged it with Aerojet to become Aerojet Rocketdyne.

=== Pratt & Whitney Power Systems ===
Pratt & Whitney Power Systems (PWPS) designs, builds, furnishes and supports aero-derivative gas turbine and geothermal power systems for customers worldwide. These industrial gas turbines power everything from small businesses to small cities. PWPS’ industrial turbines not only generate electrical power, but provide variable speed mechanical drive for marine propulsion, gas compression, and liquid pumping. PWPS has over 2,000 industrial gas turbines installed in more than 40 countries worldwide. PWPS also provides parts and repairs for heavy-duty frame gas turbines as an OEM alternative.

In May 2013, United Technologies Corporation (UTC) sold its Pratt & Whitney Power Systems unit to Mitsubishi Heavy Industries (MHI).

=== International Aero Engines ===
International Aero Engines is a joint venture that develops, builds and services the V2500 aero engine family, which powers the Airbus A320 family (current engine option) and McDonnell Douglas MD-90 aircraft. The four founding engine manufacturers that make up IAE each contribute an individual module to the V2500 engine. Pratt & Whitney produces the combustor and high-pressure turbine, Rolls-Royce the high-pressure compressor, JAEC the fan and low-pressure compressor and MTU the low-pressure turbine.

=== Engine Alliance ===
Engine Alliance, a 50/50 joint venture between General Electric and Pratt & Whitney, was formed in August 1996 to develop, manufacture and support a family of modern technology engines for new high-capacity, long-range aircraft. The main application is the GP7200, designed for use on the Airbus A380. It competes with the Rolls-Royce Trent 900, the launch engine for the aircraft.

The first GP7200-powered Airbus A380 entered service with Emirates on August 1, 2008, on a non-stop flight from Dubai to New York City.

=== Motorsports ===
Between 1967 and 1971, Pratt & Whitney turbine engines were used in Formula One and American Championship Car Racing. The STP-Paxton Turbocar dominated the 1967 Indianapolis 500 until a transmission bearing failed four laps from the finish. STP entered four Lotus 56s in the 1968 Indianapolis 500. One car crashed during a qualifying session. Two of the remaining cars qualified fastest and second fastest, but all three retired from the race. Turbine cars were deemed illegal before the following year's race, so Lotus chief Colin Chapman developed the car for use in Formula One and an updated 56B competed in a half dozen Formula One races in 1971.

== Products ==
=== Reciprocating engines ===
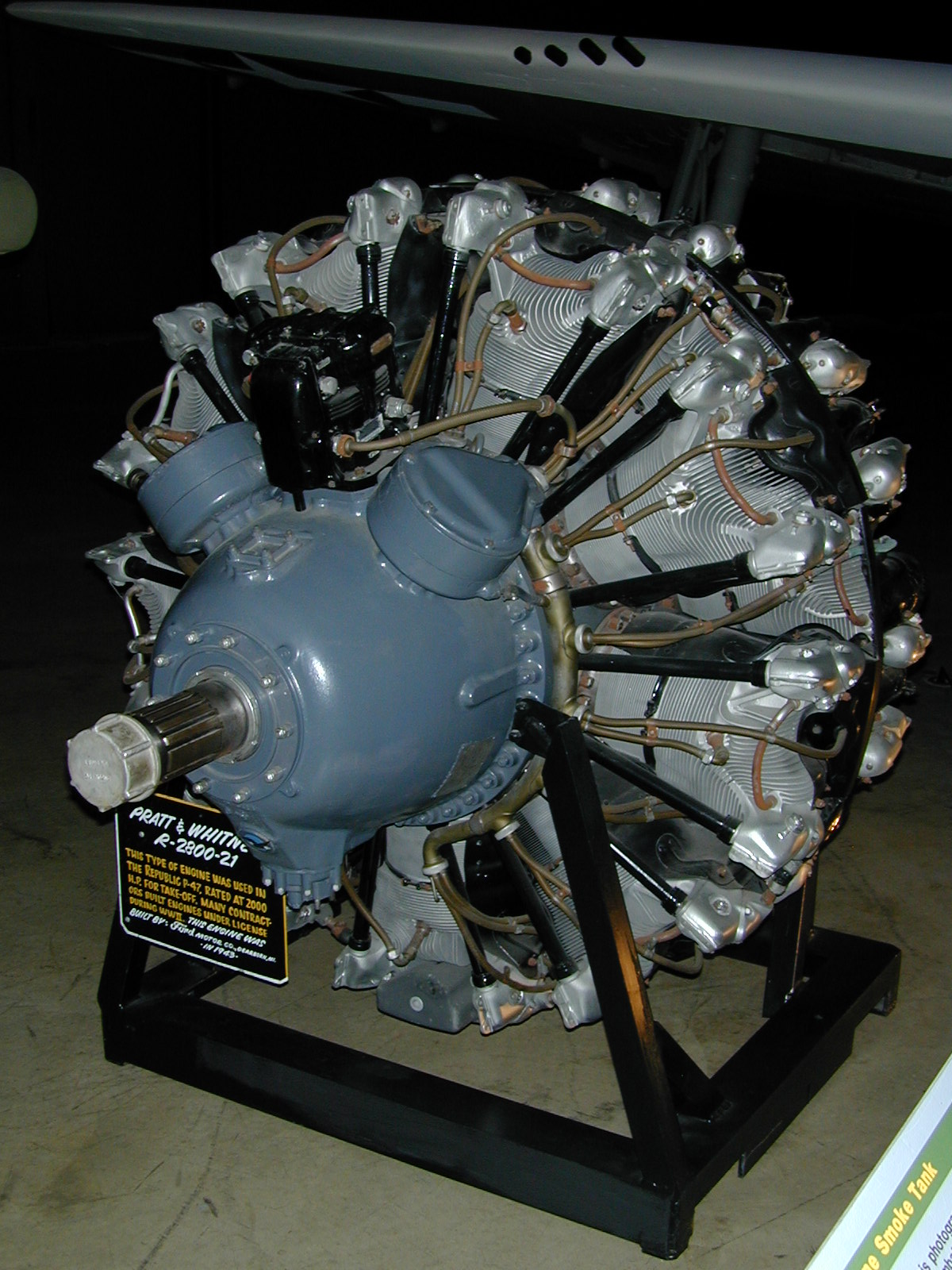
R-2800-21

Model name	Configuration	Power
Pratt & Whitney R-1340 Wasp	R9	600 hp (450 kW)
Pratt & Whitney R-1690 Hornet	R9	740 hp (550 kW)
Pratt & Whitney R-1860 Hornet B	R9	575 hp (429 kW)
Pratt & Whitney R-985 Wasp Junior	R9	400 hp (300 kW)
Pratt & Whitney R-1535 Twin Wasp Junior	R14	825 hp (615 kW)
Pratt & Whitney R-1830 Twin Wasp	R14	700 hp (520 kW)
Pratt & Whitney R-2000 Twin Wasp	R14	1,350 hp (1,010 kW)
Pratt & Whitney R-2180-A Twin Hornet	R14	1,200–1,500 hp (890–1,120 kW)
Pratt & Whitney R-2180-E Twin Wasp E	R14	1,400 hp (1,000 kW)
Pratt & Whitney R-2800 Double Wasp	R18	2,100 hp (1,600 kW)
Pratt & Whitney R-4360 Wasp Major	R28	4,300 hp (3,200 kW)

=== Turbojet engines ===
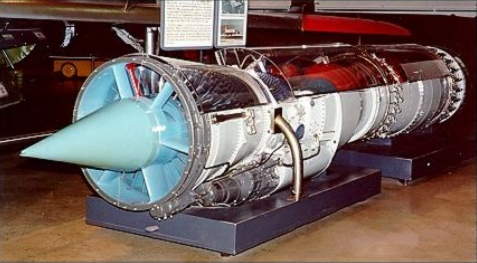
YJ57-P-3

Model name	Configuration	Power
Pratt & Whitney J42	Turbojet	5,000 lbf (22 kN)
Pratt & Whitney J48	Turbojet	7,250 lbf (32.2 kN)
Pratt & Whitney J52	Turbojet	11,200 lbf (50 kN)
Pratt & Whitney J57	Turbojet	12,030 lbf (53.5 kN)
Pratt & Whitney J58	Turbojet	18,000 lbf (80 kN)
Pratt & Whitney J75	Turbojet	17,500 lbf (78 kN)
Pratt & Whitney J91	Turbojet	
Pratt & Whitney JT12	Turbojet	3,300 lbf (15 kN)
Pratt & Whitney PW1120	Turbojet	13,530 lbf (60.2 kN), 20,585 lbf (91.57 kN) augmented

=== Turbofan engines ===
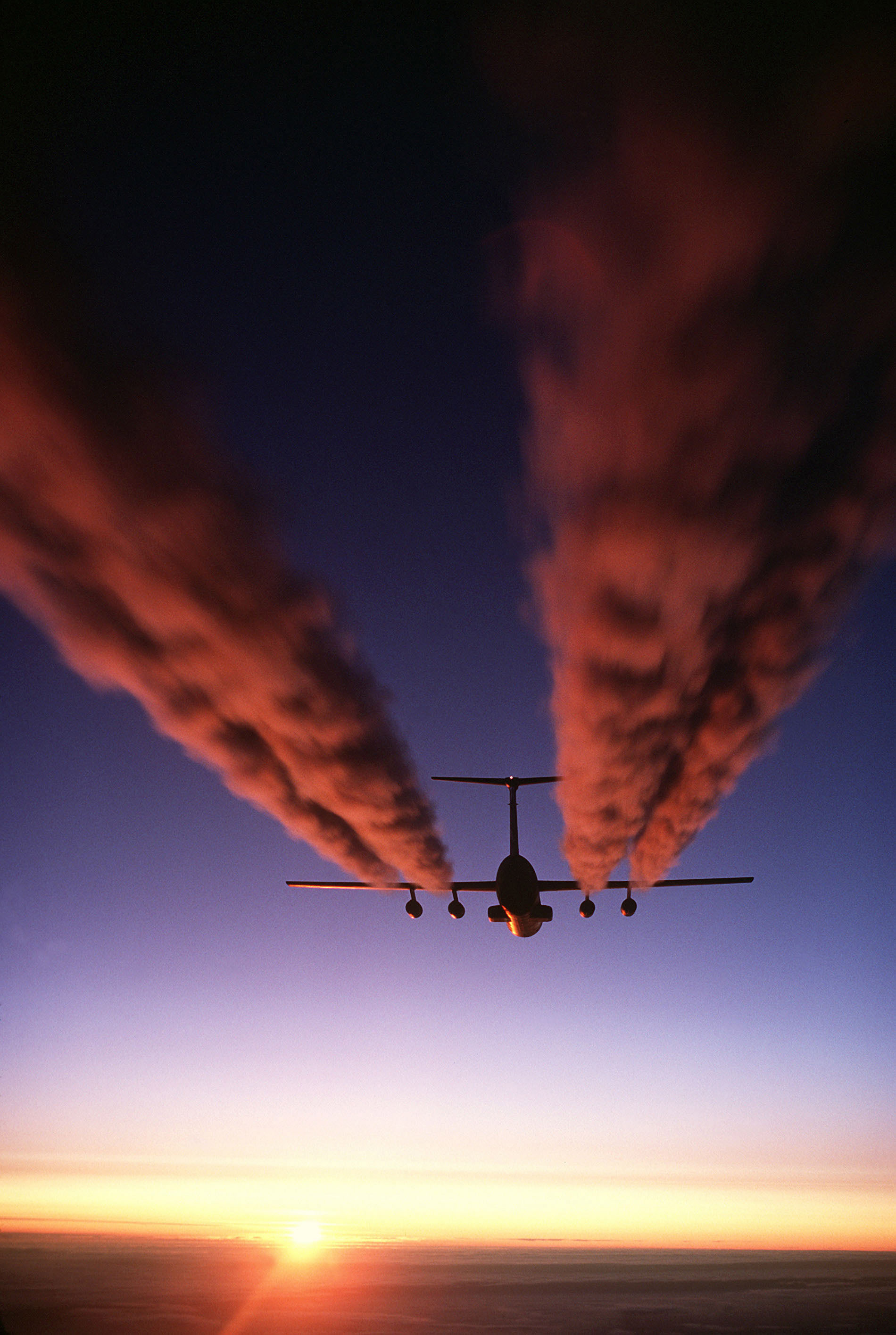
TF33s of a C-141 Starlifter leave contrails over Antarctica.

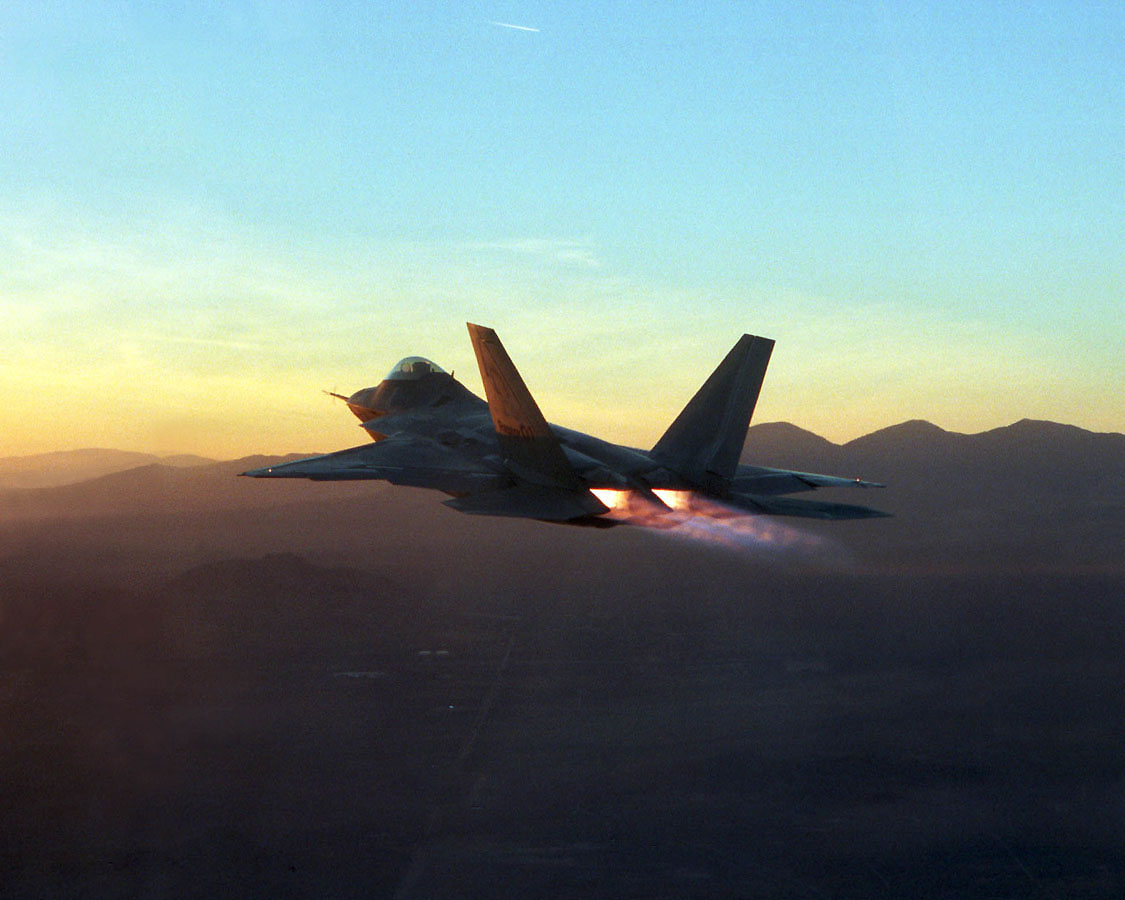
F-22 showing F119 (PW5000) engines in afterburner

Model name	Configuration	Power
Pratt & Whitney JT3D	Turbofan	17,000 lbf (76 kN)
Pratt & Whitney JT8D	Turbofan	21,000 lbf (93 kN)
Pratt & Whitney JT9D	Turbofan	48,000–56,000 lbf (210–250 kN)
Pratt & Whitney TF30	Turbofan	14,560 lbf (64.8 kN)
Pratt & Whitney F100/JTF22	Turbofan	14,590 lbf (64.9 kN), 23,770 lbf (105.7 kN) augmented
Pratt & Whitney F119/PW5000	Turbofan	26,000 lbf (120 kN), 35,000 lbf (160 kN) augmented
Pratt & Whitney F135	Turbofan	28,000 lbf (120 kN), 43,000 lbf (190 kN) augmented
Pratt & Whitney PW300	Turbofan	5,220 lbf (23.2 kN)
Pratt & Whitney PW800	Turbofan	12,000–15,000 lbf (53–67 kN)
Pratt & Whitney PW1000G	Turbofan	24,240 lbf (107.8 kN)
Pratt & Whitney PW2000	Turbofan	38,400–43,734 lbf (170.81–194.54 kN)
Pratt & Whitney PW4000	Turbofan	50,000–90,000 lbf (220–400 kN)
Pratt & Whitney PW6000	Turbofan	22,100–23,800 lbf (98–106 kN)
Engine Alliance GP7000	Turbofan	81,500 lbf (363 kN)
Pratt & Whitney PW7000	Turbofan	20,000–35,000 lbf (89–156 kN) augmented
Pratt & Whitney PW9000	Turbofan	15,000–30,000 lbf (67–133 kN)
International Aero Engines V2500	Turbofan	23,040–31,600 lbf (102.5–140.6 kN)

=== Adaptive/variable cycle engines ===
Model name	Configuration	Power
Pratt & Whitney XA101	Adaptive cycle engine	45,000 lbf (200 kN)
Pratt & Whitney XA103	Adaptive cycle engine	35,000–40,000 lbf (160–180 kN)

=== Turboprop/turboshaft engines ===
Model name	Configuration	Power
Pratt & Whitney T34	Turboprop	5,500 shp (4,100 kW)
Pratt & Whitney XT57	Turboprop	15,500 shp (11,600 kW)
Pratt & Whitney T73	Turboshaft	4,000 hp (3,000 kW)
Avco/Pratt & Whitney T800	Turboshaft	

=== Aeroderivative industrial and marine gas turbines ===
- Pratt & Whitney FT3 from JT3C and JT3D
- Pratt & Whitney FT4 from J75
- Pratt & Whitney FT8 from JT8D
- Pratt & Whitney FT9 from JT9D
- Pratt & Whitney FT12 from JT12
- Pratt & Whitney ST16 from JT8D PWC
- Pratt & Whitney ST18M – based on Pratt & Whitney Canada PW100
- Pratt & Whitney ST40M – based on Pratt & Whitney Canada PW150A. Used, for example, on private yachts.

=== Engine maintenance systems ===
Pratt & Whitney now markets its Ecopower pressure-washing service, which uses a high-pressure water spray run through several nozzles to clean grime and contaminants from jet engine parts, most notably turbine blades, to prevent overheating, improve engine operating efficiency and reduce fuel burn. The system collects the runoff from the washing process for appropriate disposal. The washing is accomplished at the airport tarmac in about one hour. Customers include United Airlines, Air India, Martinair, Thai Airways International, Virgin Atlantic, and JetBlue.

== See also ==
- List of aircraft engine manufacturers
- Mirabel Aerospace Centre
- Pierre Henry (painter)—Past Vice President of Communications with Pratt & Whitney
- Turkish Engine Center

== Bibliography ==
- Fernandez, Ronald (1983), Excess Profits: The Rise of United Technologies, Boston: Addison-Wesley, ISBN 9780201104844.
- Neumann, Gerhard (2004) [1984], Herman the German: Just Lucky I Guess, Bloomington, IN, USA: Authorhouse, ISBN 1-4184-7925-X. A republishing of the 1984 memoir titled Herman the German: Enemy Alien U.S. Army Master Sergeant [Morrow, New York, NY, USA], with a new title but with minor or no textual changes.
- The Pratt & Whitney Aircraft Story (Second ed.). Pratt & Whitney Aircraft Division. July 1952.
