= Pratt & Whitney XT57 =

Aircraft turboprop engine

XT57 / PT5
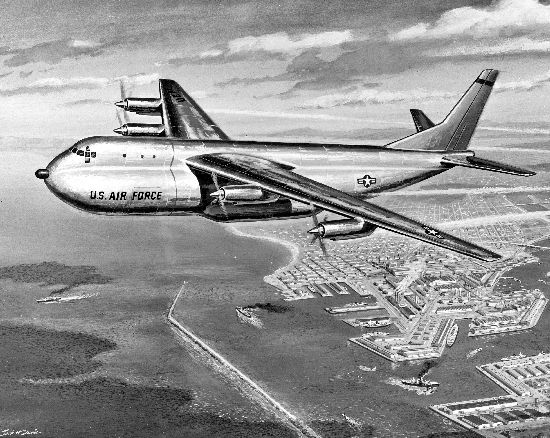
- Artist's concept of the C-132 powered by 4 T57 turboprops
- Type: Turboprop
- National origin: United States
- Manufacturer: Pratt & Whitney
- Major applications: Douglas JC-124C Globemaster II; Douglas C-132 (intended)
- Number built: 6
- Developed from: Pratt & Whitney J57

The Pratt & Whitney XT57 (company designation: PT5) was an axial-flow turboprop engine developed by Pratt & Whitney in the mid-1950s. The XT57 was developed from the Pratt & Whitney J57 turbojet.

== Design and development ==
One XT57 (PT5), a turboprop development of the J57, was installed in the nose of a JC-124C (BuNo 52-1069), and tested in 1956.

Rated at 15,000 shaft horsepower (11,000 kW), the XT57 was the most powerful turboprop engine in existence at the time, and it remains the most powerful turboprop ever built in the United States. The engine had a split-compressor (also known as "two-spool") design.

Intended for use on the Douglas C-132 aircraft, the XT57 turboprop used a Hamilton Standard Model B48P6A propeller with a diameter of 20 feet (6.1 meters), which was the largest diameter propeller to be used in flight at the time. The single-rotation propeller had four hollow steel blades, a maximum blade chord of 22 inches (56 centimeters), a length of 5 ft 6 in (1.7 m), and a weight of 3,600 pounds (1,600 kilograms).

In the late 1950s, the XT57 was studied for use in a United States Navy-proposed, nuclear-powered conversion of a Saunders-Roe Princess flying boat. Despite not having entered service, the engine was selected because it had passed a Pratt & Whitney 150-hour testing program, which involved running the engine for 5,000–7,000 hours.

== Variants ==
T57/PT5
A turboprop engine driving a 20 ft diameter (6.1 m) Hamilton Standard Turbo-Hydromatic propeller, 15,000 hp (11,185 kW) turboprop to be used on the Douglas C-132, a Mach 0.8 speed military transport aircraft.

== Applications ==
- Douglas JC-124C Globemaster II testbed
- Douglas C-132 (not built)

== Engines on display ==
The XT57 engine is on display at the Pratt & Whitney museum in East Hartford, Connecticut.

== Specifications (XT57-P-1) ==
==== General characteristics ====
- Type: Split-compressor turboprop
- Length:
- Diameter:
- Dry weight: 6,600 lb (3,000 kg)
- Propeller weight: 3,600 lb (1,600 kg)

==== Components ====
- Compressor:
- Turbine: 4-stage low pressure turbine

==== Performance ====
- Maximum power output: 15,000 equivalent shp (11,185 kW)
- Specific fuel consumption: 0.55 lb/shp/h

== See also ==
Related development

- Pratt & Whitney J52/JT8A
- Pratt & Whitney J57/JT3C
- Pratt & Whitney J75/JT4A
- Pratt & Whitney TF33/JT3D

Comparable engines

- Europrop TP400
- Kuznetsov NK-12

Related lists

- List of aircraft engines
