= Admiral Callaghan (disambiguation) =

Daniel J. Callaghan (1890–1942) was a U.S. Navy rear admiral.

Admiral Callaghan may also refer to:

- George Callaghan (1852–1920), British Royal Navy Admiral of the Fleet
- William M. Callaghan (1897–1991), U.S. Navy vice admiral
