= Pratt & Whitney J57 =

Turbojet engine

J57 / JT3C
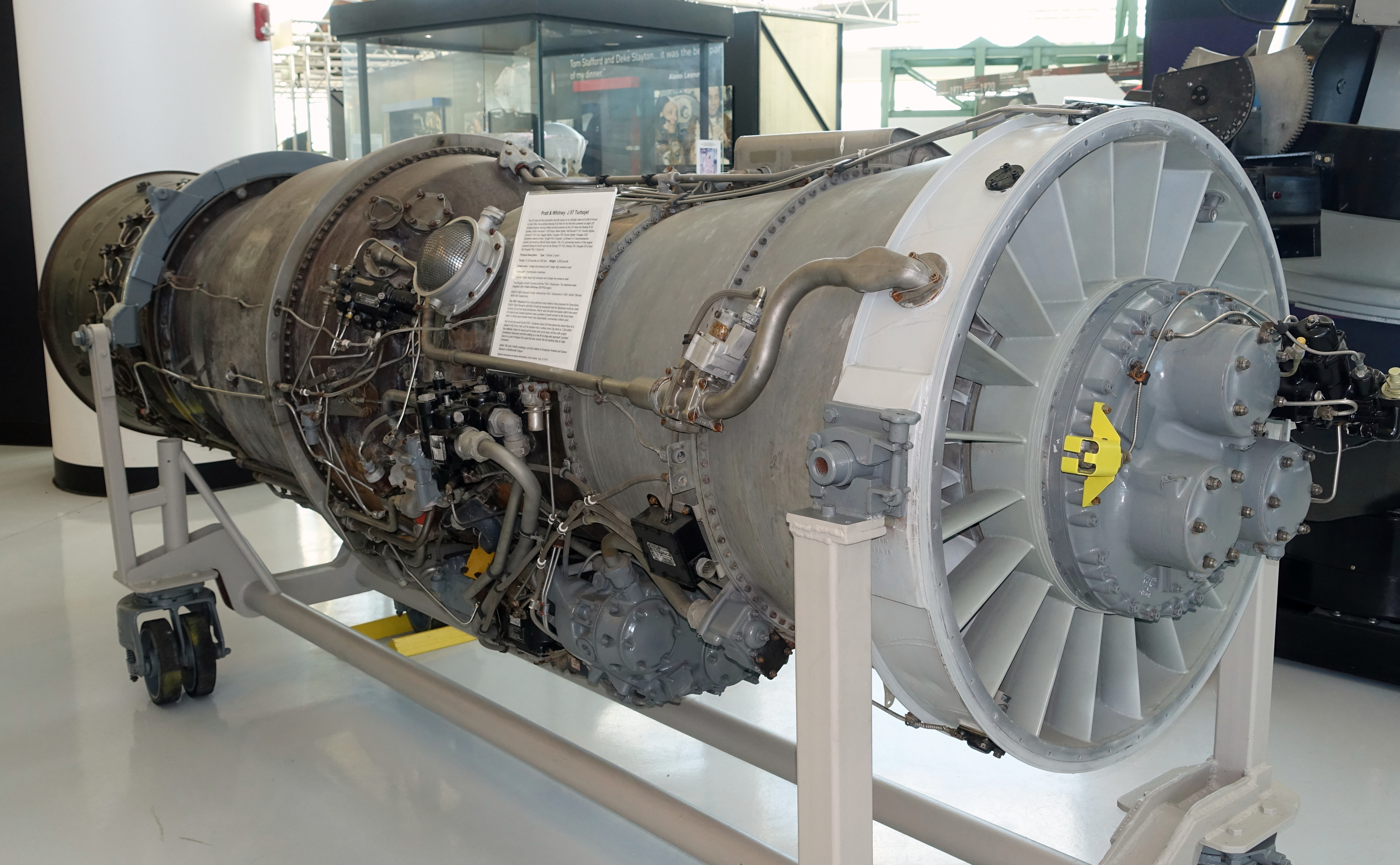
- J57 on display at the Evergreen Aviation & Space Museum
- Type: Turbojet
- National origin: United States
- Manufacturer: Pratt & Whitney
- First run: 1950
- Major applications: Boeing 707; Boeing B-52 Stratofortress; Boeing KC-135 Stratotanker; Douglas F4D Skyray; Douglas DC-8; McDonnell F-101 Voodoo; North American F-100 Super Sabre; Vought F-8 Crusader
- Number built: 21,170 built
- Developed from: Pratt & Whitney XT45
- Developed into: Pratt & Whitney J52; Pratt & Whitney J75/JT4A; Pratt & Whitney XT57/PT5
- Variants: Pratt & Whitney JT3D/TF33

The Pratt & Whitney J57 (company designation: JT3C) is an axial-flow turbojet engine developed by Pratt & Whitney in the early 1950s. The J57 (first run January 1950) was the first 10,000 lbf (45 kN) thrust class engine in the United States. It is a two-spool engine.

The J57/JT3C was developed into the J52 turbojet, the J75/JT4A turbojet, the JT3D/TF33 turbofan, and the XT57 turboprop (of which only one was built). The J57 and JT3C saw extensive use on fighter jets, jetliners, and bombers for many decades.

== Design and development ==
The J57 was a development of the Pratt & Whitney XT45 (PT4) turboprop engine that was originally intended for the Boeing XB-52. As the B-52 power requirements grew, the design evolved into a turbojet, the JT3.

Pratt & Whitney designed the J57 to have a relatively high overall pressure ratio to help improve both thrust-specific fuel consumption and specific thrust, but it was known that throttling a single high-pressure-ratio compressor would cause stability problems. As Sir Stanley Hooker explains in his autobiography, the outlet area of a compressor is significantly smaller than that of its inlet, which is fine when operating at the design pressure ratio, but during starting and at low throttle settings the compressor pressure ratio is low so ideally the outlet area should be much larger than its design value. Put crudely the air taken in at the front cannot get out the back, which causes the blades at the front of the compressor to stall and vibrate. The compressor surges, which normally means the airflow reverses direction, causing a sharp drop in thrust.

By the late 1940s, three potential solutions to the stability problem had been identified:

1. bleeding any excess compressed air at part speed overboard through interstage blow-off valves,
2. incorporating variable geometry in the first few stages of the compressor,
3. splitting the compressor into two units, one of which supercharges the other, with both units being mounted on separate shafts and driven by their own turbine.

GE adopted the second option with their General Electric J79, while Pratt & Whitney adopted the two-spool arrangement with their J57.

P&W realized that if they could develop a modest pressure ratio (< 4.5:1) axial compressor to handle adequately at any throttle setting including starting and acceleration, they could put two such compressors in series to achieve a higher overall pressure ratio.

In a two-spool arrangement, the first compressor, usually called low-pressure compressor (LPC), is driven by the low-pressure turbine (LPT) and supercharges another unit, known as the high-pressure compressor (HPC), itself driven by the high-pressure turbine (HPT). During starting the HP spool starts to rotate first, while the LP spool is stationary. As the HP spool accelerates and the fuel–air mixture in the combustor lights up, at some point there is sufficient energy in the turbine gas stream to start to rotate the LP spool, which accelerates, albeit more sluggishly. Eventually, at full throttle, both spools rotate at their design speeds. Because the exit temperature of the HPC is obviously higher than that of the LPC, a similar blade-tip Mach number for both units is achieved by making the design HP shaft speed significantly higher than that of the LP shaft. Any reductions in compressor diameter going towards the combustor exaggerates the difference.

In the same timeframe as the J57, the Bristol Aeroplane Company Engine Division in the UK also adopted the two-spool arrangement into their Olympus turbojet engine series, which went on to propel the Avro Vulcan bomber and later the Concorde. Within a few months, both P&W and Bristol had had a first run of their prototypes. Both demonstrated superb handling.

Today, most civil and military turbofans have a two-spool configuration, a notable exception being the Rolls-Royce Trent turbofan series which has three spools.

Incidentally, most modern civil turbofans use all three of the above options to handle the extremely high overall pressure ratios employed today (50:1 typically).

During the 1950s the J57 was an extremely popular engine, with numerous military applications. Production figures were in the thousands, which led to a very reliable engine. Consequently, it was only natural for Boeing to choose the J57 civil variant, the JT3C, for their 707 jetliner. Douglas did likewise with their DC-8. Pressure to reduce jet noise and specific fuel consumption later resulted in P&W using an innovative modification to convert the JT3C turbojet into the JT3D two-spool turbofan, initially for civil purposes, but also for military applications like the Boeing B-52H. The prestigious Collier Trophy for 1952 was awarded to Leonard S. Hobbs, chief engineer of United Aircraft Corporation, for "designing and producing the P&W J57 turbojet engine". The engine was produced from 1951 to 1965 with a total of 21,170 built.

Many J57 models shipped since 1954 contained 7–15% of titanium, by dry weight. Commercially pure titanium was used in the inlet case and low-pressure compressor case, whereas the low-pressure rotor assembly was made up of 6Al-4V titanium alloy blades, discs and disc spacers.

Titanium alloys used in the J57 in the mid-50s suffered hydrogen embrittlement until the problem was understood.

On May 25, 1953, a J57-powered YF-100A exceeded Mach 1 on its first flight.

The J57 was used as the gas generator for the FT3 stationary gas turbine, which was first installed in May 1962 for the Hartford Electric Light Company.

== Variants ==
Data from: Aircraft Engines of the World 1964/65, Aircraft engines of the World 1957

Thrust given in foot-pounds (lbf) and kilonewtons (kN).

J57-P-1W
11,400 lbf (51 kN) s.t with water injection, powered the Boeing B-52A Stratofortress
J57-P-1WA
As P-1W
J57-P-1WB
As P-1W
J57-P-2
YJ57-P-3
8,700 lbf (39 kN), powered the Convair YB-60
J57-P-4A
16,000 lbf (71.17 kN), powered the Vought F8U-1 Crusader
J57-P-5
J57-P-6
10,500 lbf (46.71 kN)
J57-P-6B
10,500 lbf (46.71 kN)
J57-P-7
14,800 lbf (65.83 kN)
J57-P-8
10,200 lbf (45.37 kN) / 16,000 lbf (71.17 kN) with afterburning, powered the Douglas F4D Skyray, Douglas F5D Skylancer
J57-P-8A
10,400 lbf (46.26 kN), powered the Douglas F4D Skyray
J57-P-8B
16,000 lbf (71.17 kN), powered the Douglas F4D Skyray
J57-P-9
J57-P-9W
14,800 lbf (65.83 kN)
J57-P-10
10,500 lbf (46.71 kN), powered the Douglas A-3 Skywarrior
J57-P-11
9,700 lbf (43.15 kN) / 14,800 lbf (65.83 kN) augmented?
J57-P-12
Powered the Vought XF8U-1 Crusader
J57-P-13, J57-F-13
(Note: The middle letter designated the manufacturer. "P" engines were manufactured by Pratt & Whitney, while "F" were manufactured under license by Ford Motor Company.) 14,880 lbf (66.19 kN)
J57-P-14
Slated for use in an improved version of the F5D Skylancer
J57-P-15
J57-P-16
16,900 lbf (75.17 kN), powered the Vought F8U-2 Crusader
J57-P-19W, J57-F-19W
12,100 lbf (53.82 kN), with water injection, powered the Boeing B-52C, B-52E and B-52F Stratofortress
J57-P-20
18,000 lbf (80.07 kN), powered the single Vought F8U-1T Crusader
J57-P-20A
18,000 lbf (80.07 kN), powered the Vought F8U-2NE, F-8E, F-8J and F-8K Crusader
J57-P-21, J57-F-21
17,000 lbf (75.62 kN), powered the North American F-100D Super Sabre
J57-P-21A
Powered the North American F-100D Super Sabre
J57-P-23, J57-F-23
17,000 lbf (75.62 kN)
J57-P-25
15,000 lbf (66.72 kN), powered the Convair F-102 Delta Dagger
J57-P-27
J57-P-29W, J57-F-29W
12,100 lbf (53.82 kN) with water injection, powered the Boeing B-52C, B-52E and B-52F Stratofortress
J57-P-29WA
Powered the Boeing B-52C, B-52E and B-52F Stratofortress
J57-P-31
J57-F-31W
J57-F-35
J57-P-37A
Powered the Lockheed U-2A
J57-P-39
J57-P-41
J57-F-43
J57-P-43W, J57-F-43W
13,750 lbf (61.16 kN)
J57-P-43WA
13,750 lbf (61.16 kN)
J57-P-43WB
13,750 lbf (61.16 kN)
J57-P-53
J57-P-55
11,990 lbf (53.33 kN) / 16,900 lbf (75.17 kN) with afterburning, powered the McDonnell F-101B Voodoo
J57-P-59W, J57-F-59W
13,750 lbf (61.16 kN), powered the Boeing KC-135 Stratotanker
X-176
Project designation of the JT3-8 prototype of the barrel type (meaning constant diameter LP/HP compressor case) design first run on 28 June 1949.
X-184
Project designation of the JT3-10A prototype of the barrel type design first run on 28 February 1950.
JT3-8
Dash 8 signifies 8:1 pressure ratio. One of the original barrel shaped prototypes, aka X-176.
JT3-10A
Dash 10 signifies 10:1 pressure ratio. One of the original barrel shaped prototypes, aka X-184.
JT3-10B
The prototype of the re-designed wasp-waisted (meaning reducing LP case diameter and constant HP diameter) JT3, first run on 21 January 1950 and re-designated JT3A.
JT3A
Early production/prototype re-designated from the JT3-10B wasp-waisted prototype.
JT3P
Prototype engines for the Boeing 367-80.
JT3C-2
Civilian derivative of the J57-P-43WB, 13,750 lbf (61.16 kN)
JT3C-4
JT3C-5
JT3C-6
13,500 lbf (60.05 kN)
JT3C-7
12,000 lbf (53.38 kN)
JT3C-12
13,000 lbf (57.83 kN)
JT3C-26
Civilian derivative of the J57-P-20, 18,000 lbf (80.07 kN)
FT3
Industrial gas turbine derived from J57, capable of producing 10,000 kW (13,410.22 hp).

=== Derivatives ===
- JT3D/TF33: A turbofan derivative of the J57.
- XT57/PT5: A 20 ft diameter (6.1 m), 15,000 hp (11,185 kW) turboprop intended for the Douglas C-132

== Applications ==
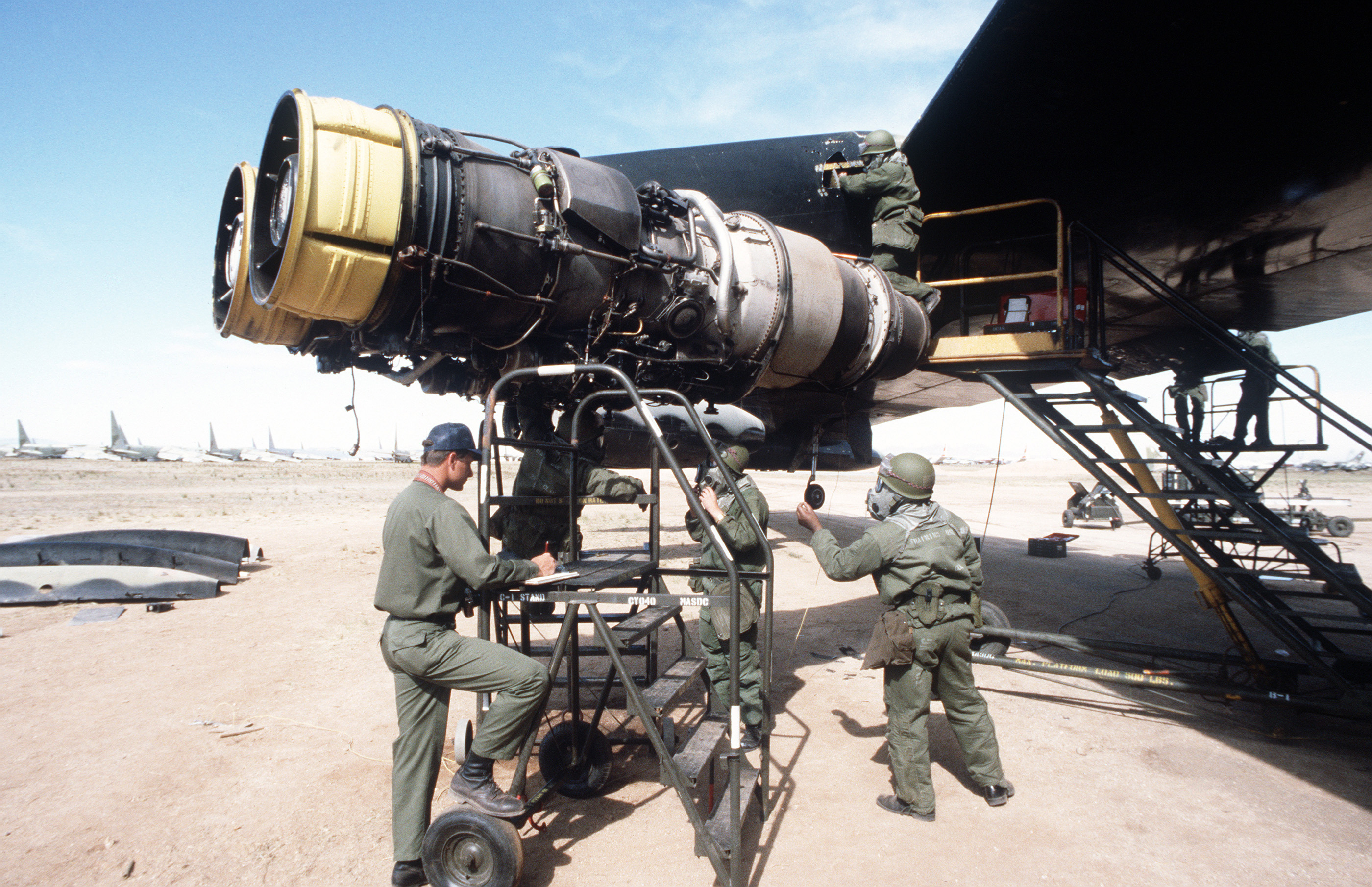
J57s on a B-52D

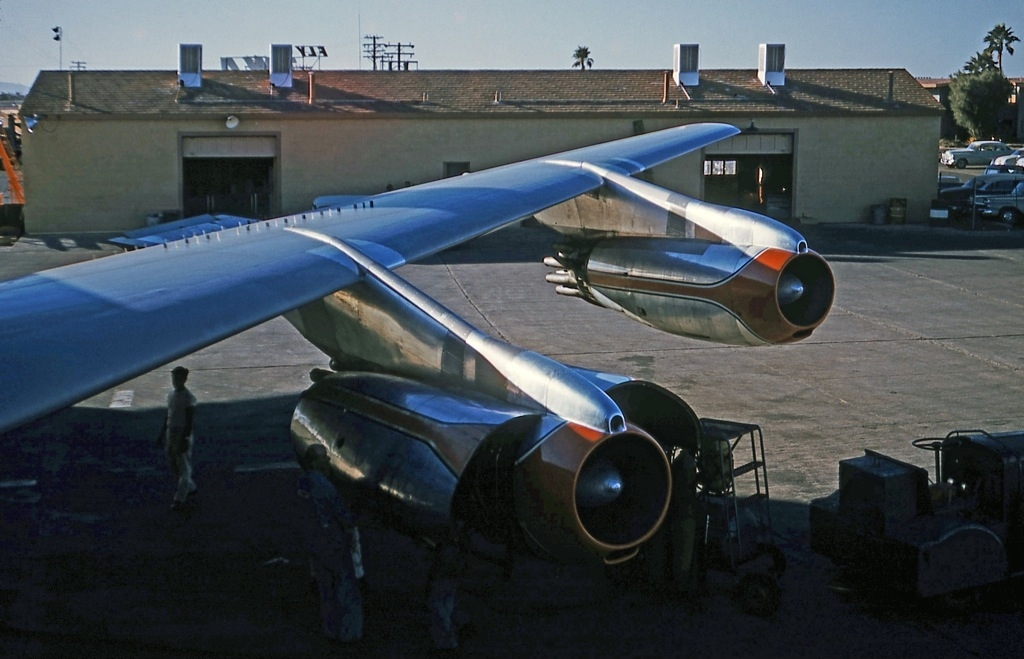
JT3Cs installed on a Boeing 707-123

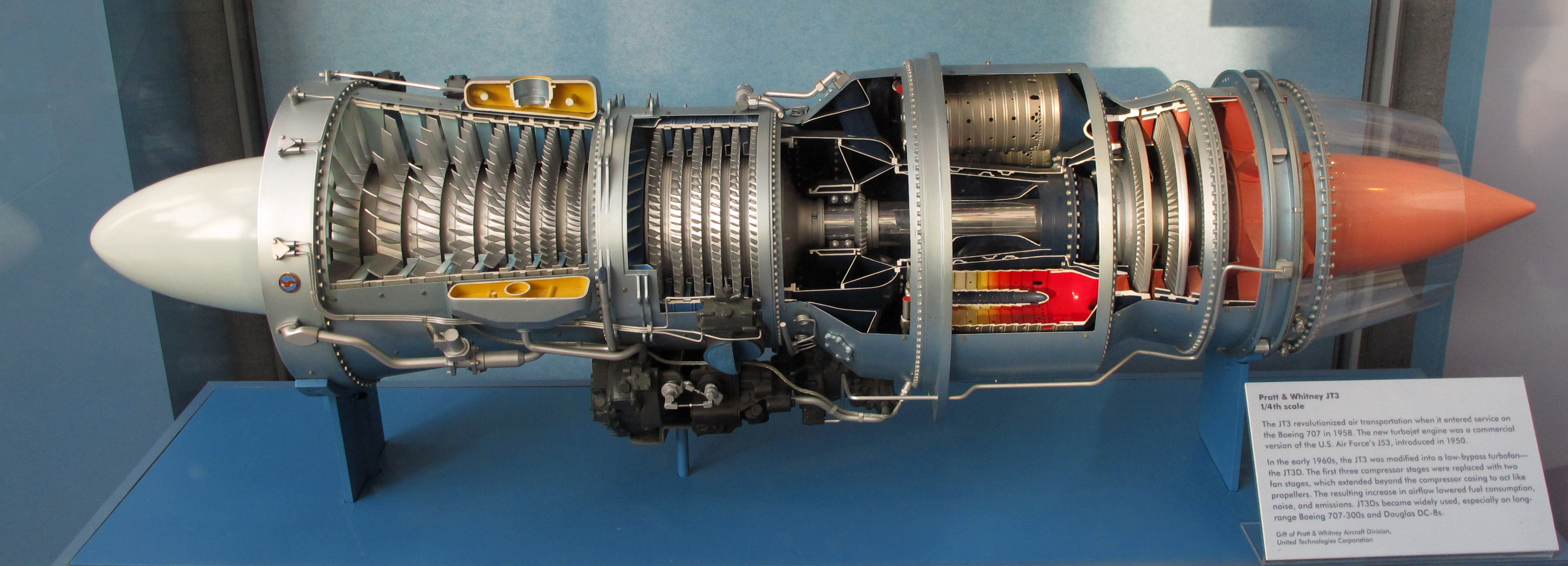
Pratt & Whitney JT3 (1/4th scale)

J57 (Military)

- Boeing B-52 Stratofortress (A-G)
- Boeing C-135 Stratolifter and KC-135 Stratotanker
- Convair F-102 Delta Dagger
- Convair YB-60
- Douglas A-3 Skywarrior
- Douglas F4D Skyray
- Douglas F5D Skylancer
- Lockheed U-2
- Martin B-57 Canberra
- McDonnell F-101 Voodoo
- North American F-100 Super Sabre
- Northrop N-94 (proposed Vought F-8 Crusader competitor, not built))
- Northrop SM-62 Snark
- Vought F-8 Crusader
- Vought V-373 (proposed F7U upgrade, not built)

JT3P

- Boeing 367-80

JT3C (Civilian)

- Boeing 707
- Boeing 720
- Douglas DC-8

== Engines on display ==
- A J57 is on display at the Texas Air Museum – Stinson Chapter, San Antonio, Texas
- A J57 cutaway is on display at the New England Air Museum, Bradley International Airport, Windsor Locks, CT.
- A J57 cutaway is on public display at the Aerospace Museum of California. It is s/n 35 used on the XB-52 program.
- A J57 is on display at the Loring AFB museum, former Loring AFB Limestone Maine.

== Specifications (J57-P-23) ==
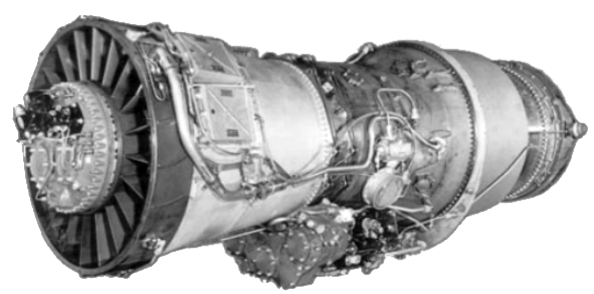
Pratt & Whitney J57 turbojet

Data from

==== General characteristics ====
- Type: Afterburning turbojet
- Length: 244 in (6197.6 mm)
- Diameter: 39 in (990.6 mm)
- Dry weight: 5,175 lb (2,347 kg)

==== Components ====
- Compressor: all-axial, 9-stage LP compressor, 7-stage HP compressor
- Combustors: cannular, 8 flame tubes
- Turbine: all-axial, single-stage HP turbine, 2-stage LP turbine

==== Performance ====
- Maximum thrust: 11,700 lbf (52.0 kN) dry, 17,200 lbf (76.5 kN) with afterburner
- Overall pressure ratio: 11.5:1
- Air mass flow: 165 lb/s (75 kg/s) at maximum power
- Turbine inlet temperature: 1,600 °F (870 °C)
- Specific fuel consumption: 2.10 lb/(lbf⋅h) (59 g/(kN⋅s)) with afterburner
- Thrust-to-weight ratio: 2.26 dry / 3.32 with afterburner

== Specifications (JT3C-7) ==
Data from Flight

==== General characteristics ====
- Type: civil turbojet
- Length: 155 in (3937 mm)
- Diameter: 39 in (990.6 mm)
- Dry weight: 4,200 lb (1905 kg)

==== Components ====
- Compressor: all-axial, 9-stage LP compressor, 7-stage HP compressor
- Combustors: cannular, 8 flame tubes
- Turbine: all-axial, single-stage HP turbine, 2-stage LP turbine

==== Performance ====
- Maximum thrust: 12,030 lbf (53.5 kN) @ take-off, SLS, ISA
- Overall pressure ratio: 12.5:1
- Air mass flow: 180 lb/s (81.65 kg/s)
- Specific fuel consumption: 0.785 lb/(lbf⋅h) (22.2 g/(kN⋅s)) @ take-off, SLS, ISA; and 0.909 lb/(lbf⋅h) (25.7 g/(kN⋅s)) @ max cruise 3,550 pounds-force (15.8 kN), M0.85, 35,000 ft (11,000 m), ISA
- Thrust-to-weight ratio: 2.86

== See also ==
Related development

- Pratt & Whitney JT8A/J52
- Pratt & Whitney JT4A/J75
- Pratt & Whitney JT3D/TF33
- Pratt & Whitney XT57/PT5

Comparable engines

- Rolls-Royce Avon
- Bristol Olympus
- Tumansky R-11

Related lists

- List of aircraft engines
