= Convair YB-60 =

American prototype bomber (1950–1954)

YB-60
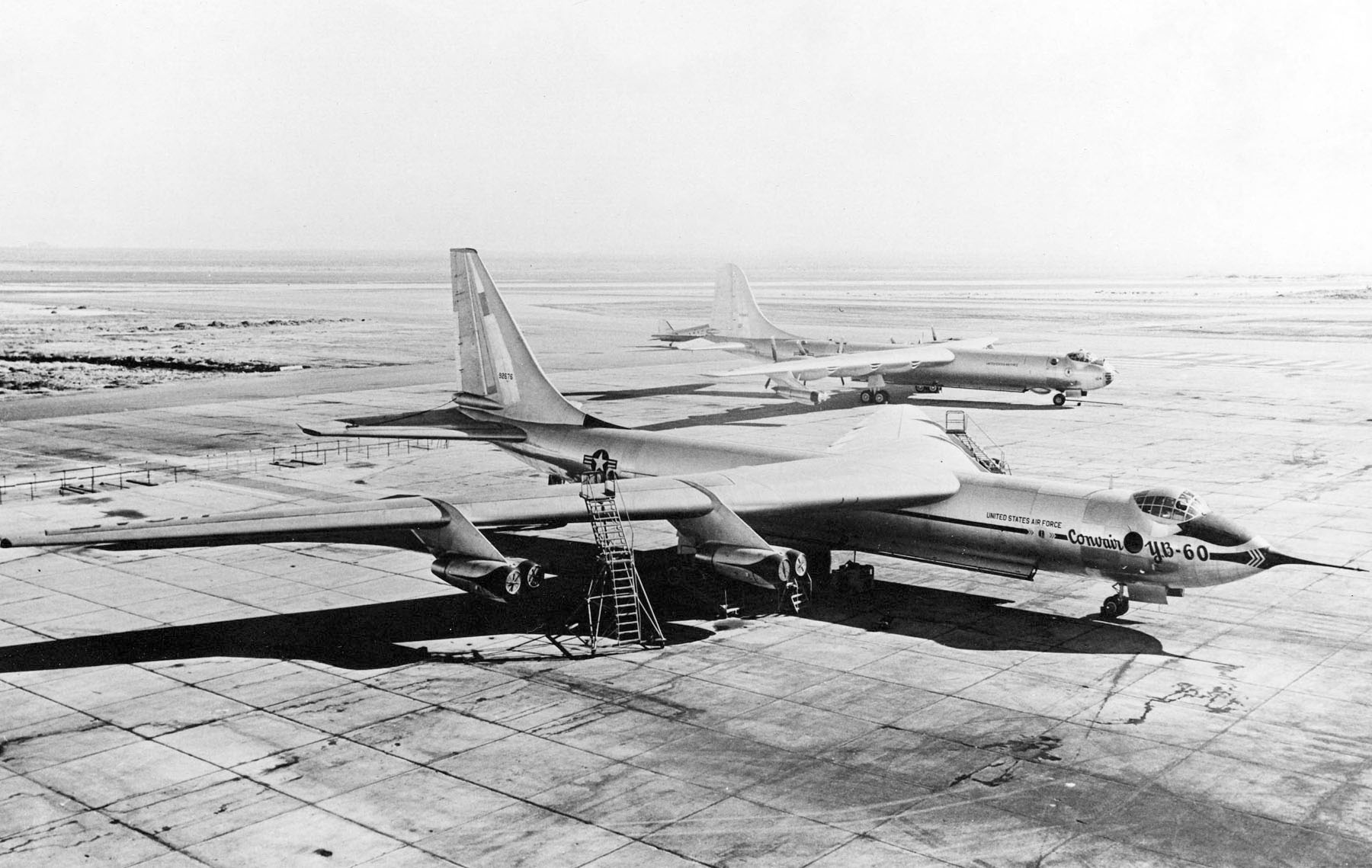
- YB-60 prototype, Convair B-36F in the background

General information
- Type: Strategic bomber
- Manufacturer: Convair
- Status: prototype only
- Primary user: United States Air Force
- Number built: 1 complete, 1 nearly complete

History
- First flight: 18 April 1952
- Developed from: Convair B-36

The Convair YB-60 was a prototype heavy bomber built by Convair for the United States Air Force in the early 1950s. It was a purely jet-powered development of Convair's earlier mixed-power B-36 Peacemaker.

== Design and development ==
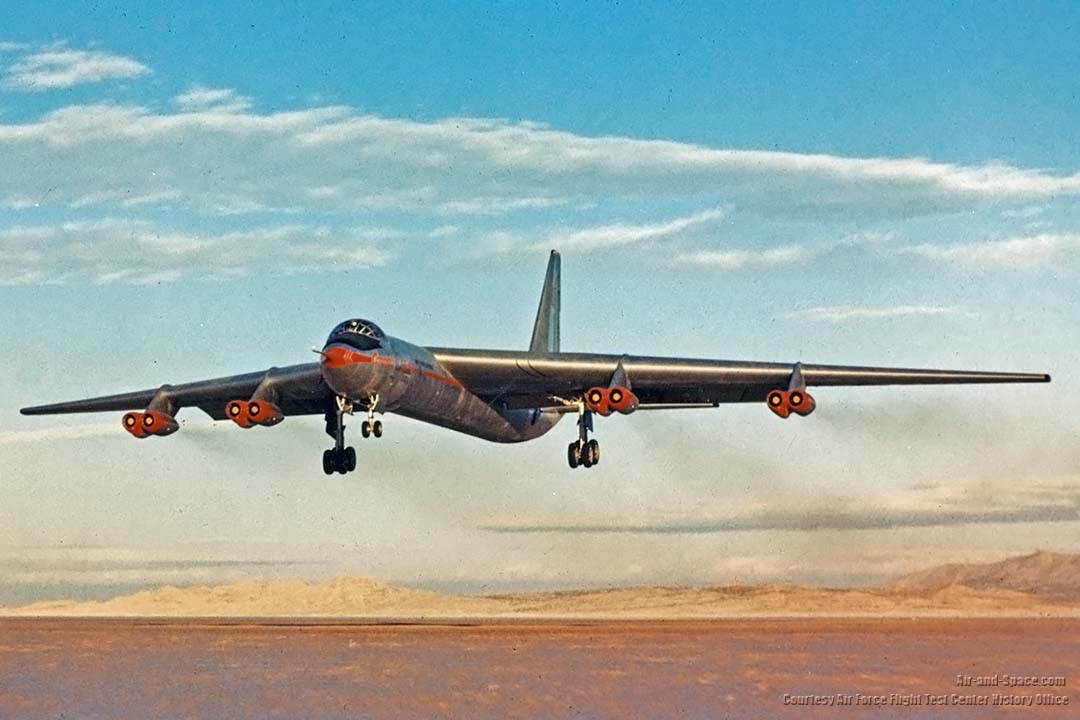
The YB-60 landing at Rogers Dry Lake, California.

On 25 August 1950, Convair issued a formal proposal for a swept-winged version of the B-36 with all-jet propulsion. The Air Force was sufficiently interested that on 15 March 1951, it authorized Convair to convert two B-36Fs (49-2676 and 49–2684) as the B-36G. Since the aircraft was so radically different from the existing B-36, the designation was soon changed to YB-60.

The YB-60 had 72% parts commonality with its piston-engined predecessor. The fuselages of the two aircraft were largely identical, although the radar and bombing systems were located in a removable nose section as a result of the poor reliability of the B-36 installation. For initial flight testing a more streamlined nose with an instrumented boom was fitted; a wedge-shaped insert was added just outboard of the main landing gear to increase wing sweep and the tail surfaces were swept to match. The swept wings also used many B-36 parts. A steerable tail wheel was added to prevent the aircraft tipping backwards. It was not necessarily extended when on the ground but depended on how the aircraft was loaded.

The YB-60's unofficial competitor for an Air Force contract was Boeing's YB-52. Convair's proposal was substantially cheaper than Boeing's, since it involved modifying an existing design rather than starting from scratch. Like the YB-52, it was powered by eight Pratt & Whitney J57-P-3 turbojets mounted in pairs in four pods suspended below the wing. Prior to this engine configuration Convair had evaluated a six-turboprop design and one with 12 J47 engines.

The first YB-60 prototype's crew numbered five; the second prototype's numbered nine, as it did in the planned production B-60s. Production B-60s were to have defensive armament similar to those of the B-36.

The YB-60, bearing serial number 49-2676, conducted its inaugural flight on April 18, 1952, under the command of Beryl Erickson. However, the YB-52 had beaten the Convair aircraft into flight by three days. The YB-60 was slower than the YB-52, cruising about 100 mph (160 km/h) less, and encountered significant handling issues attributed to controls designed for slower speeds. Despite boasting a heavier bomb capacity—72,000 lb (33,000 kg) compared to the YB-52's 43,000 lb (20,000 kg)—the Air Force concluded that the YB-60's drawbacks outweighed the benefits of its increased payload. Later modifications to the B-52, such as the "big belly" configuration, eventually raised its bomb load to 60,000 lb (27,000 kg). The flight test programs for the YB-60 were terminated on January 20, 1953, having accumulated 66 flying hours. While a second prototype was nearing completion, it never had its engines installed nor its other equipment fully integrated. Despite these challenges, Convair successfully fulfilled its prototype contract, leading to the formal acceptance of both YB-60s by the Air Force in 1954. The operational aircraft never flew again, and both airframes were dismantled and scrapped by July.

The program cost was $14.3 million.

An airliner adaptation of the YB-60 was proposed by Convair, but its wingspan and weight would have required unacceptable airport infrastructure changes beyond those required for the upcoming Boeing 707. The company decided to pursue the Convair 880 series airliner instead.

== Specifications (YB-60) ==
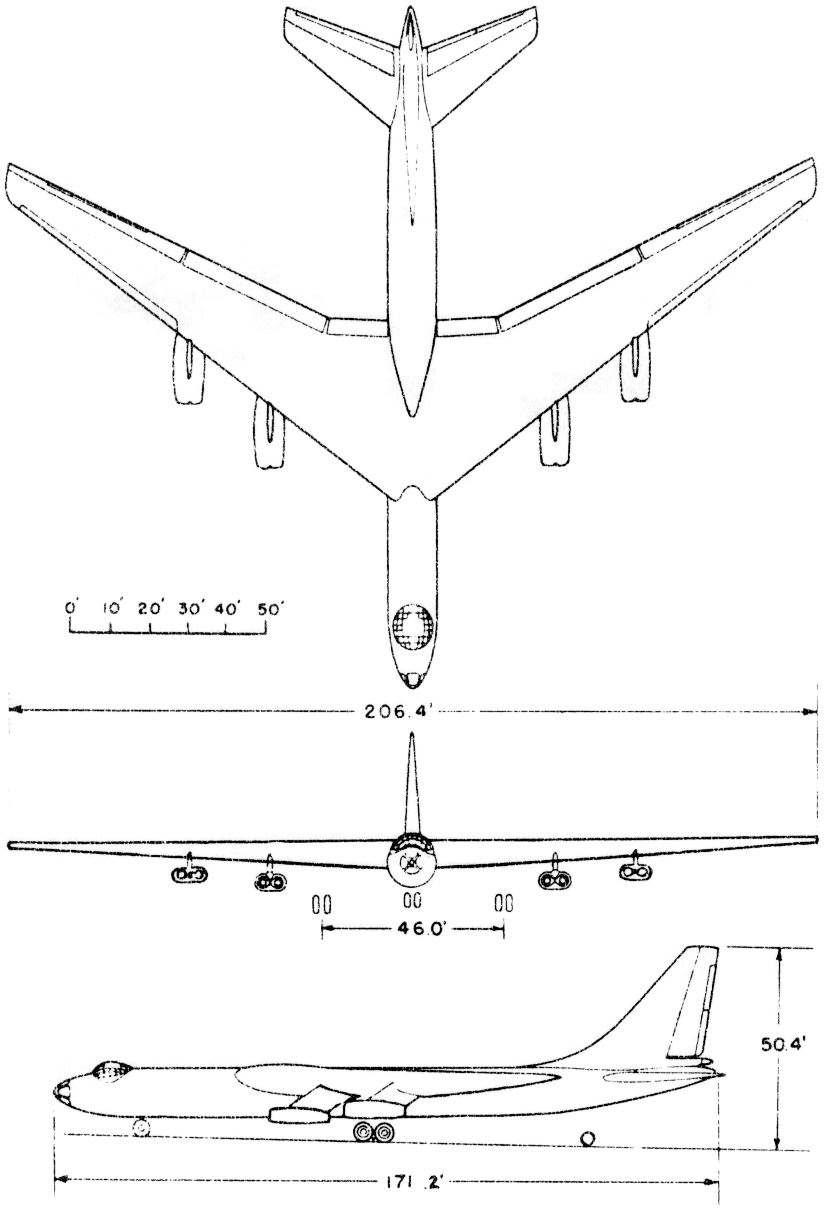
3-view line drawing of the Convair YB-60

Data from

General characteristics

- Crew: 5 (two pilots, navigator, bombardier/radio operator, radio operator/tail gunner, all in fwd compartment)
- Length: 171 ft (52 m)
- Wingspan: 206 ft (63 m)
- Height: 60 ft 6 in (18.44 m)
- Wing area: 5,239 sq ft (486.7 m^{2})
- Airfoil: root: NACA 63(420)-422 Mod.; tip: NACA 63(420)-517
- Empty weight: 153,016 lb (69,407 kg)
- Gross weight: 300,000 lb (136,078 kg)
- Powerplant: 8 × Pratt & Whitney J57-P-3 turbojet engines, 8,700 lbf (39 kN) thrust each

Performance

- Maximum speed: 508 mph (818 km/h, 441 kn) at 29,250 ft (8,915 m)
- Stall speed: 115 mph (185 km/h, 100 kn)
- Combat range: 2,920 mi (4,700 km, 2,540 nmi)
- Ferry range: 8,000 mi (13,000 km, 7,000 nmi)
- Service ceiling: 53,300 ft (16,200 m)
- Wing loading: 57.3 lb/sq ft (280 kg/m^{2})

Armament

- Guns: 2 × 20 mm (0.787 in) cannon in tail
- Bombs: 72,000 lb (33,000 kg)

== See also ==
Related development

- Convair B-36

Aircraft of comparable role, configuration, and era

- Boeing B-52 Stratofortress
- Myasishchev M-4 Molot
- Tupolev Tu-95

Related lists

- List of bomber aircraft
- List of military aircraft of the United States
