= GTS Admiral W. M. Callaghan =

Ship Launched in 1967

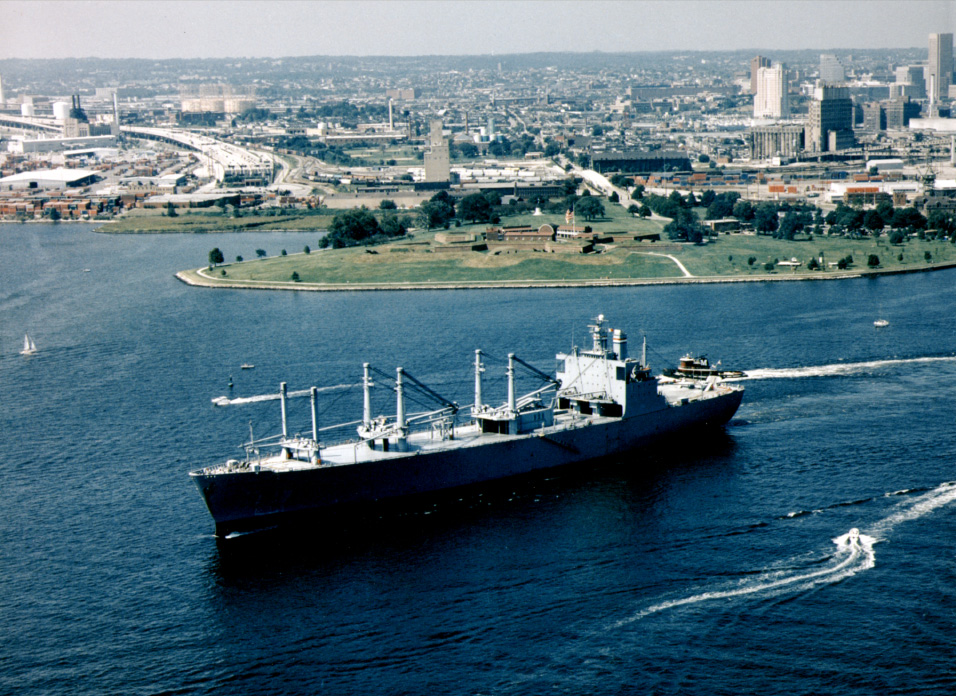

History

United States
- Namesake: Admiral William M. Callaghan
- Owner: American Export Isbrandtsen Lines
- Builder: Sun Shipbuilding and Drydock Co., Chester, Pennsylvania
- Laid down: 1966
- Launched: 1967
- Renamed: GTS Admiral W. M. Callaghan
- Identification: IMO number: 6801664; MMSI number: 367167000; Callsign: KGYE
- Notes: The ship is capable of being fully activated within 5 days

General characteristics
- Class & type: Roll-on/Roll-off Ship
- Displacement: 26,537 long tons (26,963 t)
- Length: 694 ft 3 in (211.61 m)
- Beam: 92 ft (28 m)
- Draft: 29 ft (8.8 m)
- Propulsion: 2 × LM2500 gas turbines, two props
- Speed: 21.3 knots (39.4 km/h; 24.5 mph)
- Range: not disclosed
- Capacity: up to 750 vehicles and cargo
- Complement: When active 25, when in reserve 9

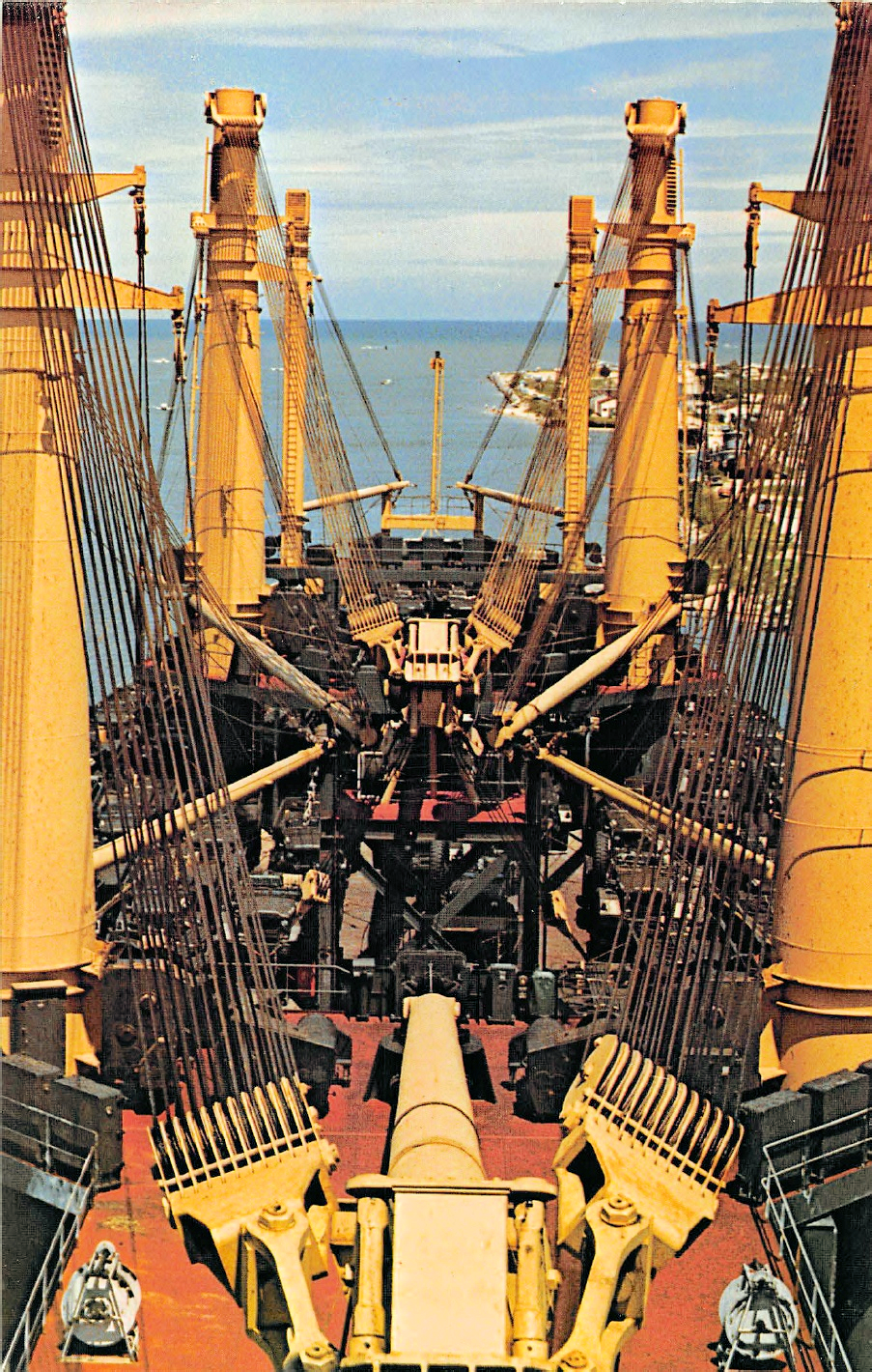
Carrying a battalion of Pershing missiles in August 1969

GTS Admiral W. M. Callaghan was constructed to be used in a commercial capacity but later optioned by Military Sealift Command to be used in logistical work throughout the fleet to deal with the changing needs of the military. The ship was delivered in 1967 and was used for transport responsibilities during the Vietnam War. It has been used in a variety of different services in its history since it was initially launched, including the war on terror in both Iraq and Afghanistan. The ship was named after Admiral William M. Callaghan who captained the battleship USS Missouri and was the first commander of the Military Sea Transportation Service, which would later become the Military Sealift Command.

In August 1969, Admiral W. M. Callaghan transported the first battalion of the Pershing 1a Field Artillery Missile System from Port Canaveral to West Germany.

Originally built with a pair of Pratt & Whitney FT4 gas turbines, one unit was replaced with an experimental LM2500 in December 1969 as part of the development efforts for the Spruance-class destroyer. Admiral W. M. Callaghan was tasked with following the speed and acceleration profiles of a destroyer for one year during her normal voyages. Some time after this trial concluded, her second FT4 was likewise replaced with an LM2500.
