= Pratt & Whitney FT4 =

Aero-derivative gas turbine engine

FT4
- Type: Gas turbine
- National origin: United States
- Manufacturer: Pratt & Whitney
- First run: 1962
- Number built: 1,000+
- Developed from: Pratt & Whitney J75

The Pratt & Whitney FT4 is an aero-derivative gas turbine engine developed from the Pratt & Whitney J75/JT4 turbojet line. Development of FT4 began in 1961 at the request of the Bureau of Ships for a lightweight, high power engine for hydrofoils, whose great speed opened new possibilities for small craft. The FT4 was run for the first time late in 1962, after which it was delivered to the United States Navy for testing.

In 1965, STAL-LAVAL placed an order for the FT4's gas generator for use with a self-designed turbine and housing for installation on the Peder Skram-class frigates of the Royal Danish Navy. The same year, the US Coast Guard picked the FT4 for use on the Hamilton-class cutters. Both classes made use of a CODOG powerplant arrangement, retaining the propulsion diesel engines that had been used on their predecessors. The first application of the engine on its own would occur in 1967, when a pair of the type were installed in GTS Admiral W. M. Callaghan as a testbed for the all-gas turbine powerplant at sea. Around this time, they secured a contract with the Royal Canadian Navy to use the systems on the Iroquois-class destroyers. The FT4 was slated for use aboard the Spruance-class destroyer in the event that the under development General Electric LM2500 failed, but when a year-long comparative test aboard the Admiral W. M. Callaghan showed the latter to require 20 percent less fuel and had comparable reliability, the FT4 was dropped from contention. The FT4 would go on to be used on the US Coast Guard's Polar-class icebreakers and saw commercial use aboard Seatrain Lines Euroliner class container ships and the cruiseferry GTS Finnjet. The US Navy's FT9 engine combined the high pressure compressor and turbine of the Pratt & Whitney JT9D-70 with the housing, low pressure compressor, power turbine, and numerous other components of the preexisting FT4C-1.

The FT4 gained its first commercial customer very early on, with Delaware Power and Light Co. installing a semi-portable natural gas–burning FT4A package in Wilmington, Delaware, in 1963, directly driving an Allis-Chalmers air-cooled generator rated 15 MW. The set found itself very well suited to power generation due to its containerized and rugged design that had been mandated by the US Navy, and was picked up by numerous power companies throughout the 1960s and 1970s, selling over 1,000 units and accumulating over 5 million hours of operation by June 30, 1976.

The engine's original manufacturing division was renamed Pratt & Whitney Power Systems in June 2000. In May 2013, Mitsubishi Heavy Industries acquired the business and rebranded it PW Power Systems. The unit later passed to the Mitsubishi Hitachi Power Systems joint venture in August 2017, and in April 2021 was renamed Mitsubishi Power Aero LLC, the current manufacturer of FT4-derived aero-derivative turbines. A modernized derivative, the FT4000, powered by a Pratt & Whitney PW4000 gas generator, was launched in December 2011.

== Applications ==
- Peder Skram-class frigate (gas generator only)
- GTS Admiral W. M. Callaghan
- Iroquois-class destroyer
- Hamilton-class cutter
- Polar-class icebreaker
- Euroliner-class container ship
- GTS Finnjet

== See also ==
Related development

- Pratt & Whitney J75

Related lists

- List of aircraft engines
