= North American F-107 =

1956 prototype fighter aircraft

F-107
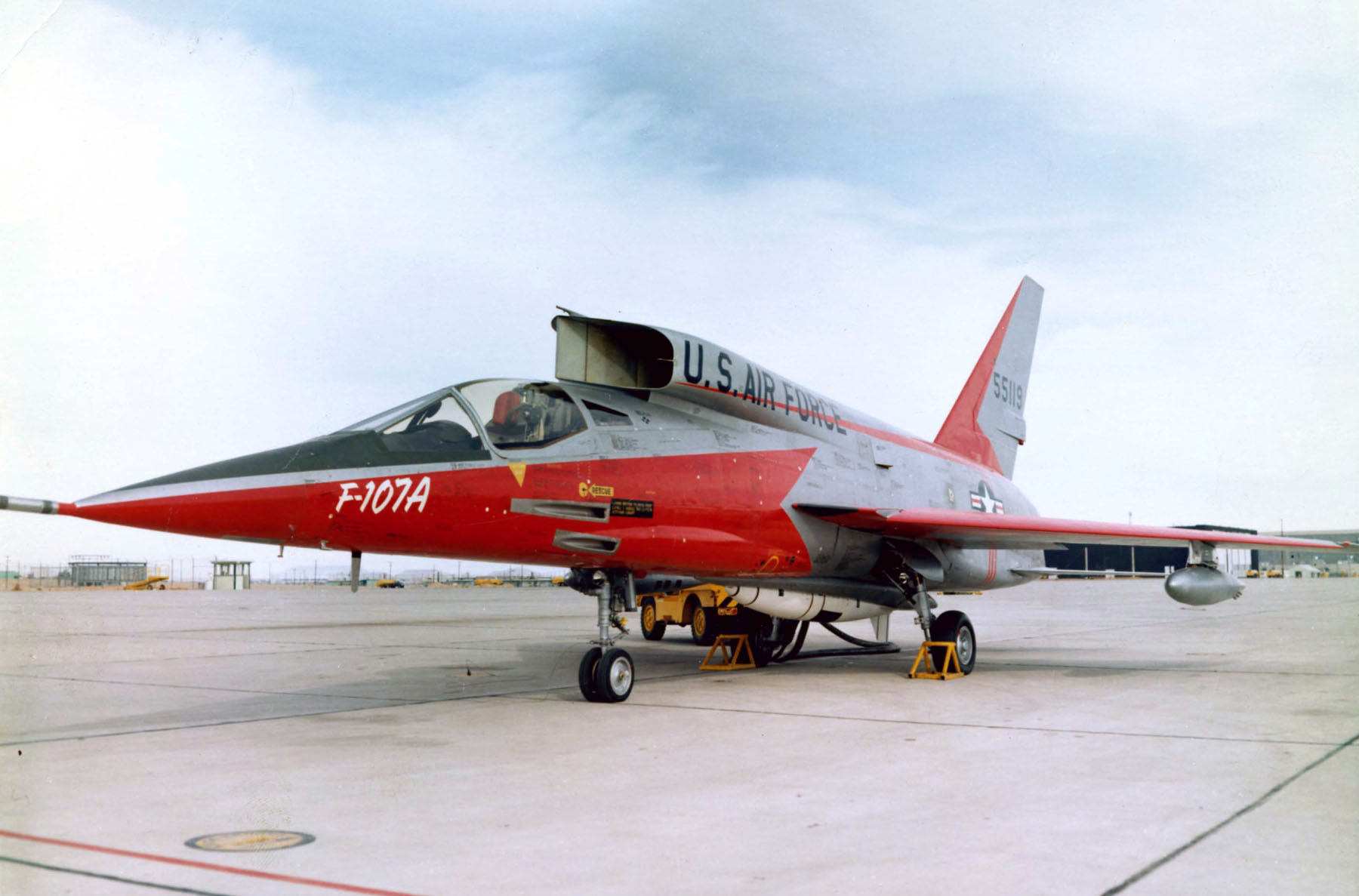

General information
- Type: Fighter-bomber
- National origin: United States
- Manufacturer: North American Aviation
- Status: Canceled
- Primary users: United States Air Force NACA
- Number built: 3

History
- First flight: 10 September 1956
- Retired: 25 November 1957
- Developed from: North American F-100 Super Sabre

The North American F-107 is a prototype aircraft that was North American Aviation's entry in a United States Air Force tactical fighter-bomber design competition of the 1950s, based on the F-100 Super Sabre. It incorporated many innovations and radical design features, notably the over-fuselage air intakes. The competition was eventually won by the Republic F-105 Thunderchief, and two of the three F-107 prototypes ended their lives as test aircraft. One is on display at the National Museum of the United States Air Force and a second at Pima Air and Space Museum.

== Design and development ==
In June 1953, North American initiated an in-house study of advanced F-100 designs, leading to proposed interceptor (NAA 211: F-100BI denoting "interceptor") and fighter-bomber (NAA 212: F-100B) variants. Concentrating on the F-100B, the preliminary engineering and design work focused on a tactical fighter-bomber configuration, featuring a recessed weapons bay under the fuselage and provision for six hardpoints underneath the wings. Single-point refueling capability was provided while a retractable tailskid was installed. An all-moving vertical fin and an automated flight control system were incorporated which permitted the aircraft to roll at supersonic speeds using spoilers. The flight control system was upgraded by the addition of pitch and yaw dampers.

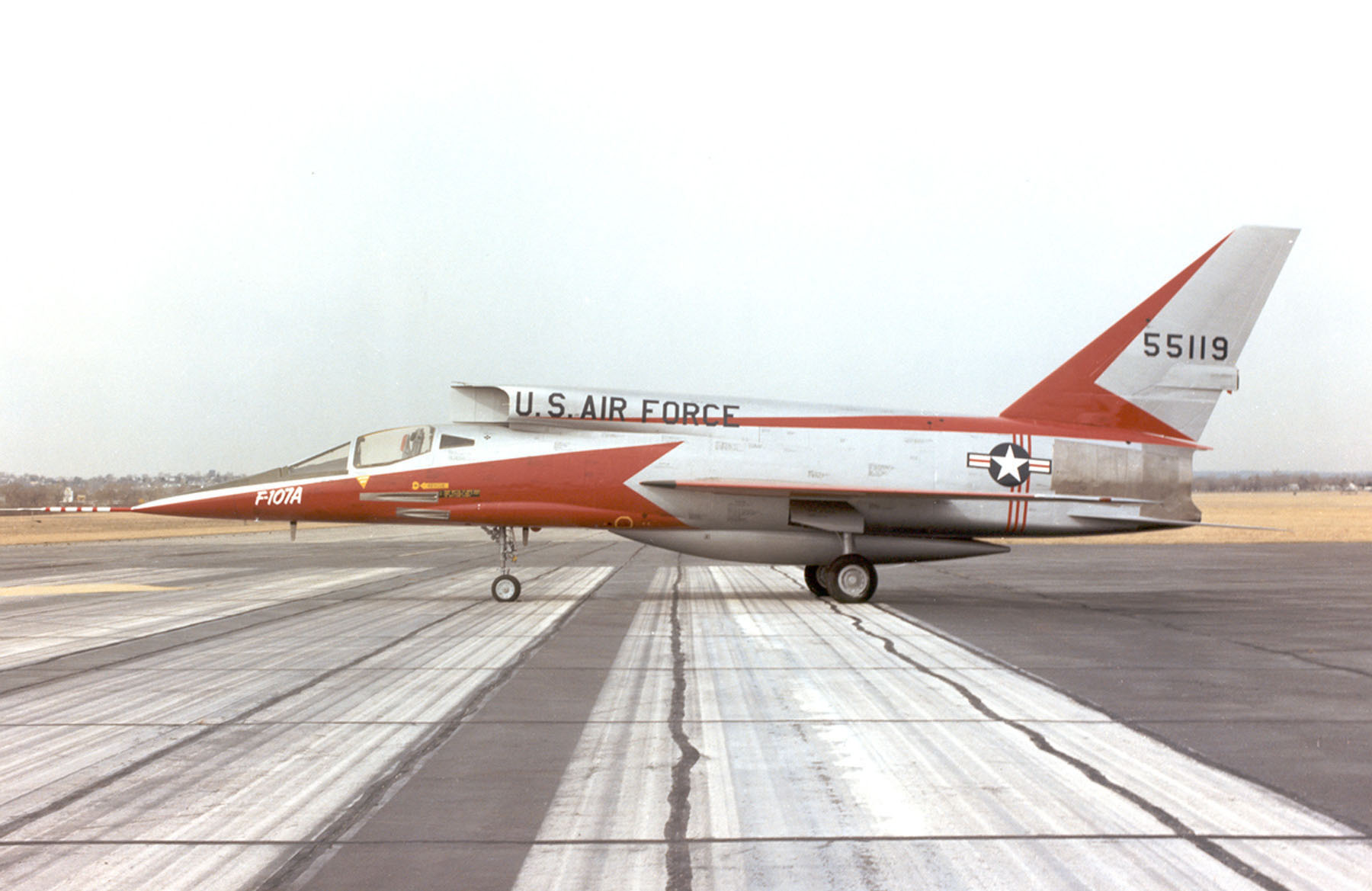
A side-view of North American F-107A #2 55-5119 at the NMUSAF.

The aircraft's most distinguishing feature is its dorsal-mounted variable-area inlet duct (VAID). While the VAID was at the time a system unique to the F-107A, it is now considered to be an early form of variable geometry intake ramp which automatically controlled the amount of air fed to the jet engine. Although the preliminary design of the air intake was originally located in a chin position under the fuselage like the Vought F-8 Crusader, the air intake was eventually mounted in an unconventional position directly above and just behind the cockpit. The VAID system proved to be very efficient and NAA used the design concept on its A-5 Vigilante, XB-70 Valkyrie and XF-108 Rapier designs.

The air intake was in the unusual dorsal location as the Air Force had required the carriage of an underbelly semi-conformal nuclear weapon. The intake also severely limited rear visibility. Nonetheless, this was not considered very important for a tactical fighter-bomber aircraft at that time, and furthermore it was assumed that air combat would be via guided missile exchanges outside visual range.

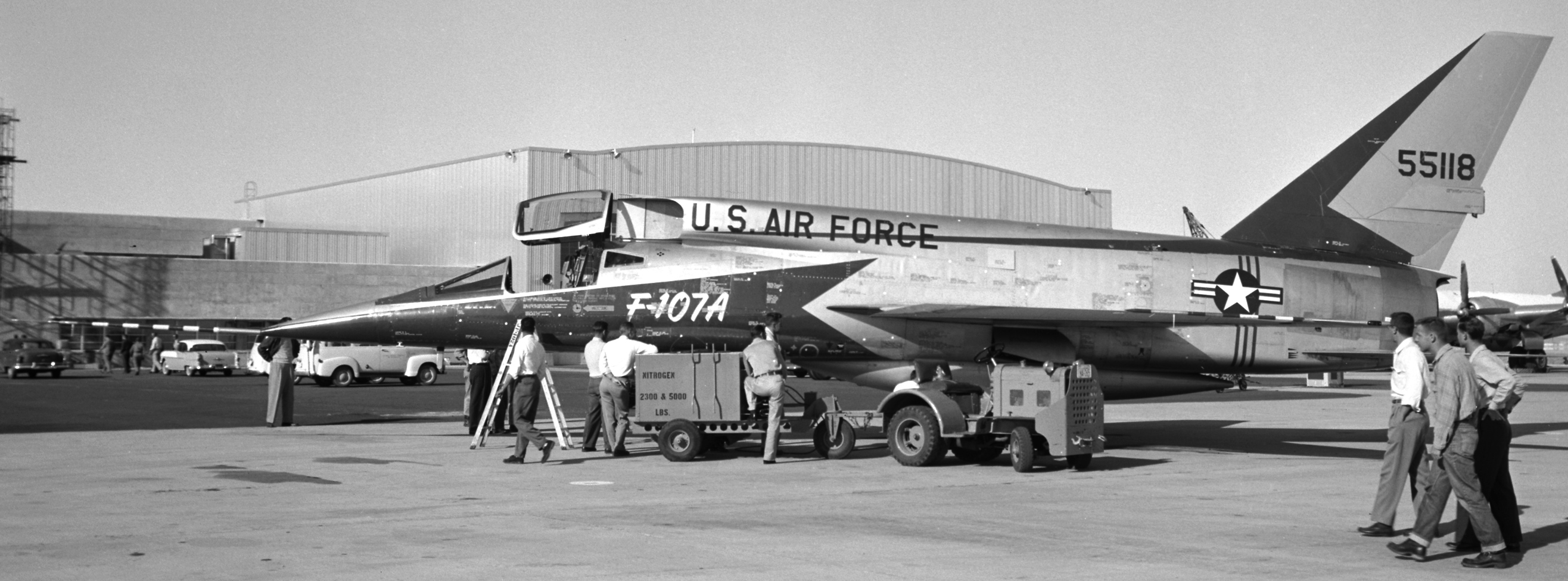
The first F-107A 55-5118 with its vertically sliding canopy in open position.

In an emergency, the ejection seat was designed to blast directly through the non-jettisoning canopy and bring the pilot swiftly clear of the air intakes. In non-emergency operation, the canopy opened by sliding vertically upwards via guide mechanism, rather than the typical arrangement of a hinged or horizontally sliding canopy.

A two-seat version of the F-107 was proposed by North American, which seated both crewmembers under a single canopy in an extended forward fuselage, but none were built.

In August 1954, a contract was signed for three prototypes along with a pre-production order for six additional airframes.

In the end however, the United States Air Force decided to purchase the Republic F-105 Thunderchief after heavy consideration for the F-107 program.

=== Designation and names ===
Extensive design changes resulted in its redesignation from F-100B to F-107A before the first prototype flew. The F-107 was never given an official name, but was sometimes informally called the "Super Super Sabre" referring to North American's earlier fighter design, the F-100 Super Sabre. The designation "F-107A" was the only one assigned to the aircraft, though "YF-107A" is often used in publications. The aircraft is also informally called the "Ultra Sabre".

== Operational history ==
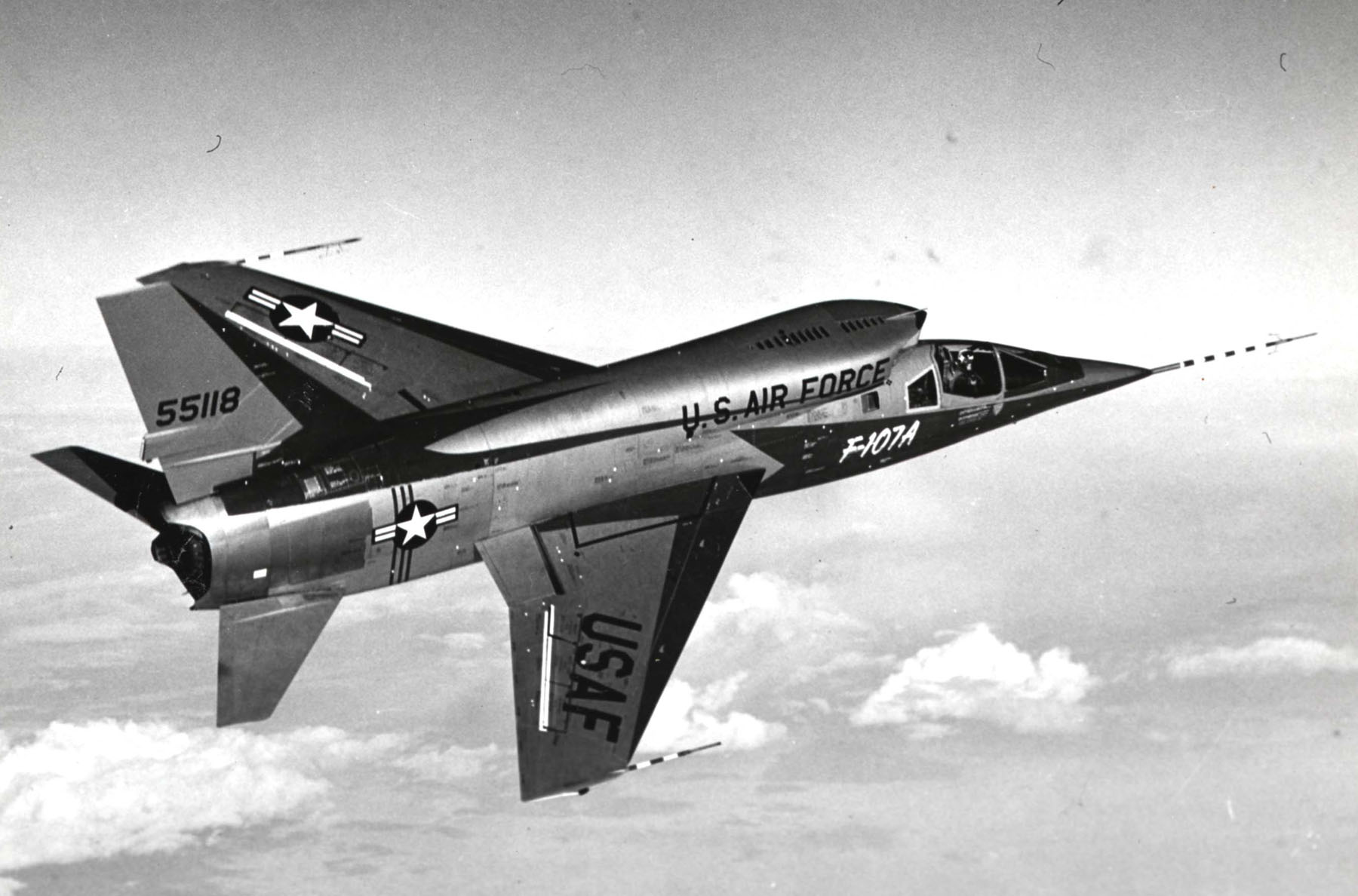
North American F-107A #1 55-5118

The first F-107A (serial number 55-5118) with North American's chief test pilot Bob Baker at the controls, made its initial flight on 10 September 1956, attaining Mach 1.03. After the successful test flight, the brakechute did not deploy, which resulted in a "hot" landing with the nose gear strut breaking. The aircraft first achieved Mach 2 in tests on 3 November 1956.

It was joined by the second F-107A (55-5119), which made its first flight on 28 November 1956. It was used for weapons testing with both conventional and atomic bombs. The last prototype, (55-5120) had its maiden flight on 10 December 1956. At the conclusion of the F-107A's successful test program, the Tactical Air Command decided to hold a fly-off competition between the F-107A and the Republic F-105 which was designed to have the same mission requirements and use the same engine. Although the competition was close, the F-105 was selected as the new standard TAC tactical fighter. The three F-107A prototypes were relegated to test flying and the pre-production order was cancelled.

In late 1957, prototypes #1 (55-5118) and #3 (55-5120) were leased to the National Advisory Committee for Aeronautics (NACA) for high-speed flight research. Aircraft #1 is now in the collection of the Pima Air & Space Museum. In September 1959, with Scott Crossfield at the controls, aircraft #3 was damaged during an aborted takeoff. The aircraft was not repaired and, ultimately, used for fire fighting training and was destroyed in the early 1960s. (55-5120 was also noted to be stored in poor condition in the Tallmantz collection at Orange County Airport California in September 1970.)

Prototype #2 (55-5119) was not used by NACA and flown on 25 November 1957 to the National Museum of the United States Air Force at Wright-Patterson Air Force Base near Dayton, Ohio.

== Variants ==
NA-212
North American design or charge number.
F-100B
Original military designation for the NA-212, not used
F-107A
Military designation for nine prototype NA-212s ordered, only three built.
FJ-5
Proposal by North American in July 1955 for a navalised F-107 powered by a General Electric J79 turbojet; a proposal was made to build a prototype with the wing of an FJ-4 Fury. Not taken up.

== Aircraft on display ==
- 55-5118 – Pima Air and Space Museum, adjacent to Davis-Monthan AFB in Tucson, Arizona.
- 55-5119 –Currently in storage at the National Museum of the United States Air Force at Wright-Patterson AFB near Dayton, Ohio.

== Specifications (F-107A) ==
Data from Simone and Pace.

General characteristics

- Crew: one
- Length: 61 ft 10 in (18.85 m)
- Wingspan: 36 ft 7 in (11.15 m)
- Height: 19 ft 8 in (5.89 m)
- Wing area: 376 sq ft (35 m^{2})
- Empty weight: 22,696 lb (10,295 kg)
- Gross weight: 39,755 lb (18,033 kg)
- Max takeoff weight: 41,537 lb (18,841 kg)
- Powerplant: 1 × Pratt & Whitney YJ75-P-9 turbojet, 24,500 lbf (109 kN) thrust

Performance

- Maximum speed: 1,295 mph (2,084 km/h, 1,125 kn)
- Maximum speed: Mach 2
- Range: 2,428 mi (3,885 km, 2,109 nmi)
- Service ceiling: 53,200 ft (16,220 m)
- Rate of climb: 39,900 ft/min (203 m/s)
- Wing loading: 106 lb/sq ft (516 kg/m^{2})
- Thrust/weight: 0.62

Armament

- Guns: 4x 20 mm Pontiac M39 cannon OR 1x 20 mm, 6 barrel M61 Vulcan autocannon
- Bombs: 10,000 lb (4,500 kg) on 5 hardpoints; 2 under each wing, 1 semi-recessed ordnance station under fuselage centerline. Wide variety of ordnance, including tactical nuclear weapons

== See also ==
Related development

- North American F-100 Super Sabre

Aircraft of comparable role, configuration, and era

- McDonnell Douglas F-4 Phantom II
- Republic F-105 Thunderchief

Related lists

- List of fighter aircraft
- List of military aircraft of the United States
