= Douglas C-132 =

Proposed American military transport aircraft

C-132
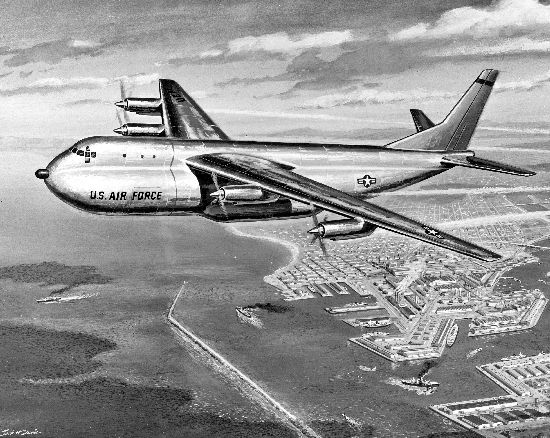
- Artist's concept of the C-132

General information
- Type: Cargo transport
- National origin: United States
- Manufacturer: Douglas Aircraft Company
- Status: Cancelled in 1957
- Primary user: United States Air Force (intended)
- Number built: 0

History
- Developed from: C-124 Globemaster II

The Douglas C-132 was an American military transport aircraft proposed in the 1950s by the Douglas Aircraft Company, based on the company's C-124 Globemaster II. The C-132 would have been the largest aircraft of its era.

== Development ==
In January 1951, the United States Air Force (USAF) issued a request for a preliminary design of a heavy cargo transport aircraft. The aircraft needed the ability to transport 100,000 pounds (45,000 kilograms) of payload 4,000 miles (6,500 kilometers; 3,500 nautical miles). By December 1952, the USAF selected a proposal from the Douglas Aircraft Company, which would serve as a cargo transport and as an air-to-air refueling tanker. The Douglas design was given the designation of C-132 by April 1953, and a mockup of the C-132 was built in February 1954. Douglas announced in December 1954 that the C-132 would be powered by the Pratt & Whitney T57 engine, a new turboprop in the 15,000 equivalent shaft horsepower (11,000 kilowatts) class. The T57 would be flight tested on a Douglas C-124 Globemaster II testbed aircraft. The USAF expected the T57 engine to be flown experimentally within two years, and it hoped the engine would be operational within five years.

At about the same time, USAF leadership began speaking about a turboprop aircraft that could transport 80 short tons (160,000 lb; 73,000 kg) across the Atlantic Ocean in ten hours. The next month, the USAF confirmed that the C-132 was the aircraft with that capability, which meant the C-132 would have more payload capacity than three Douglas C-124Bs, then the largest cargo transport aircraft. In November 1955, the USAF announced that the mockup would be moved from Douglas's main Santa Monica, California factory to its Tulsa, Oklahoma plant, where production of the C-132 would occur if a production contract was awarded. The mockup was set up in the Tulsa factory by January 1956. While the move was being made, flight testing of the T57 engine was planned for early 1956, but the engine did not fly until early autumn of 1956. In its May 1956 congressional testimony, the USAF praised the C-132 tankering capabilities, including its large capacity, low cargo costs per ton-mile, and ability to fly at high altitudes, but it then canceled the tanker version of the aircraft in mid-1956. The USAF offered more details about the C-132 in October, now describing an overload payload of 200,000 lb (91,000 kg), a cruise speed of Mach 0.8, and a maximum speed higher than Mach 0.9. Another report at the beginning of November stated that Douglas had begun "cutting tin" on the C-132, which was described as a 430-knot (500-mile-per-hour; 800-kilometer-per-hour) aircraft with a payload capacity of 150,000 lb (68,000 kg) and the ability to carry 300-400 troops or passengers.

First flight was originally planned for April 1957, but the target slipped to mid-1959. The USAF had planned to buy 30 aircraft, and they would be delivered at an annual rate of six aircraft, beginning in early 1961.

On February 14, 1957, the USAF issued a news release describing the C-132 as the new "giant of the airways," which would weigh over 500,000 lb (230,000 kg), carry 200,000 pounds, travel at a cruise speed faster than 400 kn (460 mph; 740 km/h), transport a 28-short-ton (56,000 lb; 25,000 kg) light tank, and have the ability to take off and land on conventional-length runways through its undercarriage setup of two nose wheels and 16 main landing gear wheels. The news release, which was carried widely in American mass-circulation newspapers and magazines, also had photographs of the C-132 mockup in Tulsa. However, the USAF retracted its statement five days later, saying that it only had a development contract with Douglas to build two C-132 prototypes, and that it was considering the termination of the project. The unauthorized news release embarrassed the USAF, since the upcoming fiscal 1958 defense budget contained almost no money for new transport aircraft. In its retraction, the USAF did not mention that on December 31, 1956, it had already sent a report to the United States Congress, informing them of its decision to remove the C-132 from its aircraft program.

The project was officially cancelled on March 20, 1957, after $104 million had been allocated and $70 million of non-recoverable costs had been spent on the program. Oklahoma's congressional delegation pushed back against the cancellation, and Douglas publicly campaigned for C-132 funding restoration to improve the nation's airlift capability and allow for long-range transport of intercontinental ballistic missiles. Douglas also denied rumors that problems with the development of the engine caused the cancellation. Douglas did not respond to assertions that budget restrictions and increasing requirements from the Strategic Air Command were responsible, although in June 1956, a former USAF research and development official testified to the United States Senate that C-132 program initiation was withheld for two years, even after they had determined that the engine development risk was manageable enough to support the program's go-ahead. However, the project was not revived. No prototype was built, and the project did not get past the mockup stage.

== Design ==
The C-132 was to be powered by four 15,000 shaft horsepower (11,000 kW) Pratt & Whitney T57 turboprops, mounted on a swept wing. The T57 was to be the most powerful turboprop engine in existence at the time. It also would have used the largest propeller at the time, the 20-foot diameter (6.1-meter) Hamilton Standard B48P6A propeller. The T57 turboprops provided 5,000 pounds-force (22 kilonewtons; 2,300 kilograms-force) of residual jet thrust. The XKC-132 air refueling version would only have utilized the probe and drogue (P&D) air refueling system. That system, used primarily by the US Navy, did not find favor with the USAF. Projected speed was to be 418 kn (481 mph; 774 km/h) with a range of 2,500 mi (4,100 km; 2,200 nmi) and a maximum payload of 137,000 lb (62,000 kg).

The C-132 was a triple-decker aircraft with a cargo space measuring 95 ft (29 m) long, 17 ft (5.2 m) wide, and 12 1/2 ft (3.8 m) high. The main cargo hold had a usable volume of 15,662 cubic feet (443.5 cubic meters). The aircraft had a dual wheel nose landing gear, while the main landing gear had 16 wheels arranged in two coaxial quadruple wheel units that operate in tandem under each side of the fuselage.

== Specifications (C-132) ==
Data from McDonnell Douglas aircraft since 1920 : Volume I, The Encyclopedia of World Aircraft

General characteristics

- Crew: Pilot, co-pilot, navigator, systems engineer, and 3-member relief team
- Capacity: 800 troops
- Length: 183 ft 10 in (56.03 m)
- Wingspan: 186 ft 8 in (56.90 m)
- Wing area: 4,201 sq ft (390.3 m^{2})
- Max takeoff weight: 389,500 lb (176,674 kg) cargo configuration

469,225 lb (212,837 kg) tanker configuration

- Powerplant: 4 × Pratt & Whitney T57-P-1 turboprop engines, 15,000 shp (11,000 kW) each
- Propellers: 4-bladed Hamilton Standard Model B48P6A hollow-steel, single-rotation, constant-speed fully-feathering reversible propellers, 20 ft (6.1 m) diameter
  - Maximum blade chord: 22 in (56 cm)
  - Length: 5 ft 6 in (1.7 m)
  - Weight: 3,600 lb (1,600 kg)

Performance

- Cruise speed: 460 mph (740 km/h, 400 kn) or more for the cargo transport version; 512 mph (824 km/h; 445 kn) at 20,000 ft (6,100 m) altitude for the tanker version
- Range: 2,950 mi (4,750 km, 2,560 nmi) carrying 175,000 lb (79,000 kg) of cargo; 3,500 mi (5,600 km; 3,000 nmi) carrying 100,000 lb (45,000 kg) of cargo
- Combat range: 2,475 mi (3,983 km, 2,151 nmi) transferring 19,550 US gal (16,280 imp gal; 74,000 L) of fuel
- Service ceiling: 39,000 ft (12,000 m)

== See also ==
Related development

- C-74 Globemaster – US military transport aircraft with 4 piston engines, 1945
- C-124 Globemaster II – American heavy lift military aircraft with 4 piston engines, 1946

Aircraft of comparable role, configuration, and era

- Antonov An-22 – Soviet heavy military transport aircraft
- Tupolev Tu-115 – Soviet long-range turboprop airliner

== Bibliography ==
- Witze, Claude (January 1961). "Challenge to Aviation in the Cold War". Air Force and Space Digest. Vol. 44, no. 1. pp. 43–47. ISSN 0002-2349.
- Spore, John B. (September 1958). "What About Airlift?". The Current Scene. Army. Vol. 9, no. 2. Association of the United States Army (AUSA). pp. 22–24. ISSN 0004-2455.
- Inquiry into Satellite and Missile Programs. Pt. 1–3 (Report). December 1957 – January 1958. pp. 532-533, 1234-1237, 1899-1910. hdl:2027/umn.31951d02098000h.
- Haggerty, James J. Jr. (March 5, 1957). "Douglas XC-132: Your First Look at the World's Largest Airplane". Look magazine. Vol. 21. pp. 82–84. ISSN 0024-6336.
- "Russ-wary Air Force Booms Air Cargo Fleet". Indianapolis Star. Washington, D.C. United Press. December 17, 1954. p. 14. ISSN 1930-2533 – via Newspapers.com.
