= Pratt & Whitney J75 =

Turbojet engine

J75 / JT4A
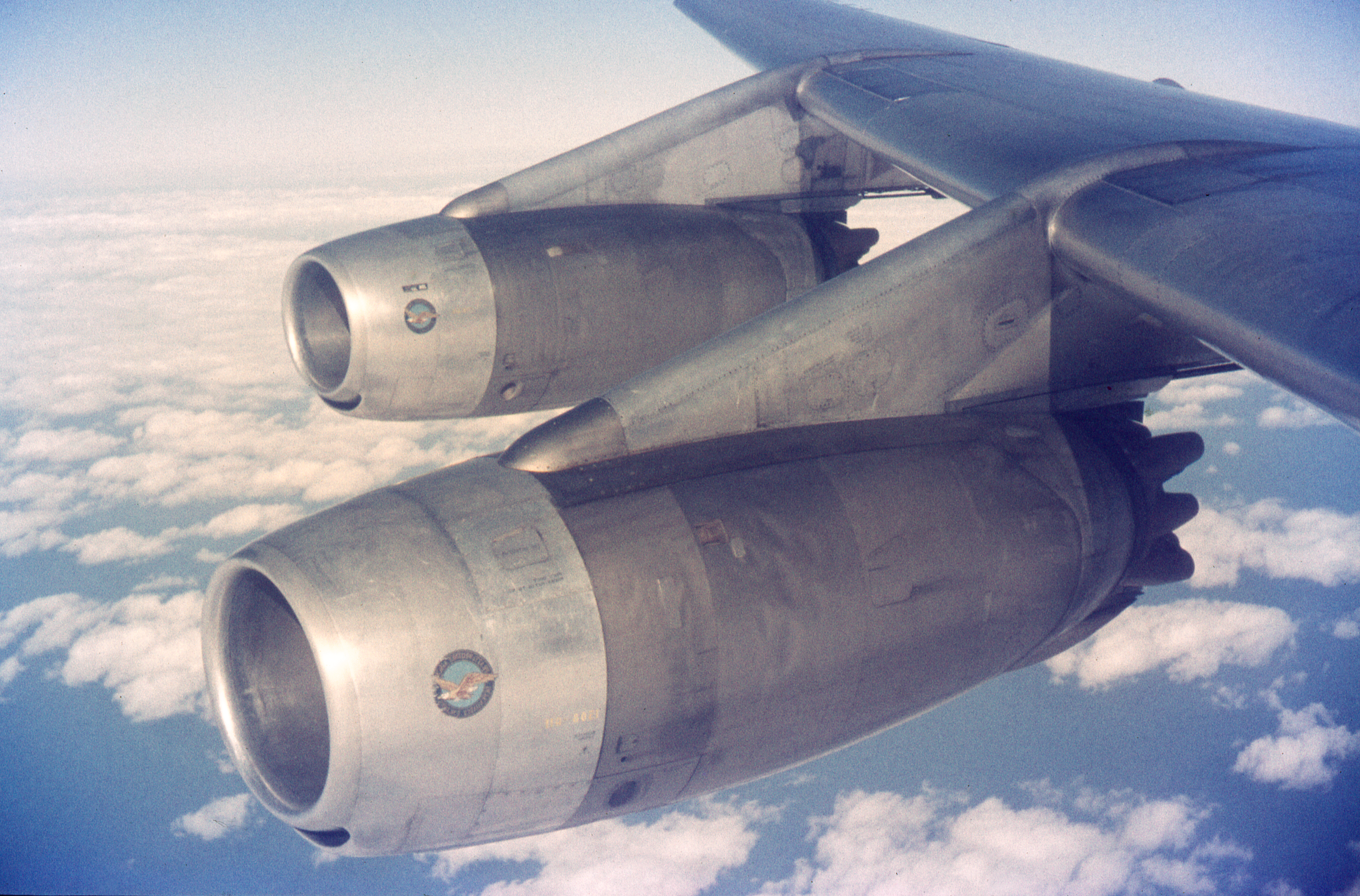
- Two JT4As installed on a KLM DC-8 with hush kits installed.
- Type: Turbojet
- National origin: United States
- Manufacturer: Pratt & Whitney
- First run: 1955
- Major applications: Boeing 707; Convair F-106 Delta Dart; Douglas DC-8; Lockheed U-2; Republic F-105 Thunderchief
- Developed from: Pratt & Whitney J57
- Developed into: Pratt & Whitney FT4

The Pratt & Whitney J75 (civilian designation: JT4A) is an axial-flow turbojet engine first flown in 1955. A two-spool design in the 17,000 lbf (76 kN) thrust class, the J75 was essentially the bigger brother of the Pratt & Whitney J57 (JT3C). It was known in civilian service as the JT4A, and in a variety of stationary roles as the FT4.

== Design and development ==
In military use, the J75 was used on the Convair F-106 Delta Dart, Lockheed U-2, and Republic F-105 Thunderchief. It was also utilized in the prototype and experimental Avro Canada CF-105 Arrow, Lockheed A-12, Martin P6M-2 SeaMaster, North American YF-107, and Vought XF8U-3 Crusader III.

Before the arrival of the Pratt & Whitney JT3D turbofan engine, the JT4A was used to power certain Boeing 707 and Douglas DC-8 models, bringing improved field performance in the medium-range Boeing 707-220 and Douglas DC-8-20, and intercontinental range in the Boeing 707-320 and the Douglas DC-8-30. By late 1959, P&W had considered introducing a turbofan version of the J75, which was to have tentatively been named the TF75 or JT4D. Apparently, little interest was shown by the aircraft industry, so the variant was dropped.

=== Marine & power generation ===
After its relatively short lifetime in the aircraft role, the JT4A found more enduring use in the naval role, where the FT4 was produced in a variety of models between 18,000 and 22,000 hp (13 and 16 MW). Well-known uses include the first all-turbine warships, the Canadian Iroquois-class destroyers, as well as the United States Coast Guard's Hamilton-class cutters, the 1970s-built icebreakers Polar Sea and Polar Star (each 3 engines in CODOG configuration), and it was considered for the US Navy's Asheville-class gunboat. The same basic powerplant saw much wider use as a peak demand power turbine running on natural gas. From its introduction in 1960 over 1,000 FT4s have been sold, with many of them still in operation for electrical generation. Outdated by modern standards, refits are available that add catalytic converters to lower their emissions.

== Variants ==
Thrust given in pounds-force (lbf) and kilonewtons (kN).

J75-P-1
J75-P-3
16,470 lbf (73.26 kN)
J75-P-5
17,200 lbf (76.51 kN)
J75-P-9
J75-P-11
J75-P-13B
17,000 lbf (75.62 kN)
J75-P-15W
24,500 lbf (108.98 kN) afterburning
J75-P-17
24,500 lbf (108.98 kN) afterburning
J75-P-19
24,500 lbf (108.98 kN) afterburning
J75-P-19W
26,500 lbf (117.88 kN) afterburning with water injection
JT4A-3
15,800 lbf (70.28 kN)
JT4A-4
15,800 lbf (70.28 kN)
JT4A-9
16,800 lbf (74.73 kN)
JT4A-11
17,500 lbf (77.84 kN)
JT4A-29
(J75-P-19W) 26,500 lbf (117.88 kN) afterburning with water injection

== Applications ==
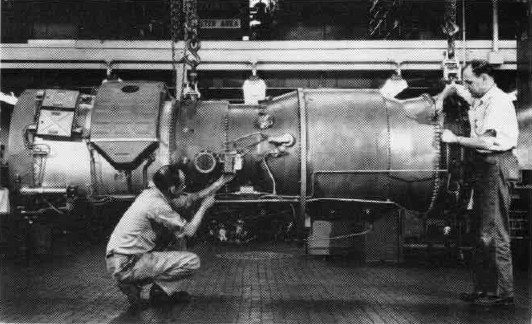
A US Navy J75 used in the P6M-2 Seamaster

J75

- Avro Canada CF-105 Mk1 Arrow (interim for test flights)
- Convair F-106 Delta Dart
- Lockheed A-12 (interim for test flights)
- Lockheed U-2
- Martin P6M-2 SeaMaster
- North American F-107
- Republic F-105 Thunderchief
- Vought XF8U-3 Crusader III

JT4A

- Boeing 707 (specifically, the 707-220 and 707-320)
- Douglas DC-8 (specifically, the DC-8-20 and DC-8-30)

== Specifications (JT4A-11) ==
Data from Jane's All the World's Aircraft 1962-63, Aircraft engines of the World 1966/67, Flight:Aero Engines 1960

==== General characteristics ====
- Type: turbojet
- Length: 144.1 in (3,660 mm)
- Diameter: 43 in (1,092 mm)
- Dry weight: 5,100 lb (2,313.3 kg)

==== Components ====
- Compressor: 2-spool axial compressor
  - LP compressor: 8-stage axial (4 stages titanium, 4 stages steel)
  - HP compressor: 7-stage axial compressor
- Combustors: cannular with 8 burner cans in an annular combustion chamber
- Turbine: 2-spool axial turbine
  - HP turbine: 1-stage axial
  - LP turbine: 2-stage axial
- Fuel type: Jet A-1 / ASTM A-1 / MIL-J-5624 / JP-1 / JP-4
- Oil system: return pressure spray system at 45 psi (310 kPa)

==== Performance ====
- Maximum thrust: 17,500 lbf (77.84 kN) at 6,720 rpm LP for take-off
- Overall pressure ratio: 12.5:1
- Air mass flow: 256 lb/s (7,000 kg/min) at 8,975 rpm HP
- Specific fuel consumption: 0.74 lb/(lbf⋅h) or 21 g/(kN⋅s) at maximum continuous rpm
- Thrust-to-weight ratio: 3.147

== See also ==
Related development

- Pratt & Whitney JT3C/J57
- Pratt & Whitney JT3D/TF33
- Pratt & Whitney FT4

Comparable engines

- Orenda Iroquois
- Rolls-Royce Olympus

Related lists

- List of aircraft engines
