= Pratt & Whitney J52 =

Turbojet aircraft engine

J52/JT8A
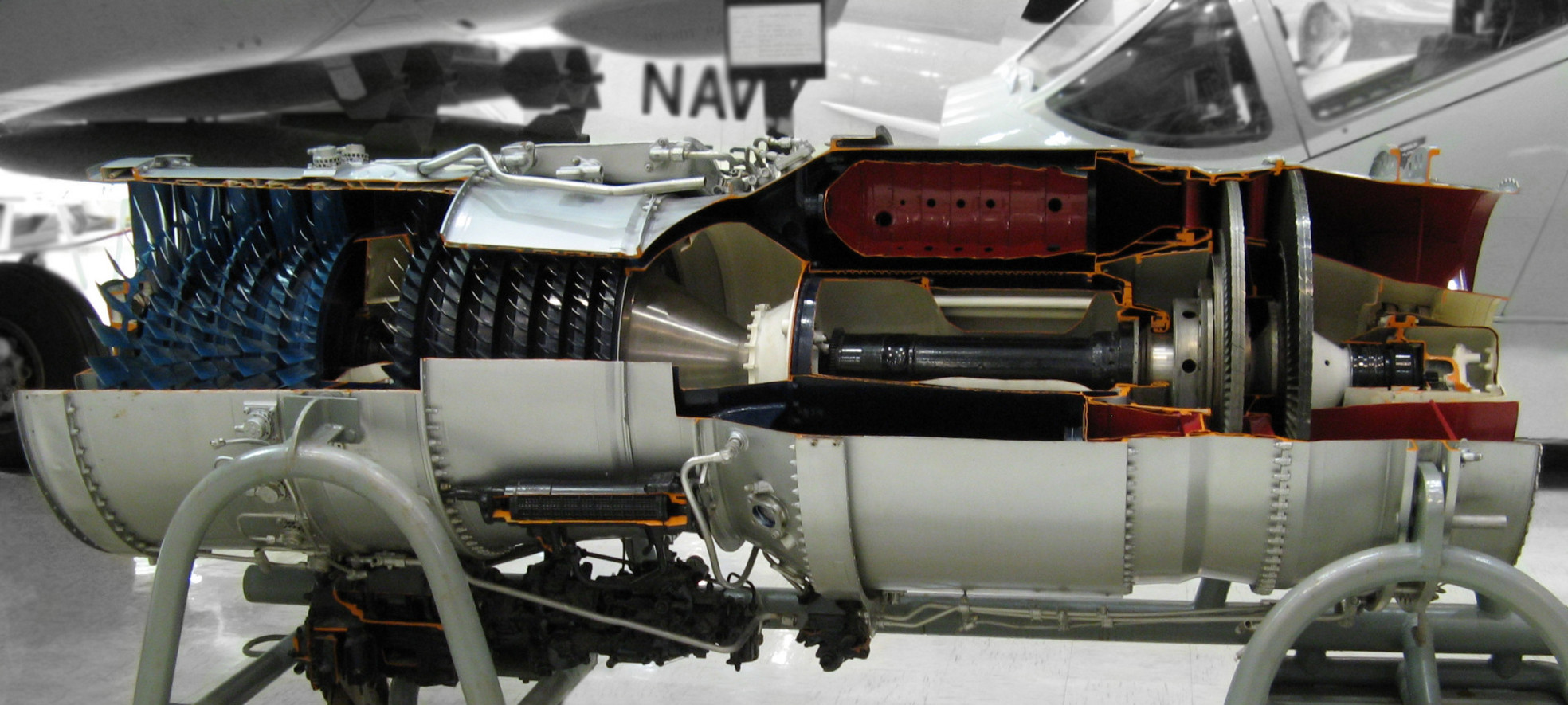
- A J52 cut-out showing its two spools
- Type: Turbojet
- National origin: United States
- Manufacturer: Pratt & Whitney
- First run: 1955
- Major applications: Douglas A-4 Skyhawk; Grumman A-6 Intruder; Northrop Grumman EA-6B Prowler
- Number built: >5,000
- Developed from: Pratt & Whitney J57
- Developed into: Pratt & Whitney JT8D

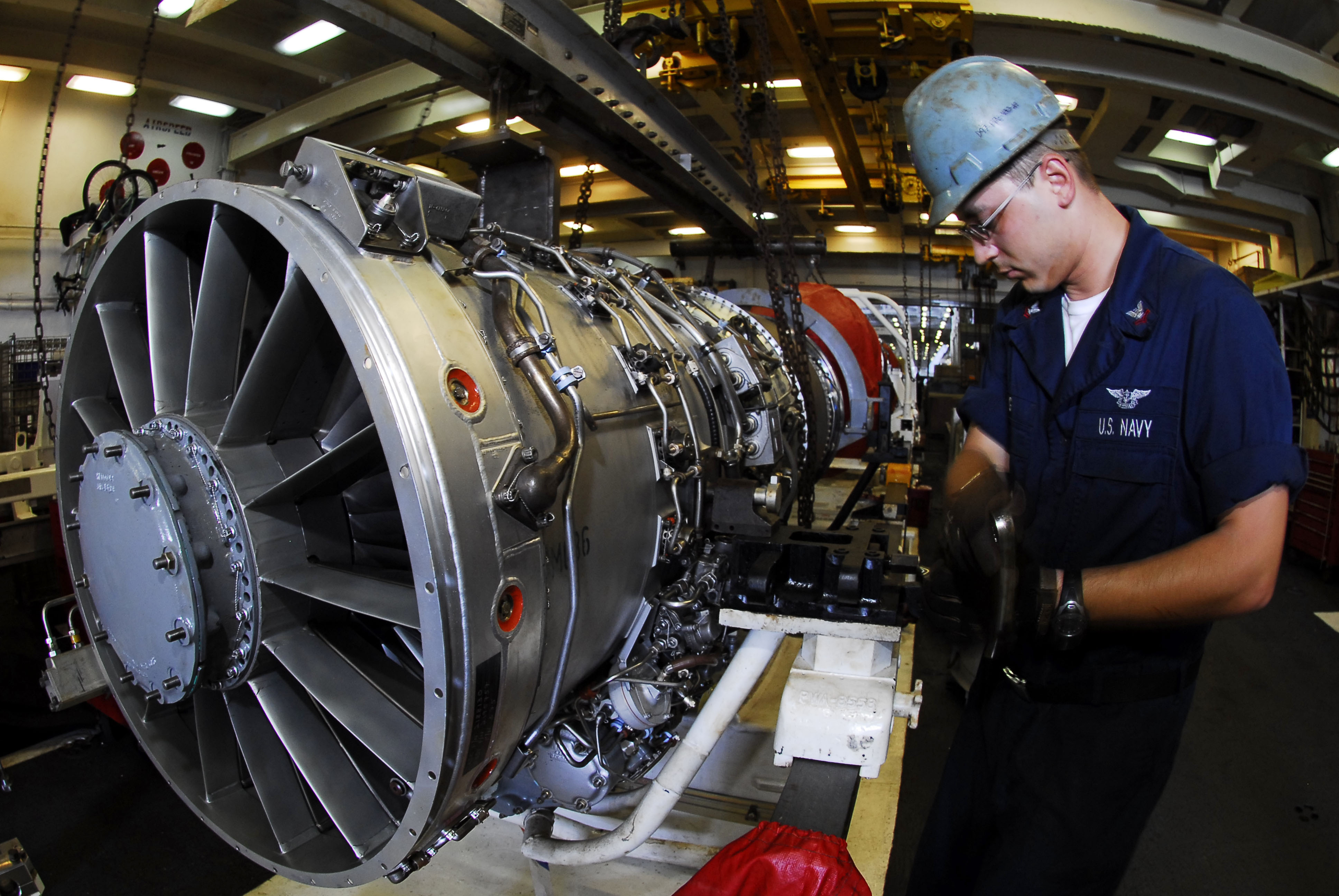
P&W J52-P-408 being worked on in the USS Kitty Hawk's jet shop

The Pratt & Whitney J52 (company designation JT8A) is an axial-flow dual-spool turbojet engine originally designed for the United States Navy, in the 40 kN (9,000 lbf) class. It powered the A-6 Intruder and the AGM-28 Hound Dog cruise missile. As of 2021 the engine was still in use in models of the A-4 Skyhawk.

The engine is the basis for the Pratt & Whitney JT8D, a popular civilian low-bypass turbofan engine.

== Design and development ==
The J52 was developed in the mid-1950s for the US Navy as a scaled-down derivative of the J57/JT3A. It was initially intended to power the A4D-3 Skyhawk, an advanced avionics model that was canceled in 1957. After being canceled, the U.S. Air Force selected the J52 to power the AGM-28 Hound Dog cruise missile. The engine was designed with several unique features for this application, including a "conical centerbody mounted in the intake" and a "variable central plug ... in the nozzle". Then, in 1958, the US Navy selected the engine to power what became the A-6 Intruder.

The J52-P-6 model, designed for the YA2F-1 (YA-6A) Intruder, had a unique nozzle that could be angled downward at 23 degrees for STOL takeoffs; this was not used on production A-6s. Returning full circle, the J52 was selected to power the A4D-5, another model of the A-4 Skyhawk, remaining in all subsequent new-built models.

The twin-spool J52 employs a split 12-stage axial compressor consisting of a five-stage low pressure unit and a seven-stage high pressure unit. Behind the compressor is a nine-unit can-annular combustion chamber and a two-stage split turbine.

== Operational history ==
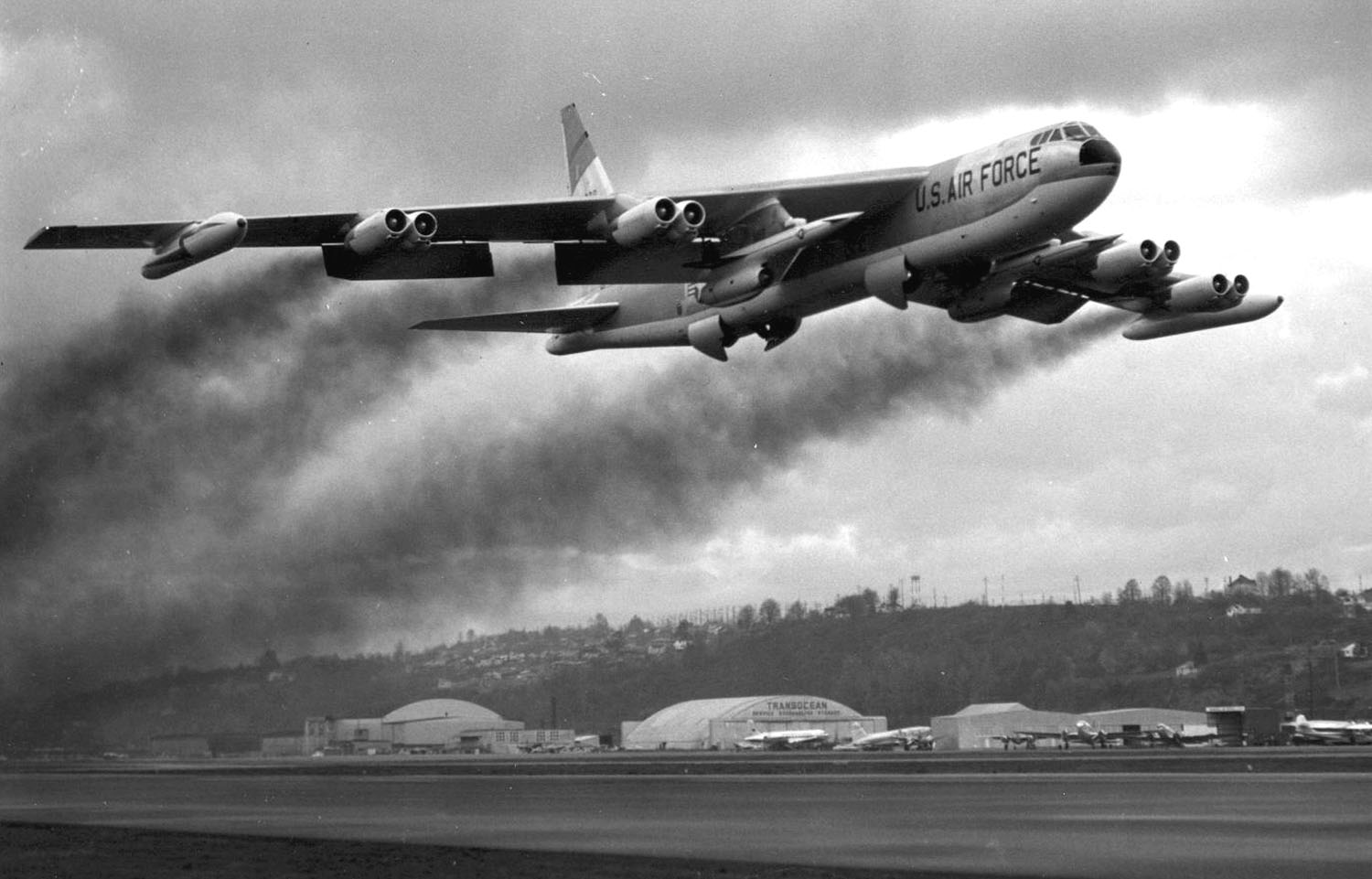
B-52F takeoff with J52-powered AGM-28 Hound Dog missiles

In 1960, U.S. Air Force's Strategic Air Command (SAC) developed procedures so that the Boeing B-52 Stratofortress could use the Hound Dog's J52 engine for additional thrust while the missile was located on the bomber's two pylons. This helped heavily laden B-52s fly away from their airbases faster, which would have been useful in case of nuclear attacks on the bases. The Hound Dog could then be refueled from the B-52's wing fuel tanks.

== Variants ==
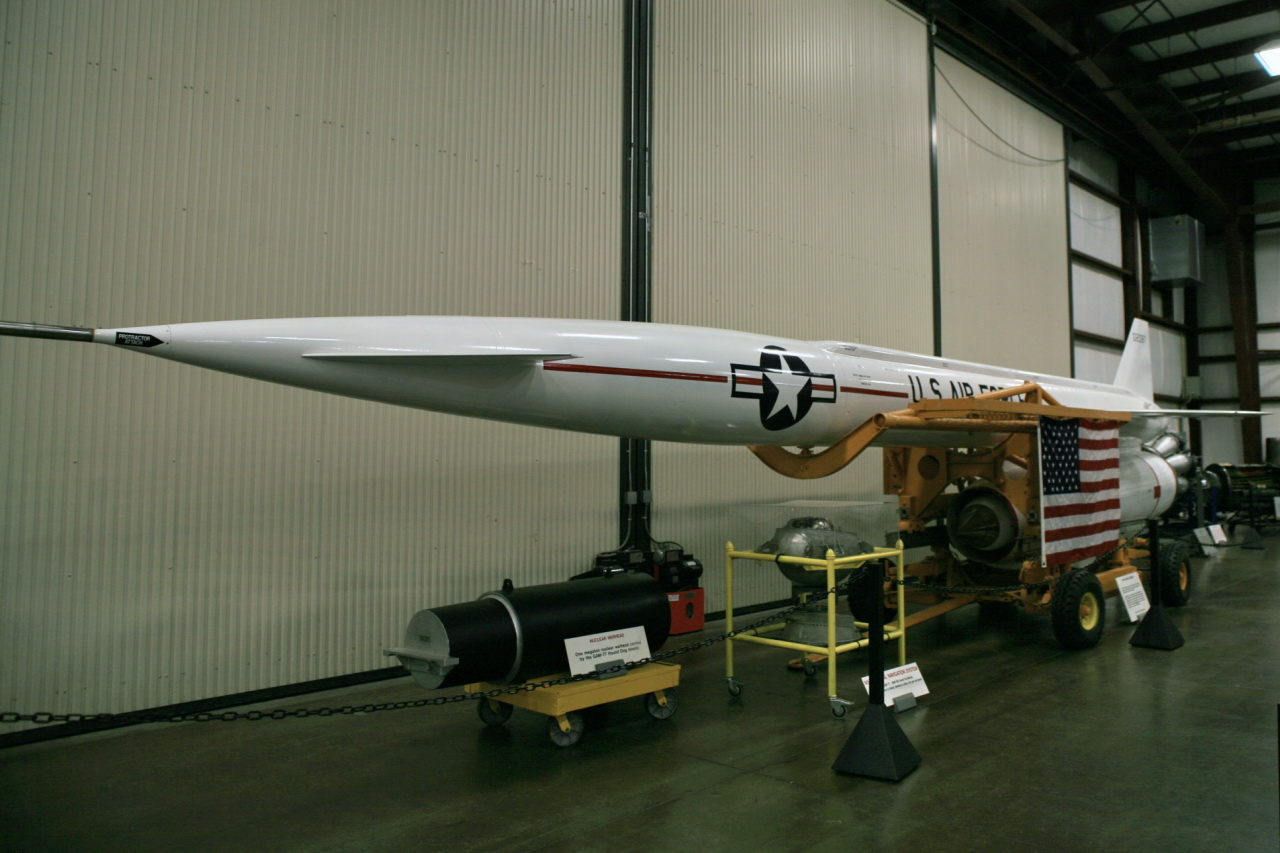
AGM-28 Hound Dog nuclear cruise missile, powered by the J52-P-3 jet engine.

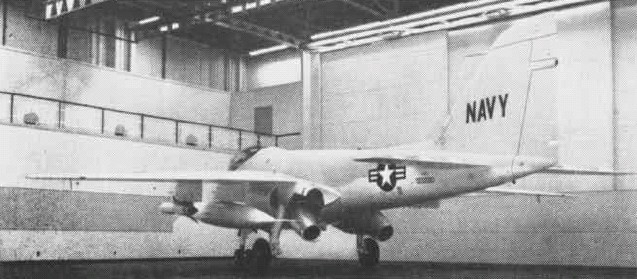
One of eight Grumman YA2F-1 Intruder prototypes, showing the original tiltable tailpipes.

Thrust given in foot-pounds (lbf) and kilonewtons (kN).

J52-P-3
7,500 lbf (33 kN) Flown in: AGM-28 Hound Dog. The design of the P-3 model included a variable inlet duct to improve engine efficiency at the various altitudes the cruise missile was designed to fly at.
J52-P-6
8,500 lbf (38 kN) Flown in: A-6A. Included a 23-degree downward swiveling nozzle
J52-P6A
8,500 lbf (38 kN) Flown in: A-4E, TA-4J, EA-6B (the first few)
J52-P-8A/B
9,300 lbf (41 kN) Flown in: A-4F/G/H/K, TA-4E/F/G/H, A-6E, EA-6B
J52-P-408
11,200 lbf (50 kN) Flown in: A-4M/N, TA-4KU, EA-6B. This variant included variable inlet guide vanes (VIGV) in the LPC, air-cooled turbine blades Still in operation with Argentina, Brazil, and Indonesia
J52-P-409
(PW1212) 12,000 lbf (53 kN) thrust version of the J52-P-408 with an improved low pressure turbine (LPT) and faster acceleration. Designed for the EA-6B and was additionally marketed as an upgrade for the A-4. The J52-P-409 was also proposed as a cost-effective upgrade to the A-6E as an alternative to the A-6F Intruder II, but was not purchased. The P-409 engine was also proposed for use in the EA-6B ADVCAP, but that program was canceled after three prototypes were built and flown. The P-409 would have been available as a new engine or as an upgrade kit for P-408 engines, but was never ordered in significant quantities.
PW1212
J52-P-409 re-designated
PW1216
16,000 lbf (71 kN) An afterburning derivative of the J52-P409 engine proposed for the Grumman Sabre II concept (the project later evolved into the JF-17 Thunder). The afterburner was designed in China
JT8A
Company designation for initial versions of the J52
JT8B-1
(J52-P-6 / P-6A)
JT8B-3
(J52-P-8A)

== Applications ==
- AGM-28 Hound Dog
- Dassault Super Mystère
- Douglas A-4 Skyhawk
- Grumman A-6 Intruder
- Lockheed Martin A-4AR Fightinghawk
- Northrop Grumman EA-6B Prowler
- LIMRV - On 14 August 1974, the LIMRV achieved a world record speed of 255.7 mph (411.5 km/h)

== Specifications (J52-P-408) ==
Data from Flight

==== General characteristics ====
- Type: turbojet
- Length: 118 in (300 cm)
- Diameter: 38 in (96.5 cm)
- Dry weight: 2,318 lb (1,052 kg)

==== Components ====
- Compressor: axial flow, 5-stage LP, 7-stage HP
- Turbine: single stage HP, single stage LP
- Fuel type: JP-4

==== Performance ====
- Maximum thrust: 11,200 lbf (50 kN)
- Overall pressure ratio: 14.6 : 1
- Air mass flow: 143 lb/s
- Specific fuel consumption: 0.79 lb/(lbf⋅h) (22 g/(kN⋅s))
- Thrust-to-weight ratio: 4.83

== See also ==
Related development

- Pratt & Whitney J57/JT3A
- Pratt & Whitney JT8D

Comparable engines

- Armstrong Siddeley Sapphire
- Rolls-Royce Avon

Related lists

- List of aircraft engines
