= 1952 Mount Gannett C-124 crash =

1952 aviation accident in Alaska, United States

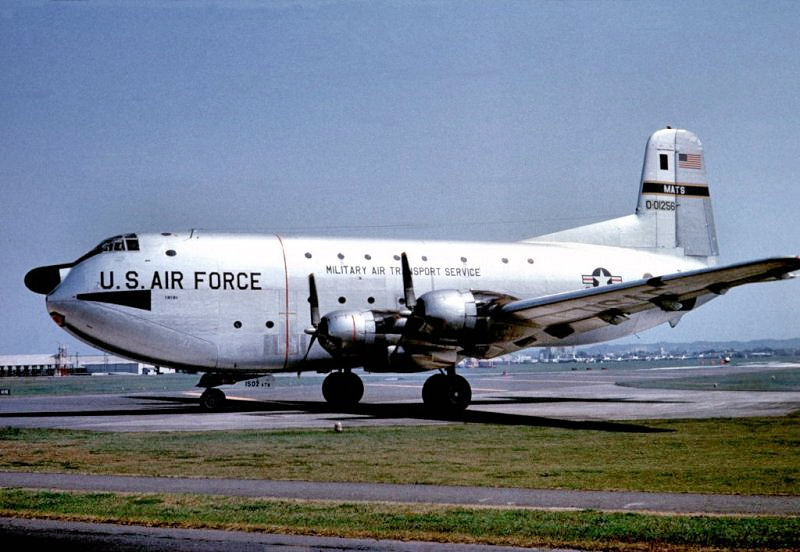
- A Douglas C-124 Globemaster II similar to the accident aircraft

Accident
- Date: November 22, 1952
- Summary: Controlled flight into mountainous terrain during approach in bad weather
- Site: Colony Glacier, Mount Gannett, Alaska, United States

Aircraft
- Aircraft type: Douglas C-124A-DL Globemaster II
- Operator: United States Air Force
- Registration: 51-0107
- Flight origin: McChord Air Force Base, Washington
- Destination: Elmendorf Air Force Base, Alaska
- Passengers: 41
- Crew: 11
- Fatalities: 52
- Survivors: 0

The 1952 Mount Gannett C-124 crash was an accident in which a Douglas C-124 Globemaster II military transport aircraft of the United States Air Force crashed into Mount Gannett, a peak in the Chugach Mountains in the American state of Alaska, on November 22, 1952. All of the 52 men on board were killed. Weather conditions at the time of the crash made search and recovery impossible. Six days after the crash, a survey of the site revealed eight feet of new snow and an avalanche had covered the crash site.

In 2012, the debris field was identified miles from the crash site. Since the discovery, recovery efforts had continued annually. By June 2025, 49 of the 52 persons had been identified. On January 7, 2026, the U.S. Air Force Mortuary Affairs Operations announced that remains of all 52 persons had been identified.

== Accident ==
The C-124 departed McChord Air Base in Washington state en route to Elmendorf Air Force Base near Anchorage, Alaska, with a crew of 11 and 41 Army and Air Force men. The flight was recorded as passing Middleton Island in the Gulf of Alaska. Around 4pm, a distress call was received by the pilot of a Northwest Orient Airlines passenger aircraft. The reception was very poor, but the Northwest captain made out the sentence: "As long as we have to land, we might as well land here." Weather near Elmendorf at the time was severe with heavy clouds, dense fog, and swirling snow which obscured visibility. The C-124 was flying without visual references, using just altitude, a radio beacon, and a stopwatch. There was no further communication from the C-124 and it failed to arrive at Elmendorf as scheduled.

The severe weather continued for three days, so searching was only able to begin on November 25. Thirty-two military aircraft searched the surrounding mountains and four Coast Guard vessels searched Prince William Sound. The wreckage of the aircraft was found on November 28, 1952, on the south side of Mount Gannett by Terris Moore from the Fairbanks Civil Air Patrol and Lieutenant Thomas Sullivan from the 10th Air Rescue Squadron. The pair spotted the tail section of the C-124 sticking out of the snow at an elevation of about 8,100 feet (2,500 m), close to the summit of Mount Gannett. Sullivan and Moore recorded the location as being on the Surprise Glacier, which flows south and empties into Harriman Fjord. However, the 2012 rediscovery of the remains of the aircraft at the foot of Colony Glacier, where it enters Lake George, suggests that the actual crash location was a little further north on the Mount Gannett ice field, sufficient for the debris to be carried 12 miles (19 km) down the north-flowing Colony Glacier over the subsequent 60 years.

Moore, who was a mountaineer and pilot as well as president of the University of Alaska, told journalists the C-124 "obviously was flying at full speed" and appeared to have slid down the cliffs of Mount Gannett and exploded. Wreckage was spread across several acres of the glacier. Moore surmised that the pilot had narrowly missed other Chugach Range peaks during his approach. "From this I conclude he was on instrument, flying blind, and probably crashed without any warning whatsoever to him directly into the southerly face of Mt. Gannett."

Moore reported finding blood on a blanket and noted the "sickly-sweet smell of death" at the site. It seemed clear that there were no survivors. Sullivan noted that recovery of remains would be very difficult as the glacier was already covered by fresh snow eight feet deep. Near the remains of the aircraft, drifted snow was piled up to hundreds of feet. Apparently, the crash had also triggered avalanches that had further buried the remains. Because of the difficult conditions, the recovery effort was terminated after a week and the victims' families were told they would have no remains to bury. The debris was then covered by snow and ice, and was lost for the next 60 years.

At the time, this was only the second fatal accident for the C-124, and was by far the worst. However, the following year saw even more deadly crashes at Moses Lake, Washington, and Tachikawa, Japan. Overall, this was the fourth-worst accident involving a Douglas C-124.

== Discovery of remains ==
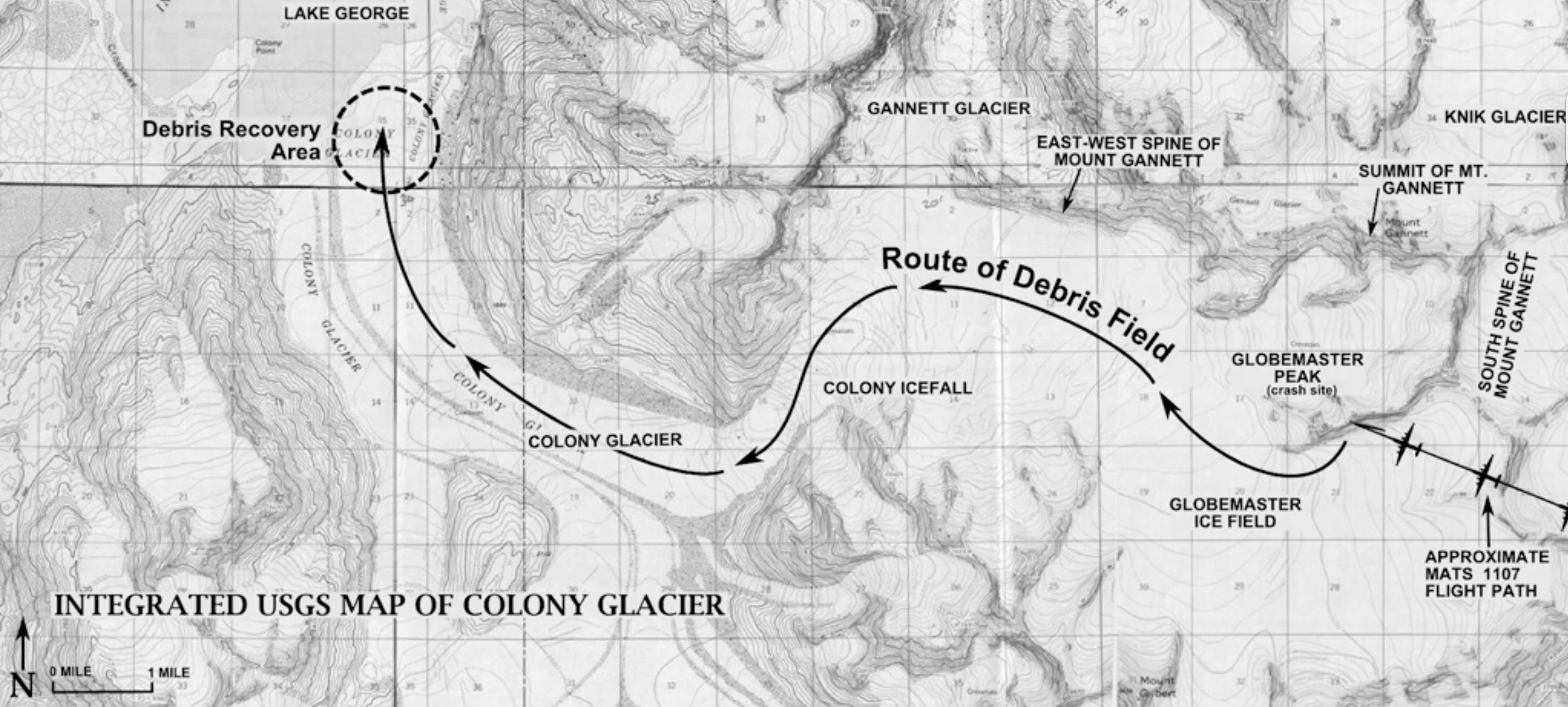
Route map of debris field from the 1952 crash of a C-124 Globemaster into Mount Gannett in Alaska.

On June 9, 2012, the crew of an Alaska Army National Guard helicopter on a training mission noticed a large yellow survival raft on the surface of the Colony Glacier above Inner Lake George. The site was nearly 14 miles from the 1952 crash location. The National Guard sent a team on foot to examine the site and they retrieved items that were identified as being from the crashed C-124. On June 13, 2012, Deputy Chief Rick Stone, J-2 Intelligence Directorate at the Joint POW/MIA Accounting Command, was assigned to investigate the wreckage.

On June 28, 2012, the US military announced the discovery of the wreckage.

== Recovery operations ==
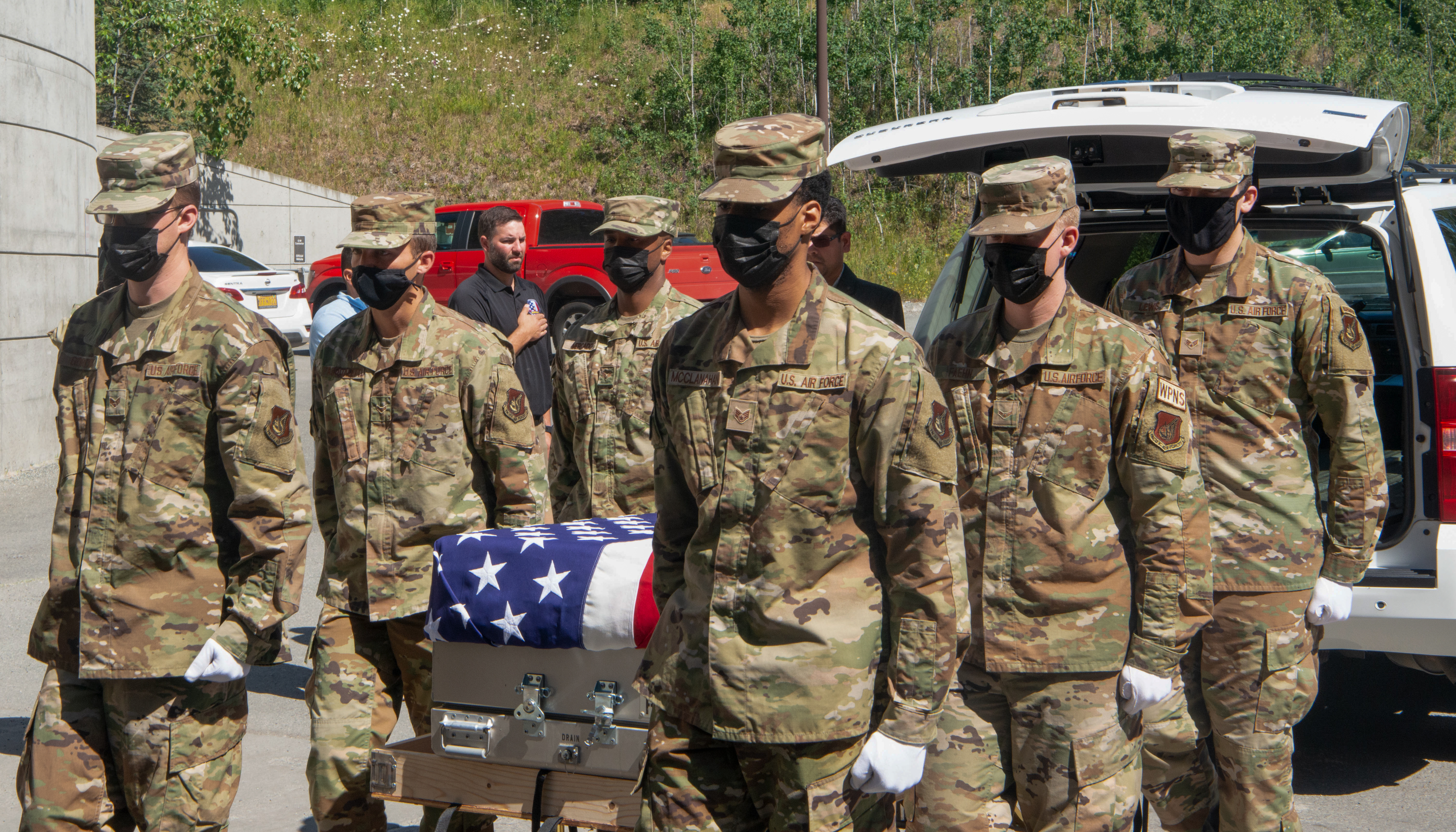
U.S. Air Force Honor Guard transfers remains of recovered service members at Joint Base Elmendorf-Richardson, Alaska, June 2021

After the discovery of the crash wreckage, Operation Colony Glacier was established for the recovery of remains and personal effects.

The initial recovery operation taken over by the Joint POW/MIA Accounting Command, whose primary role is to search for US military personnel missing overseas. On June 18, 2014, after two seasons of operations on the glacier, the Department of Defense announced that the remains of 17 of the victims had been identified and would be returned to their families for burial. By 2019, the Department of Defense had increased the number of sets of remains identified to 40. At the conclusion of the 2022 effort, ten years after recovery efforts began, remains of 41 service members had been retrieved and identified.

This operation has continued on an annual basis, led by Alaskan Command. The annual effort occurs during a small time window each summer.

After the 10th anniversary of the discovery, in 2022, remains of 41 persons had been recovered and identified. As of June 2025, that number is 49.

On January 7, 2026, the U.S. Department of War announced that all 52 service members' remains had been identified.

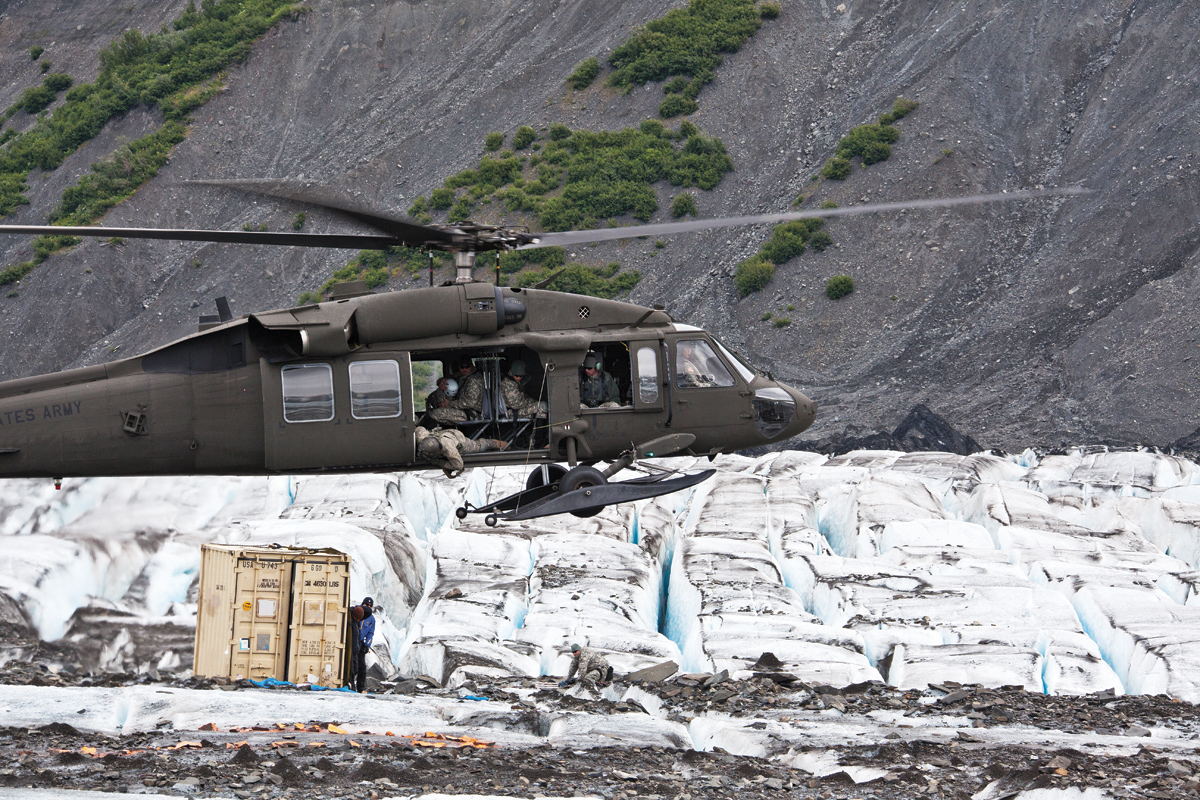
2012: UH-60 transports crash recovery team to Colony Glacier after a sighting of possible wreckage

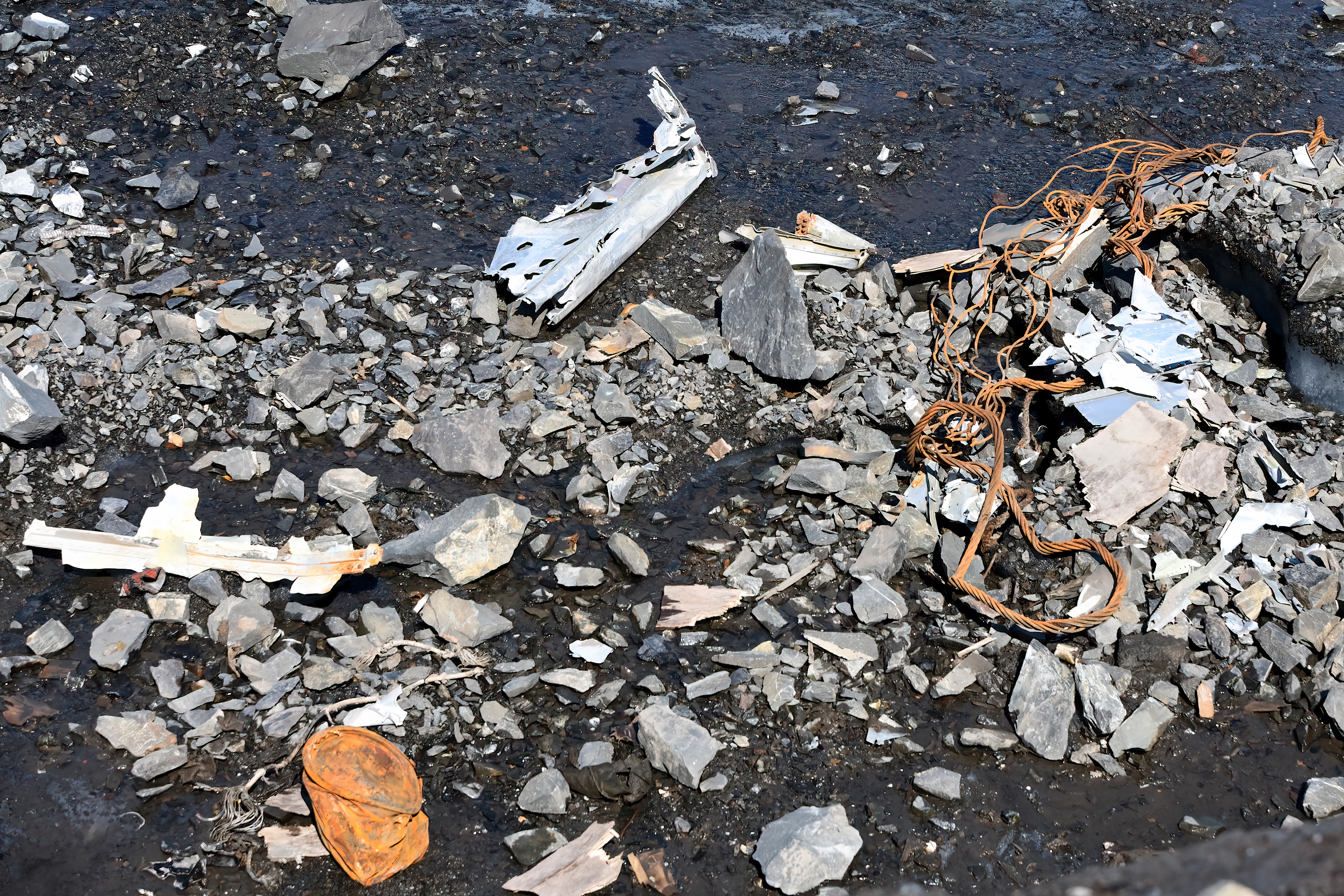
2022: Part of the debris field left on Colony Glacier

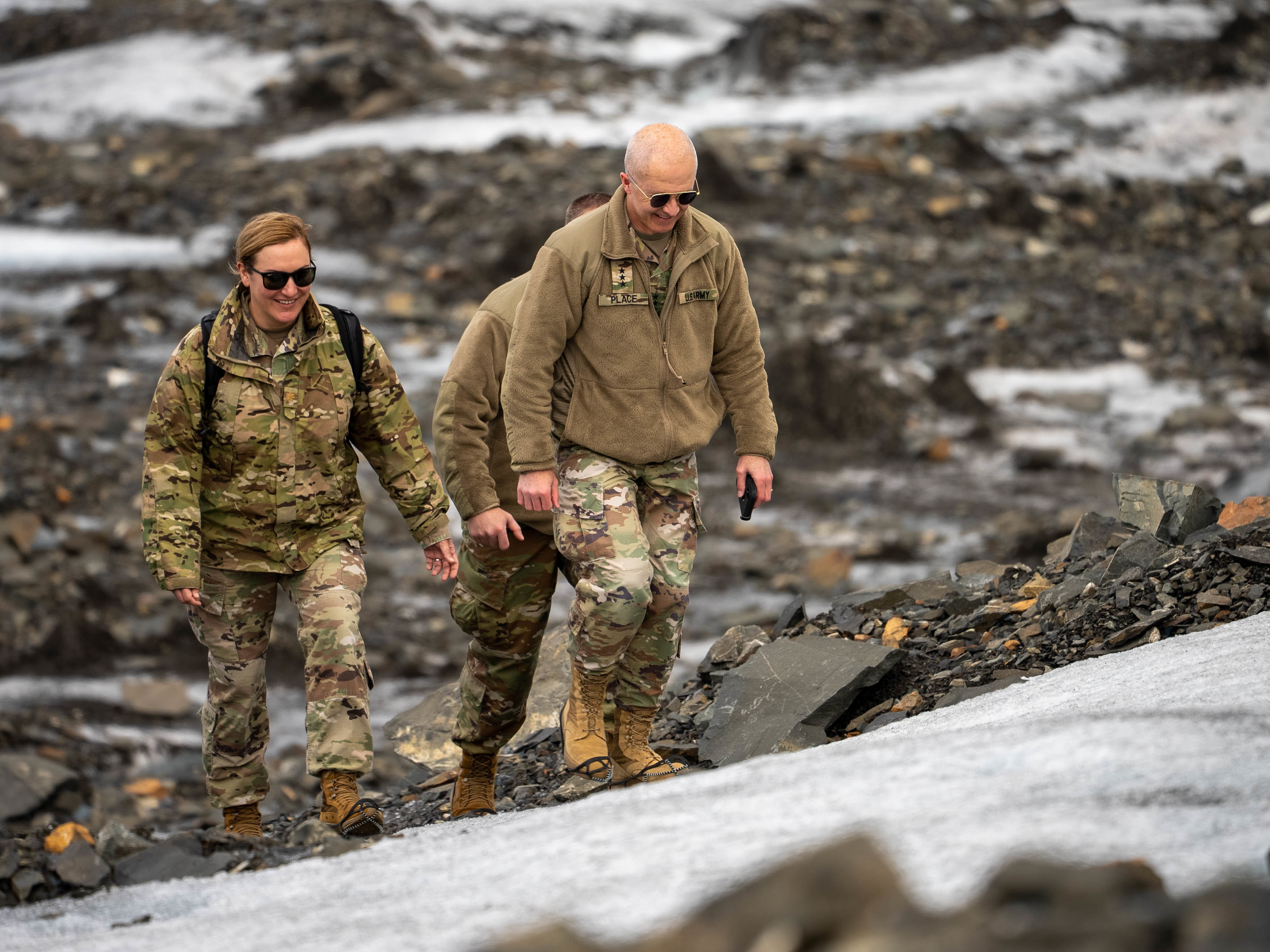
2022: LtGen Ronald Place hikes on Colony Glacier

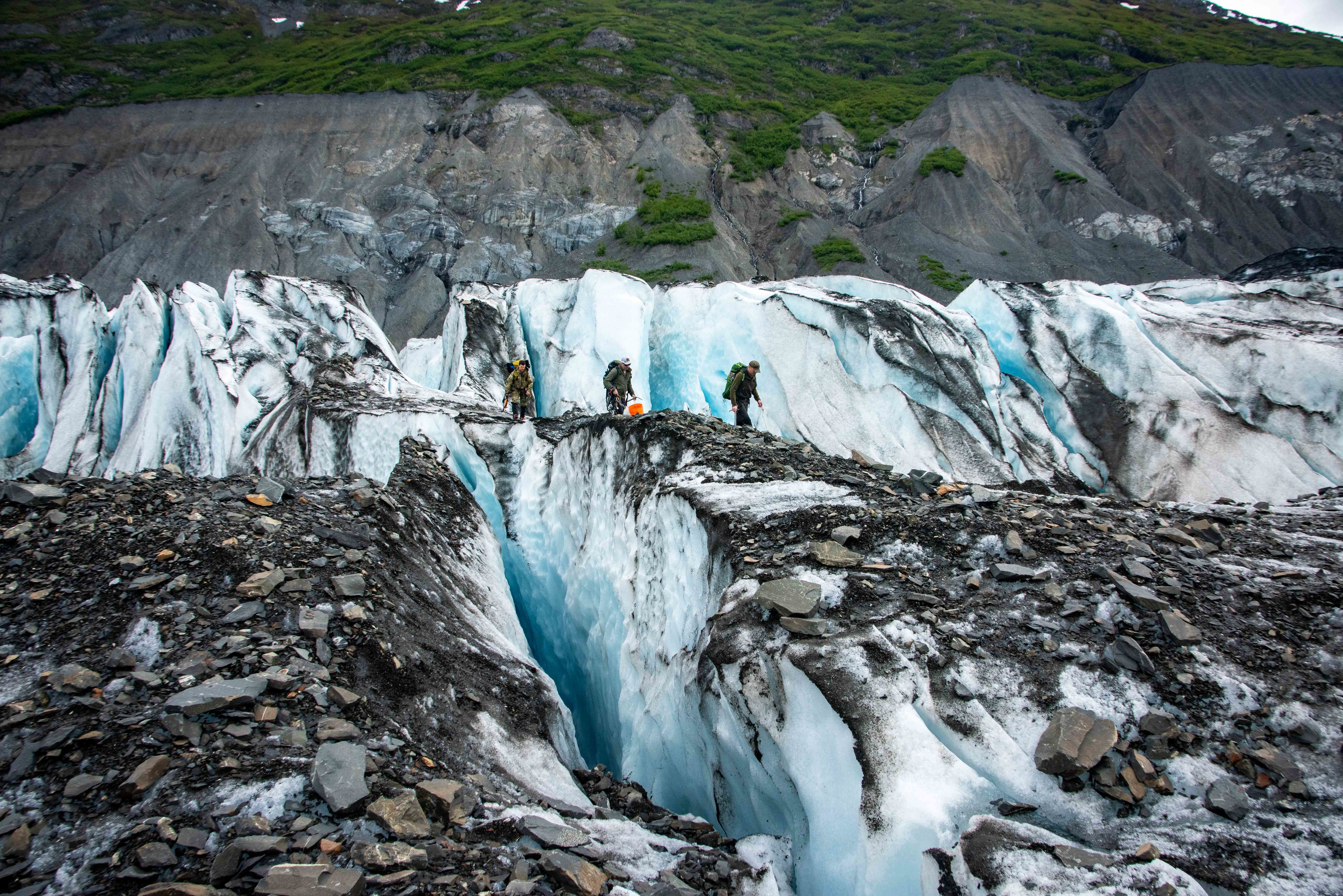
2023: Recovery team members cross glacier ridge

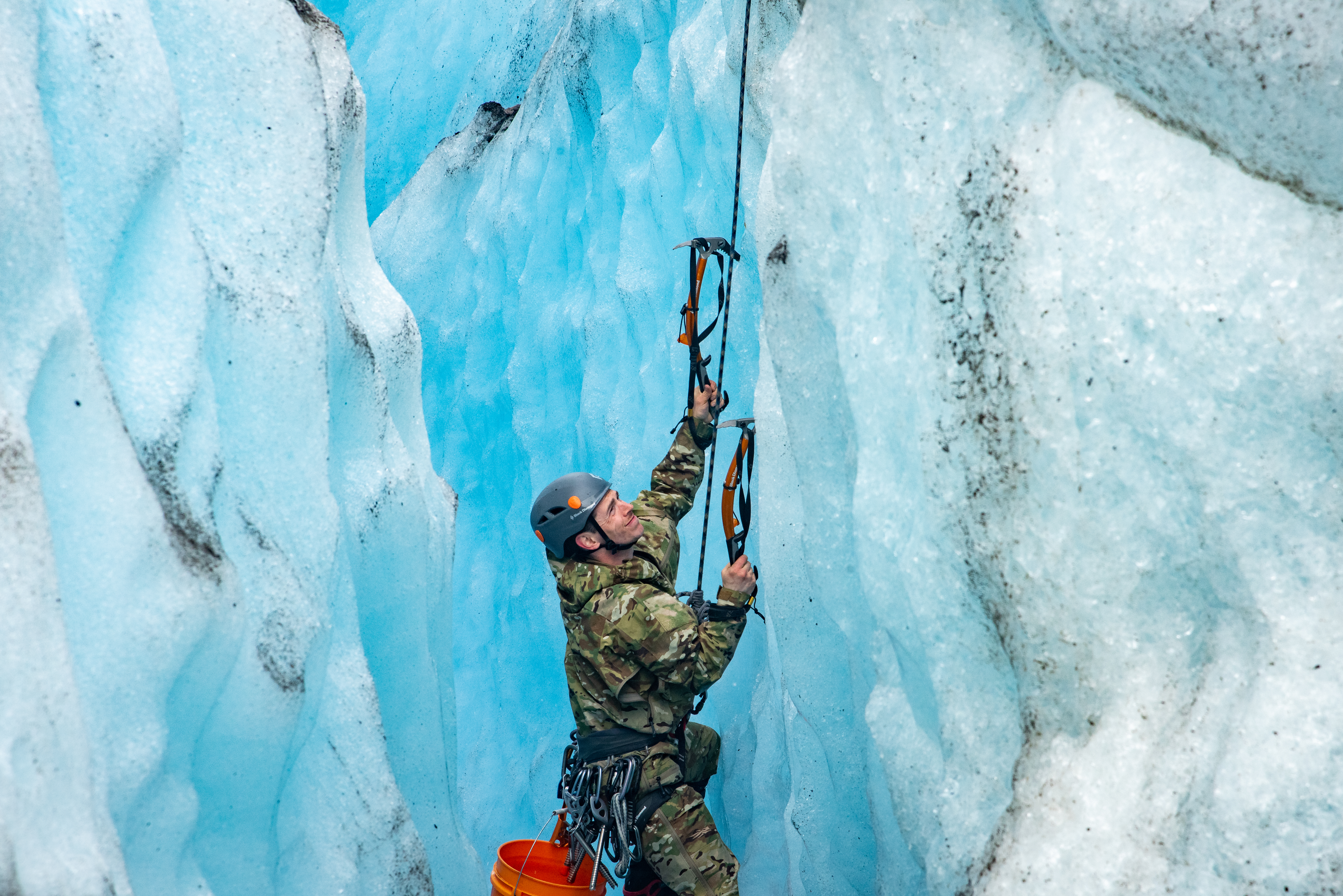
2023: Scaling crevasses wall after recovering remains

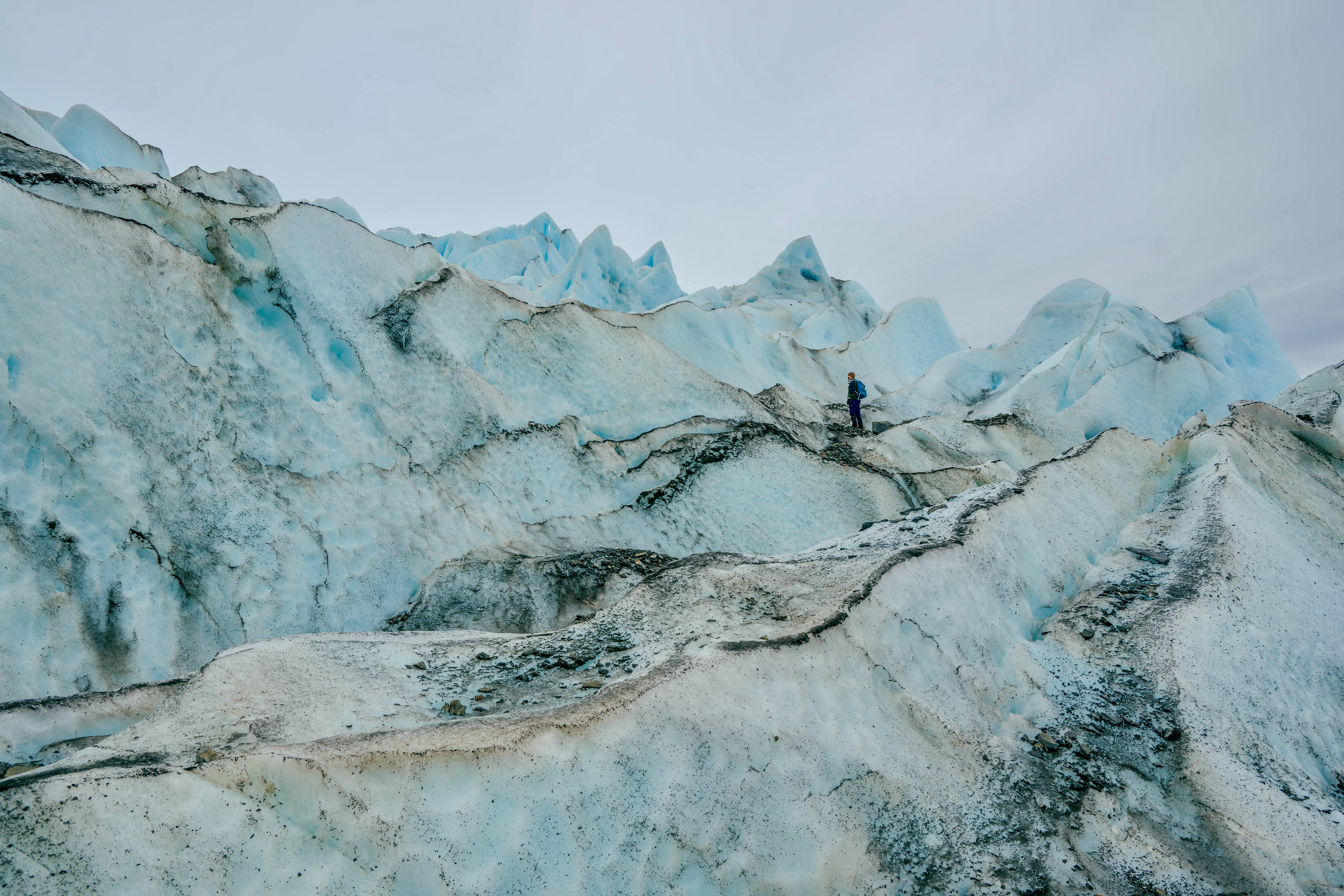
2025: Searching for remains on Colony Glacier

== See also ==
- 1952 Moses Lake C-124 crash, another C-124 crash less than a month later that killed 87 men and was at that time the deadliest-ever aviation accident.
- Tachikawa air disaster, a June 1953 air accident also involving a C-124.
