= 1952 Moses Lake C-124 crash =

Fatal USAF passenger airplane crash in Washington state

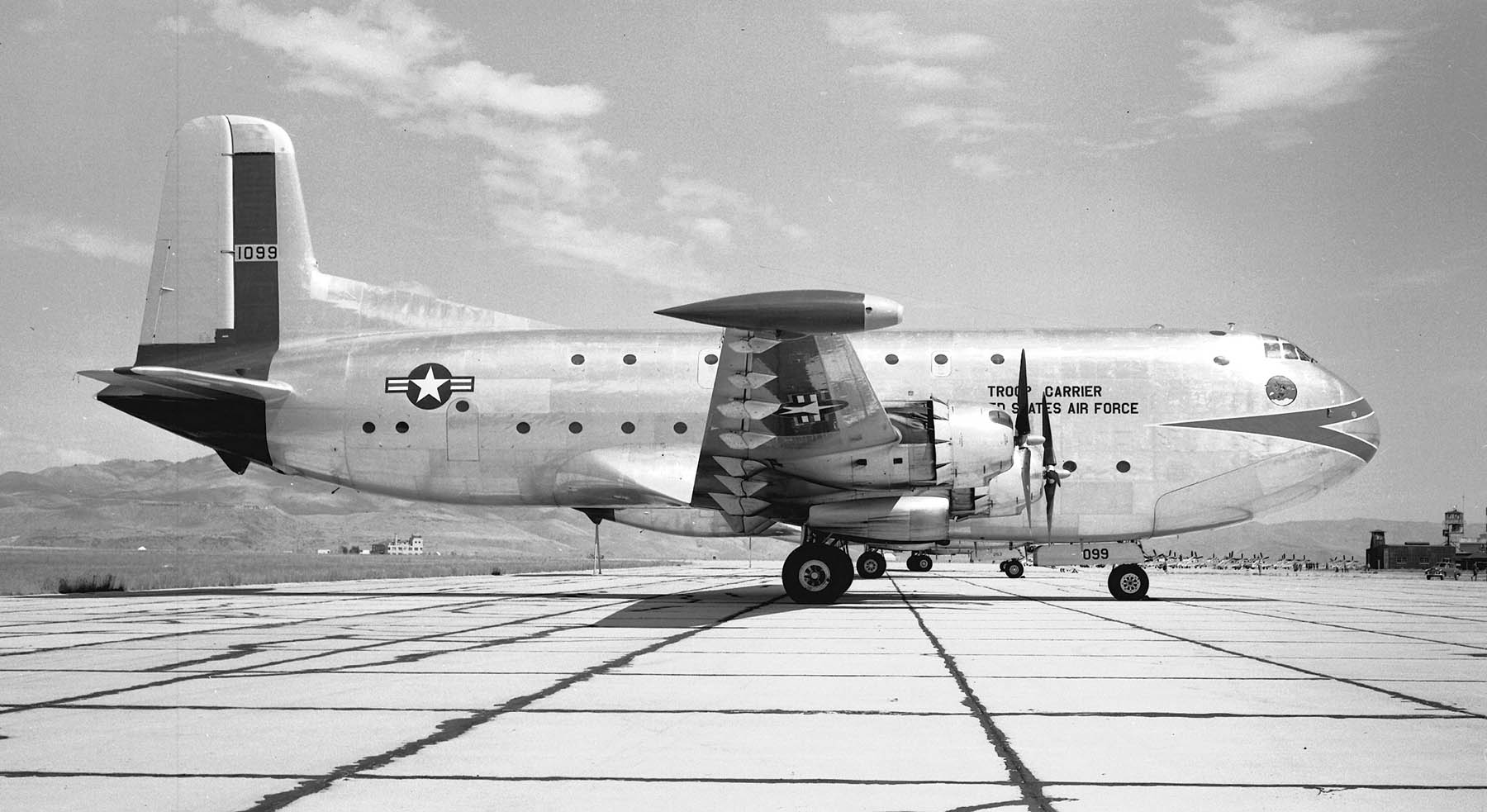
- A C-124A similar to the accident aircraft

Accident
- Date: December 20, 1952
- Summary: Loss of control due to inadvertent gust lock engagement
- Site: Near Larson Air Force Base, Moses Lake, Grant County, Washington, United States; 47°12′24.41″N 119°19′25.47″W

Aircraft
- Aircraft type: Douglas C-124A-DL Globemaster II
- Operator: United States Air Force
- Registration: 50-0100
- Flight origin: Larson Air Force Base, Moses Lake, Washington
- Destination: Kelly Air Force Base, San Antonio, Texas
- Occupants: 115
- Passengers: 105
- Crew: 10
- Fatalities: 87
- Survivors: 28

The 1952 Moses Lake C-124 crash was an accident in which a United States Air Force Douglas C-124 Globemaster II military transport aircraft crashed near Moses Lake, Washington on December 20, 1952. Of the 115 people on board, 87 died and 28 survived. The crash was the world's deadliest aviation disaster at the time, surpassing the Llandow air disaster, which killed 80 people. The death toll would not be surpassed until the Tachikawa air disaster, which also involved a Douglas C-124A-DL Globemaster II, killed 129 people. The crash remains the deadliest in Washington state history.

== Accident ==
The flight was part of "Operation: Sleigh Ride", a USAF airlift program to bring U.S. servicemen fighting in the Korean War home for Christmas. At around 18:30 PST, the C-124 lifted off from Larson Air Force Base near Moses Lake, Washington en route to Kelly Air Force Base, San Antonio, Texas. Just seconds after taking off, the left wing struck the ground and the aircraft cartwheeled, broke up, and exploded, killing 82 of the 105 passengers and 5 of the 10 crew members. Investigation into the accident revealed that the aircraft's elevator and rudder gust locks had not been disengaged prior to departure.

At the time it occurred, the Moses Lake crash was the deadliest accident in U.S. territory until a United Airlines DC-7 and a TWA L-1049 Super Constellation collided over the Grand Canyon in 1956, killing 128. The crash also remains the deadliest aviation accident to occur in Washington state.

== See also ==
- Tachikawa air disaster, the next and worst air accident involving a C-124, which happened just six months after the Moses Lake crash.
- Arrow Air Flight 1285, another aircraft bringing U.S. servicemen home for Christmas which crashed in 1985.
