= Douglas C-124 Globemaster II =

American heavy lift military aircraft with 4 piston engines, 1946

C-124 Globemaster II
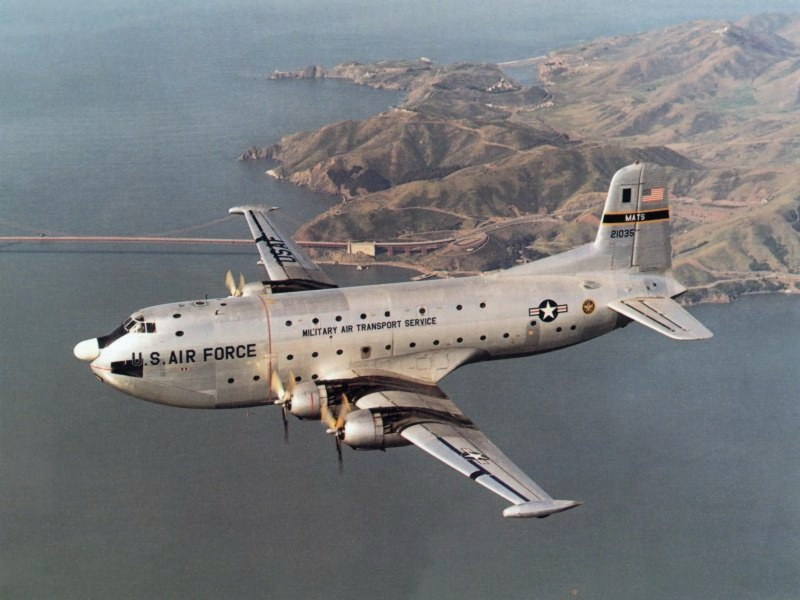
- C-124C, operated by the USAF, flying above the San Francisco Bay, with the Golden Gate Bridge and the Marin Headlands in the background

General information
- Type: Heavy-lift military transport aircraft
- National origin: United States
- Manufacturer: Douglas Aircraft Company
- Primary user: United States Air Force
- Number built: 448

History
- Manufactured: 1949–1955
- Introduction date: 1950
- First flight: 27 November 1949
- Retired: 1974 (USAF)
- Developed from: Douglas C-74 Globemaster
- Developed into: Douglas C-132 (Unbuilt)

The Douglas C-124 Globemaster II, nicknamed "Old Shaky", is a retired American heavy-lift cargo aircraft built by the Douglas Aircraft Company in Long Beach, California.

The C-124 was the primary heavy-lift transport for United States Air Force (USAF) Military Air Transport Service (MATS) during the 1950s and early 1960s, until the Lockheed C-141 Starlifter entered service. It served in MATS, later Military Airlift Command (MAC), and units of the Air Force Reserve and Air National Guard until retired in 1974.

== Design and development ==
Douglas Aircraft developed the C-124 from 1947 to 1949, from a prototype they created from a World War II–design Douglas C-74 Globemaster, and based on lessons learned during the Berlin Airlift. The aircraft was powered by four large Pratt & Whitney R-4360 Wasp Major piston engines producing 3,800 hp (2,800 kW) each. The C-124's design featured two, large, clamshell doors and a hydraulically actuated ramp in the nose, as well as a cargo elevator under the aft fuselage. The C-124 was capable of carrying 68,500 lb (31,100 kg) of cargo, and the 77 ft (23 m) cargo bay featured two overhead hoists, each capable of lifting 8,000 lb (3,600 kg). As a cargo hauler, it could carry tanks, guns, trucks, and other heavy equipment, while in its passenger-carrying role, it could carry 200 fully equipped troops on its double decks or 127 litter patients and their nurses. It was the only aircraft of its time capable of transporting fully assembled heavy equipment such as tanks and bulldozers.

The C-124 first flew on 27 November 1949, with the C-124A being delivered from May 1950. The C-124C was next, featuring more powerful engines, and an APS-42 weather radar fitted in a "thimble"-like structure on the nose. Wingtip-mounted combustion heaters were added to heat the cabin, and enable wing and tail surface deicing. The C-124As were later equipped with these improvements.

One C-124C, 52-1069, c/n 43978, was used as a JC-124C, for testing the 15,000 shp (11,000 kW) Pratt & Whitney XT57 (PT5) turboprop, which was installed in the nose.

== Operational history ==
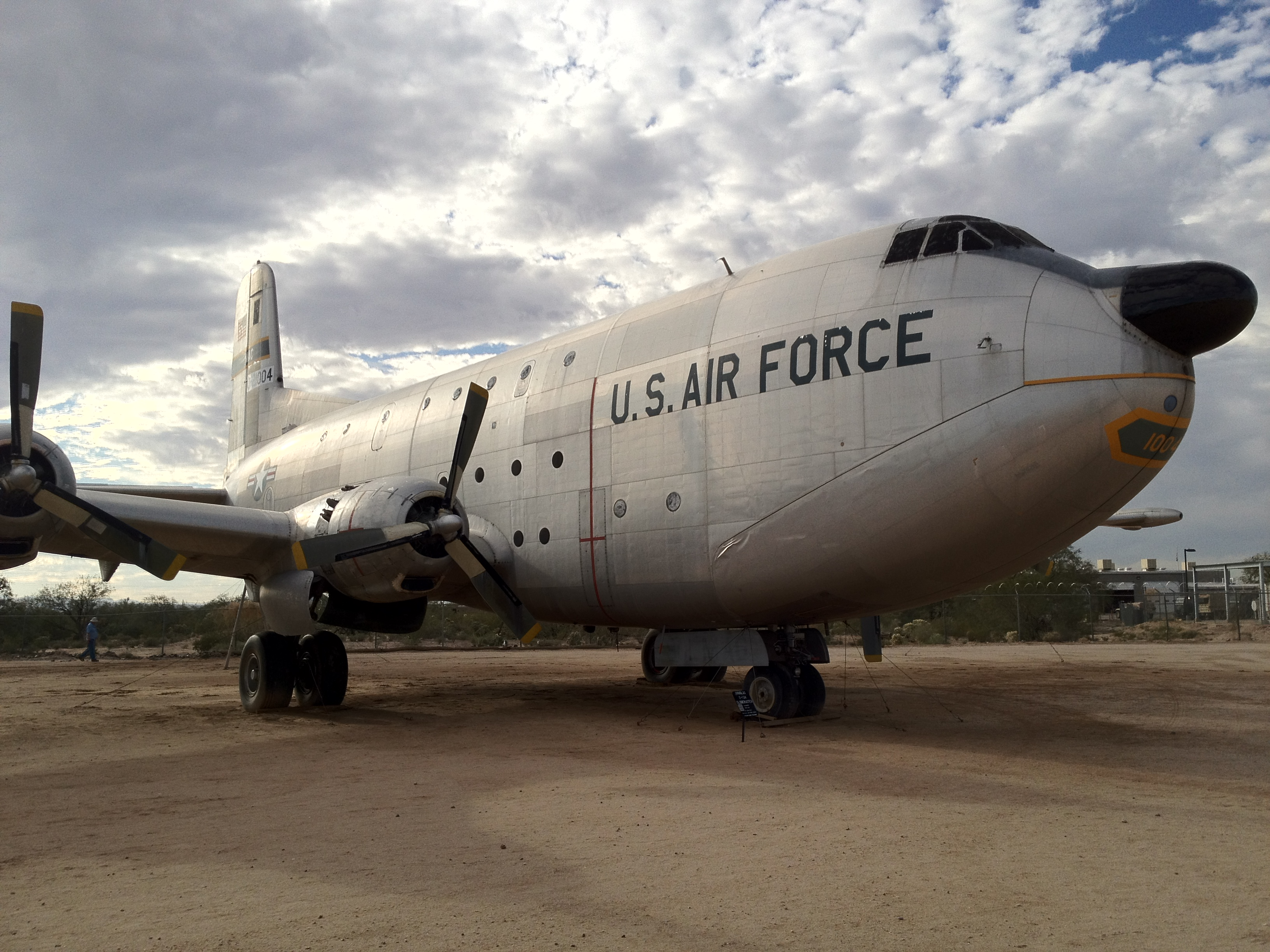
Nose and front door of a C-124

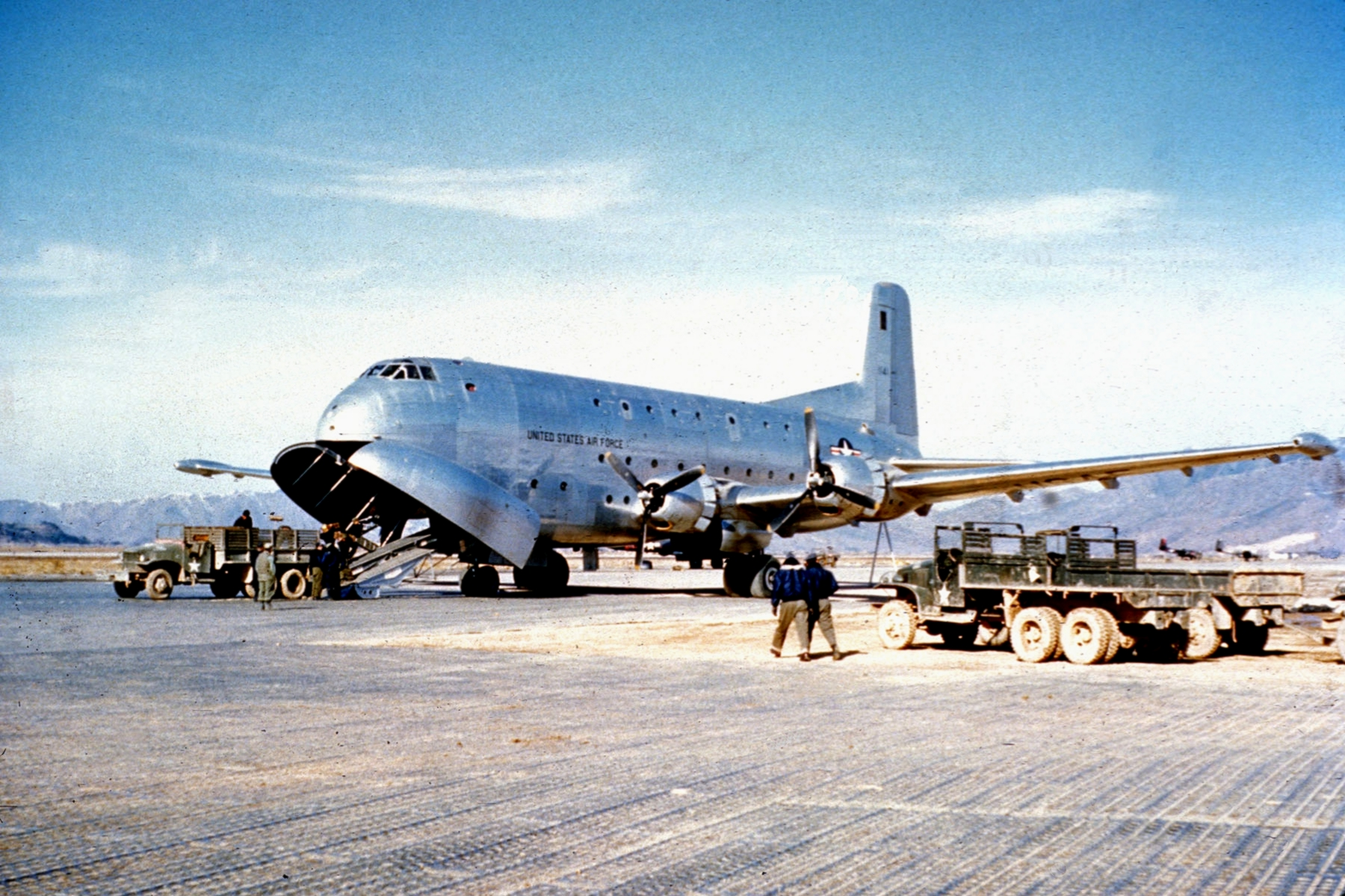
An early C-124A during the Korean War

First deliveries of the 448 production aircraft began in May 1950 and continued until 1955. The C-124 was operational during the Korean War, and was also used to assist supply operations for Operation Deep Freeze in Antarctica. They performed heavy-lift cargo operations for the U.S. military worldwide, including flights to Southeast Asia, Africa, and elsewhere. From 1959 to 1961, they transported Thor missiles across the Atlantic to England. The C-124 was also used extensively during the Vietnam War transporting materiel from the U.S. to Vietnam. Until the C-5A became operational, the C-124 and its sister C-133 Cargomaster were the only aircraft available that could transport very large loads.

The USAF's Strategic Air Command (SAC) was the initial operator of the C-124 Globemaster, with 50 in service from 1950 through 1962. Four squadrons operated the type, consisting of the 1st, 2nd, 3rd, and 4th Strategic Support Squadrons. Their primary duty was to transport nuclear weapons between air bases and to provide airlift of SAC personnel and equipment during exercises and overseas deployments.

The Military Air Transport Service (MATS) was the primary operator until January 1966, when the organization was retitled Military Airlift Command (MAC). Within a few years following the formation of MAC, the last remaining examples of the C-124 were transferred to the Air Force Reserve (AFRES) and the Air National Guard (ANG), said transfers being complete by 1970. The first ANG unit to receive the C-124C, the 165th Tactical Airlift Group (now known as the 165th Airlift Wing) of the Georgia Air National Guard, was the last Air Force unit to retire their aircraft (AF serial numbers 52-1066 and 53-0044) in September 1974.

== Variants ==
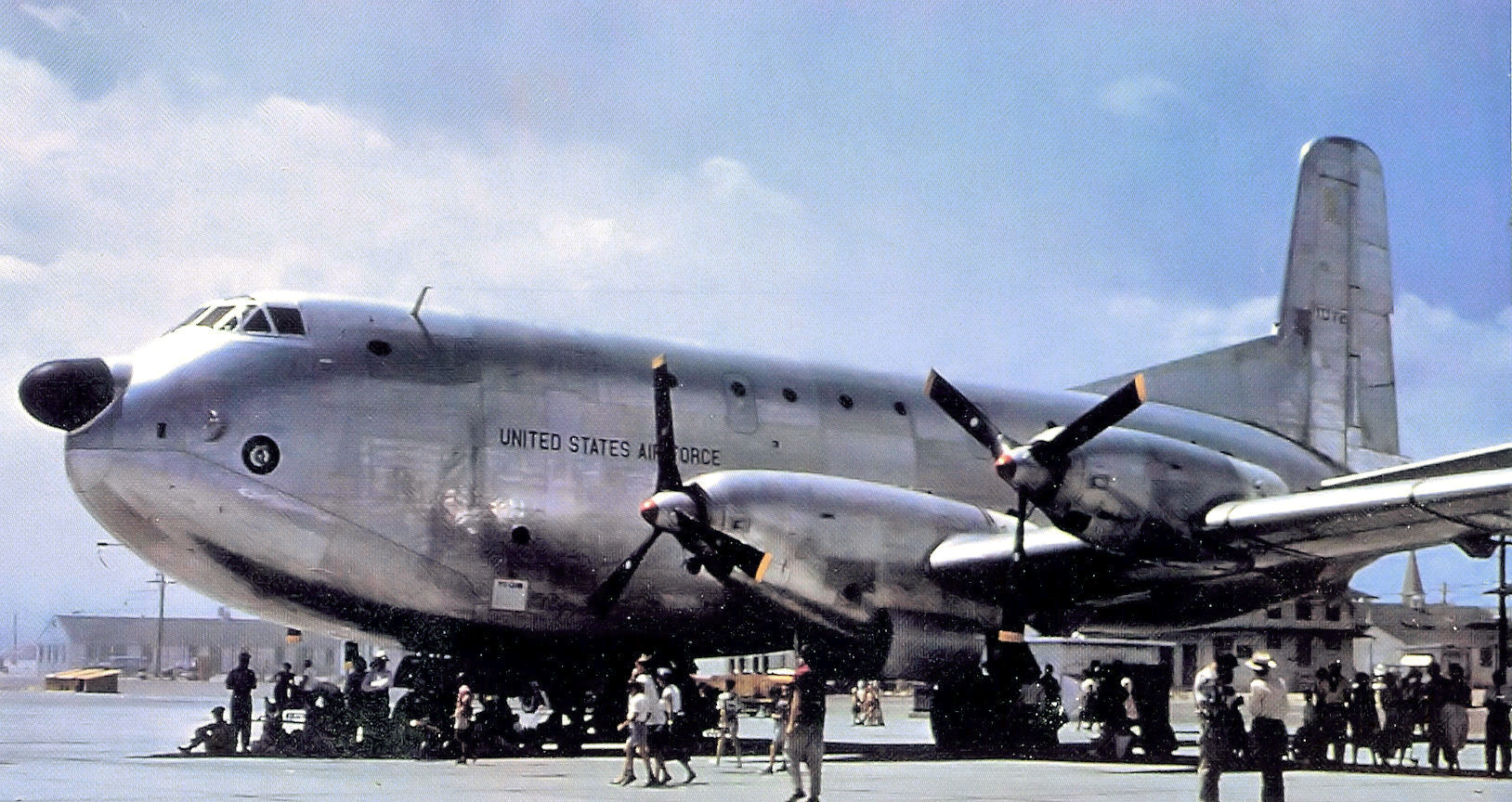
The experimental YC-124B-DL was powered by four Pratt & Whitney YT-34-P-6 turboprops.

YC-124
Prototype rebuilt from a C-74 with a new fuselage and powered by four 3,500 hp R-4360-39 engines, it was later re-engined and redesignated YC-124A.
YC-124A
Prototype YC-124 was re-engined with four 3,800 hp R-4360-35A engines.
C-124A
Douglas Model 1129A was a production version with four 3,500 hp R-4360-20WA engines; 204 were built, with most retrofitted later with nose radar and combustion heaters in wingtip fairings.
YC-124B
Douglas Model 1182E was a turboprop variant of the C-124A with four Pratt & Whitney YT34-P-6 turboprops; originally proposed as a tanker, it was used for trials on the operation of turboprop aircraft; it was originally designated as C-127.
C-124C
Douglas Model 1317 was the same as a C-124A, but with four 3,800 hp R-4360-63A engines, nose radar, wingtip combustion heaters, and increased fuel capacity; 243 were built.

== Operators ==
United States

- United States Air Force

Military Air Transport Service / Military Airlift Command

- 1501st Air Transport Wing / 60th Military Airlift Wing
- 1502nd Air Transport Wing / 61st Military Airlift Wing
- 1503rd Air Transport Wing / 65th Military Airlift Group
- 1607th Air Transport Wing / 436th Military Airlift Wing
- 1608th Air Transport Wing / 437th Military Airlift Wing

== Accidents and incidents ==
- 23 March 1951: A C-124A 49-0244 flying from Loring Air Force Base to RAF Mildenhall reported a fire in the cargo crates, signaling mayday. They began jettisoning the crates and announced they were ditching. The C-124 ditched around 50°45′0″N 24°03′0″W, 700 mi (1,100 km) southwest of Ireland. The aircraft was intact when it touched down on the ocean. All hands exited the aircraft wearing life preservers and climbed into the inflated five-man life rafts. The rafts were equipped with cold-weather gear, food, water, flares, and Gibson Girl hand-crank emergency radios. Shortly after the men were in the life rafts, a B-29 pilot out of England spotted the rafts and the flares that the men had ignited. Their location was reported and the pilot left the scene when his fuel was getting low. No other United States or Allied planes or ships made it to the ditch site for over 19 hours, until Sunday, 25 March 1951. When the ships arrived, all they found were some charred crates and a partially deflated life raft. Ships and planes continued searching for the next several days, but not a single body was found. Some circumstantial evidence indicates that the airmen may have been "snatched" by the Soviet Union for their intelligence value, but their fate remains a mystery. See 1951 Atlantic C-124 disappearance.
- 22 November 1952: C-124A 51-0107, flying out of McChord Air Force Base in Washington, crashed into the Colony Glacier on Mount Gannett, 40 mi (60 km) east of Anchorage, Alaska, killing all 41 passengers and 11 crew. Debris from the plane and remains of some of the victims were found by the Alaska National Guard on 10 June 2012, having apparently been uncovered due to the receding of the glacier. By 2014, remains of 17 victims had been recovered.
- 20 December 1952: C-124 50-0100 flying out of Moses Lake, Washington (Larson AFB), and taking airmen home to Texas for the holidays as part of "Operation Sleigh Ride", crashed not long after takeoff. In total, 87 airmen were killed.
- 18 June 1953: C-124 51-137 took off from Tachikawa Air Base in Japan. Shortly after takeoff, one of the engines failed, forcing the pilot to make an emergency landing. Due to a loss of airspeed, the pilot lost control and crashed into a melon patch, killing all seven crew and 122 passengers. At the time, it was the worst accident in aviation history.
- 6 April 1956: C-124 52-1078, crashed on takeoff from Travis AFB. Three of the seven crew members died in the crash. The cause of the crash was attributed to the crossing of the elevator control cables by maintenance personnel.
- 2 April 1957: C-124A 51-5176 crashed on final approach in Cambridge Bay, Nunavut (at the time, in the Northwest Territories), while ferrying supplies for the construction of the DEW Line station. No fatalities occurred, but the aircraft was damaged beyond repair.
- 31 August 1957: C-124C 52-1021, operated by the 1st Strategic Squadron (Note: Associated Press article does not give full squadron name, but it is likely that this refers to the 1st Strategic Support Squadron, as this unit operated the C-124 and was based at Biggs AFB.), crashed during an instrument approach to Biggs Air Force Base in El Paso, Texas, in bad weather after a flight from Hunter AFB near Savannah, Georgia. Five aircrew were killed, and 10 were injured.
- 4 September 1957, C-124A 51-5173 en route from Larson AFB, Washington, crashed while attempting a landing at Binghamton Airport, Binghamton, New York. The C-124A was delivering 20 tons of equipment for Link Aviation. The crew of nine survived.
- 27 March 1958: C-124C 52-0981 collided in midair with a USAF Fairchild C-119C Flying Boxcar, 49-0195, over farmland near Bridgeport, Texas, killing all 15 on the Globemaster and all three on the Flying Boxcar. The two transports crossed paths over a VHF omnidirectional range (VOR) navigational radio beacon during cruise flight under instrument flight rules in low visibility. The C-124 was on a north-north-easterly heading flying at its properly assigned altitude of 7,000 ft (2,100 m); the C-119 was on a southeasterly heading, and the crew had been instructed to fly at 6,000 ft (1,800 m), but their aircraft was not flying at this altitude when the collision occurred.
- 16 October 1958: C-124C 52-1017 crashed into a 3,200 ft (980 m) mountain near Cape Hallett Bay, killing seven of the 13 on board. Navigational errors were made during this air-drop mission over Antarctica.
- 18 April 1960: C-124C 52-1062 crashed into a 450 ft (140 m) hillside after taking off in heavy fog from Stephenville-Harmon Air Force Base, Newfoundland and Labrador, Canada, killing all nine on board.
- 24 May 1961: C-124 51-0174 crashed following takeoff from McChord Air Force Base. Eighteen of the 22 passengers and crew were killed. M/Sgt Llewellyn Morris Chilson, the second-highest decorated soldier of World War II, was one of the four survivors.
- 2 January 1964: C-124C 52–0968 of the 24th Air Transport Squadron flying from Wake Island Airfield to Hickam Air Force Base, Honolulu, was on a flight from Tachikawa Air Force Base near Tokyo, Japan, with 11 tons of cargo; the plane disappeared over the ocean, 1,200 km west of Hawaii. The Globemaster II is last heard from at 0159 hrs. An automatic SOS signal was detected emanating from an aircraft-type radio with a constant carrier frequency of 4728 kHz, issuing an automatically keyed distress message. Eight crew and one passenger were lost in the accident.
- 22 January 1965: C-124 52-1058 crashed into mountains while on approach to Athens Airport. All 10 passengers and crew were killed.
- 12 February 1966: C-124 52-0980 crashed into the 11,423 ft (3,482 m) Pico Mulhacén in the Sierra Nevada while on a flight from Morón Air Base to Murcia–San Javier Airport, Spain. All eight aboard were killed.
- 28 July 1968: C-124A 51-5178, flying from Paramaribo-Zanderij to Recife, while on approach to land at Recife, flew into a 1,890-ft-high hill, 50 miles (80 km) away from Recife. All 10 occupants died.
- 26 August 1970: C-124 52-1049 crashed on approach to Cold Bay Airport in the Aleutian Islands. All seven on board were killed.
- 3 May 1972: C-124 52-1055 crashed on approach to Johan Adolf Pengel International Airport; all 11 on board were killed.

== Surviving aircraft ==
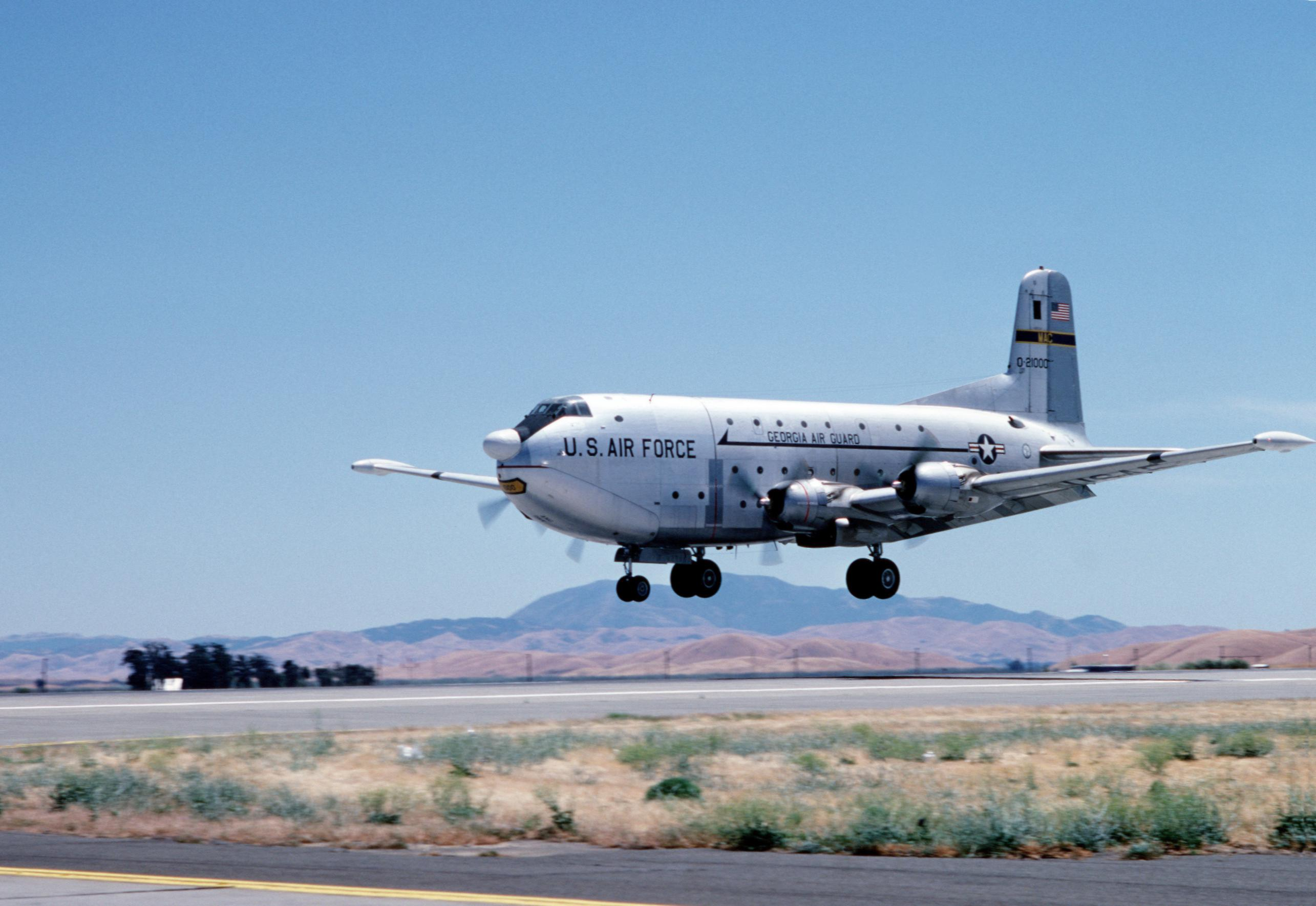
C-124C 52–1000 made its last landing at Travis Air Force Base, 10 June 1984.

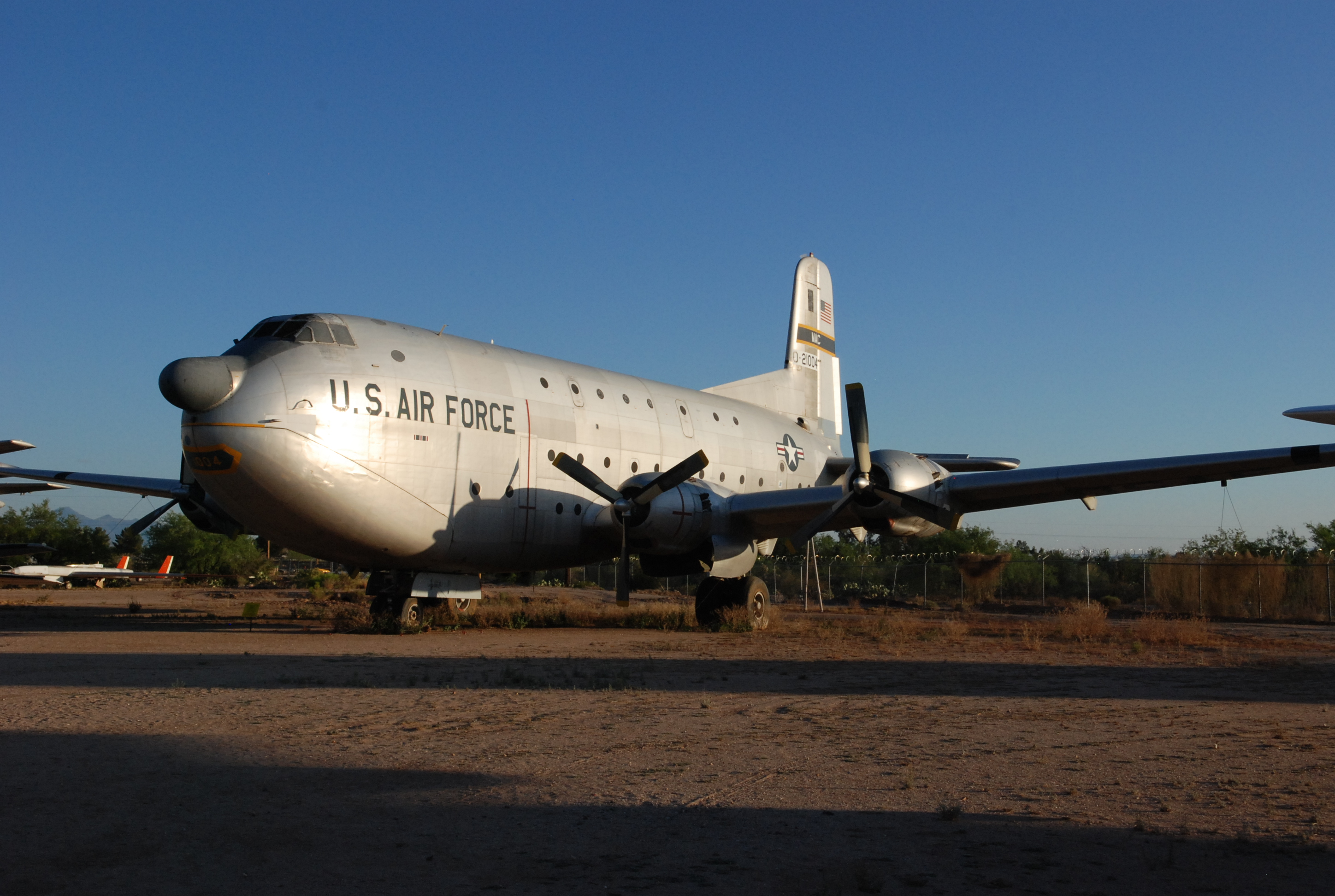
C-124 at Pima

South Korea

- 52-0943 – C-124C is on static display at the KAI Aerospace Museum in Sacheon, Yeongnam.

United States

- 49-0258 – C-124A is on static display at the Air Mobility Command Museum at Dover Air Force Base near Dover, Delaware. In July 2005, museum volunteers reattached the aircraft's wings and clamshell doors. It had previously been displayed at the Strategic Air Command Museum at Offutt Air Force Base, Nebraska, since 1969.
- 51-0089 – C-124C is on static display at the Museum of Aviation at Robins Air Force Base in Warner Robins, Georgia.
- 52-0994 – C-124C is on static display at the McChord Air Museum at McChord Field in Lakewood, Washington. This aircraft was formerly under civilian registration N86599 and located for many years at the Detroit Institute of Aeronautics. On 9 October 1986, the aircraft was flown nonstop from Selfridge Air National Guard Base near Detroit to McChord Field. While flying over Washington, the aircraft was joined by a Lockheed C-130 Hercules and Lockheed C-141 Starlifter of McChord's 62nd Military Airlift Wing. This is the last recorded flight of a C-124.
- 52-1000 – C-124C is on static display at the Travis Air Force Base Heritage Center at Travis Air Force Base in Fairfield, California.
- 52-1004 – C-124C is on static display at the Pima Air and Space Museum in Tucson, Arizona.
- 52-1066 – C-124C is on static display at the National Museum of the United States Air Force at Wright-Patterson Air Force Base in Dayton, Ohio. This was one of the last two ANG C-124s retired in 1974. The aircraft is displayed with serial number 51-0135.
- 53-0050 – C-124C is on static display at the Hill Aerospace Museum at Hill Air Force Base in Roy, Utah. In 1992, the aircraft was rescued from the Aberdeen Proving Ground in Maryland, which planned to use it for ballistics testing.

== Specifications (C-124C Globemaster II) ==
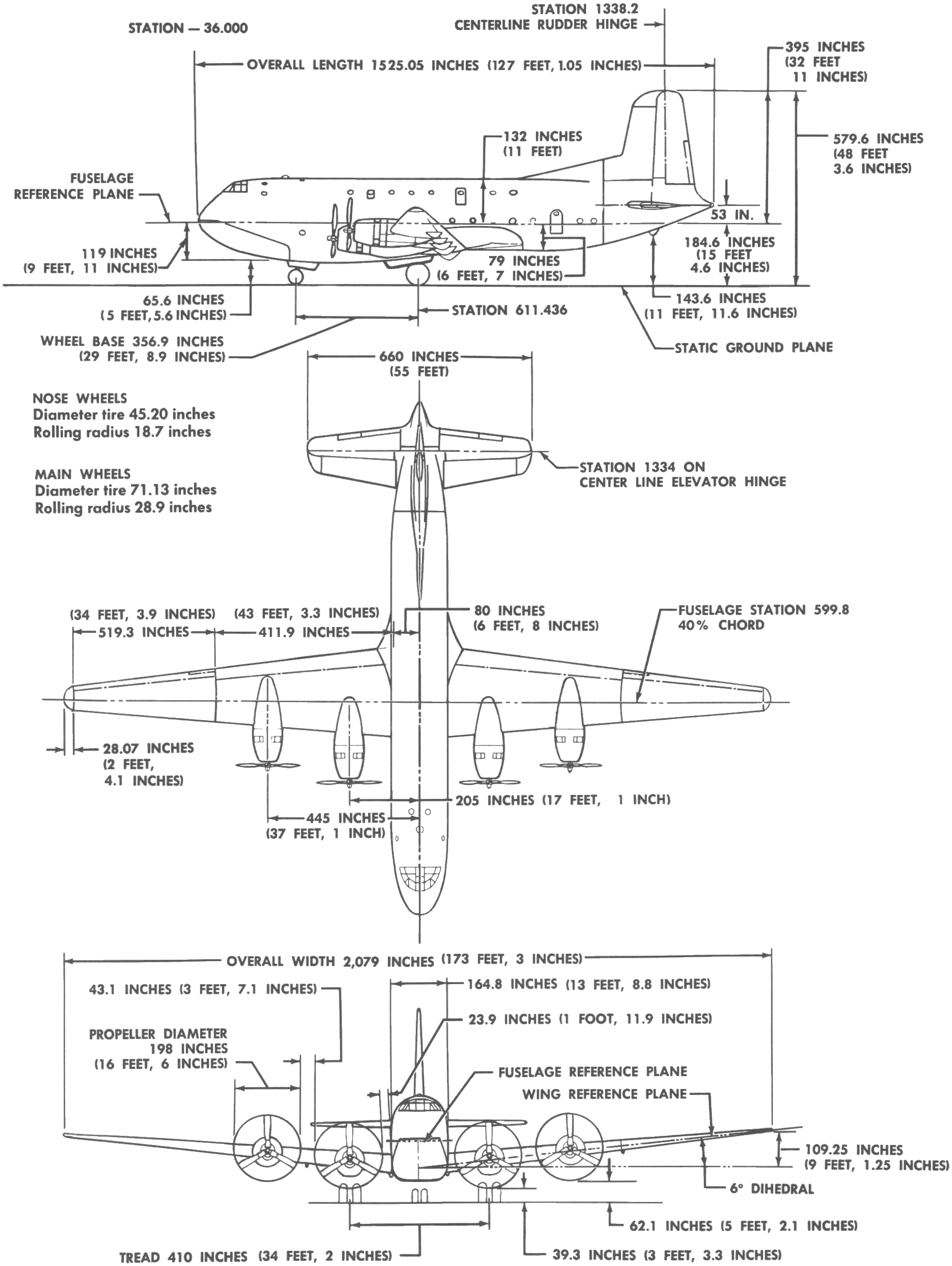
3-view line drawing of the early Douglas C-124A Globemaster II

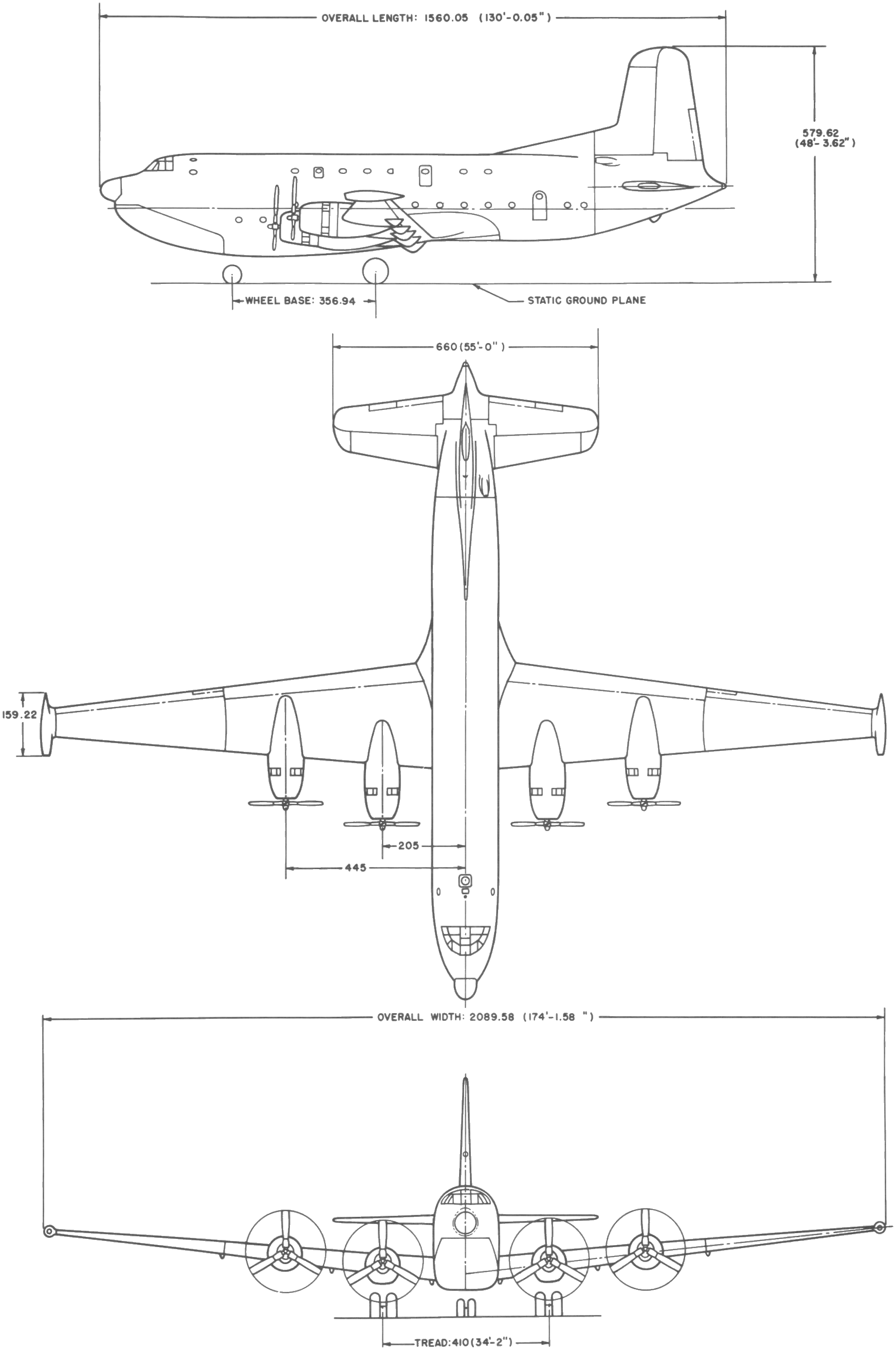
3-view line drawing of the Douglas C-124C Globemaster II

Data from McDonnell Douglas aircraft since 1920 : Volume I, McDonnell Douglas Aircraft since 1920

General characteristics

- Crew: 6 or 7: Aircraft Commander, Pilot, Navigator, Flight Engineer, Radio Operator, 2 Loadmasters
- Capacity: 200 troops / 123 litter patients with 45 ambulatory patients and 15 medical staff. Maximum payload 74,000 lb (34,000 kg)
- Length: 130 ft 5 in (39.75 m)
- Wingspan: 174 ft 1.5 in (53.073 m)
- Height: 48 ft 3.5 in (14.719 m)
- Wing area: 2,506 sq ft (232.8 m^{2})
- Empty weight: 101,165 lb (45,888 kg)
- Gross weight: 185,000 lb (83,915 kg)
- Max takeoff weight: 194,500 lb (88,224 kg)
- Fuel capacity: 11,128 US gal (42,120 L; 9,266 imp gal) ; 2x 30 US gal (110 L; 25 imp gal) water/alcohol tanks
- Powerplant: 4 × Pratt & Whitney R-4360-63A Wasp Major 28-cylinder air-cooled radial piston engines, 3,800 hp (2,800 kW) each with water/alcohol injection
- Propellers: 3-bladed Curtiss Model C634S-C402, 16 ft 6 in (5.03 m) diameter fully-feathering reversible-pitch constant-speed propeller

Performance

- Maximum speed: 304 mph (489 km/h, 264 kn) at 20,800 ft (6,300 m)
- Cruise speed: 230 mph (370 km/h, 200 kn)
- Range: 4,030 mi (6,490 km, 3,500 nmi) with 4,030 lb (1,830 kg) payload
- Ferry range: 6,820 mi (10,980 km, 5,930 nmi)
- Service ceiling: 21,800 ft (6,600 m)
- Rate of climb: 760 ft/min (3.9 m/s)
- Wing loading: 73.8 lb/sq ft (360 kg/m^{2})
- Power/mass: 0.041 hp/lb (0.067 kW/kg)
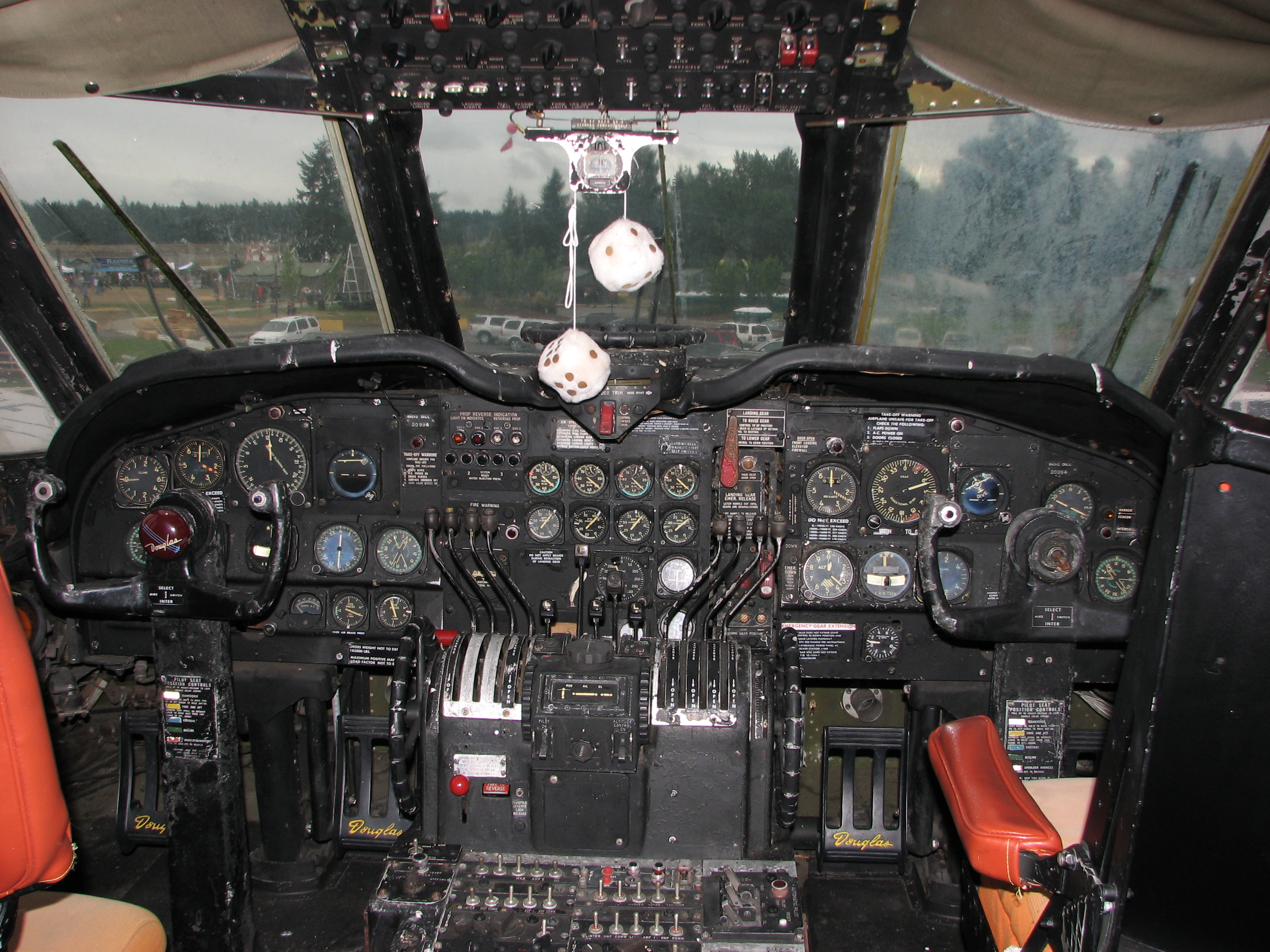
Cockpit of C-124 on display at the McChord Air Museum, McChord AFB, WA.

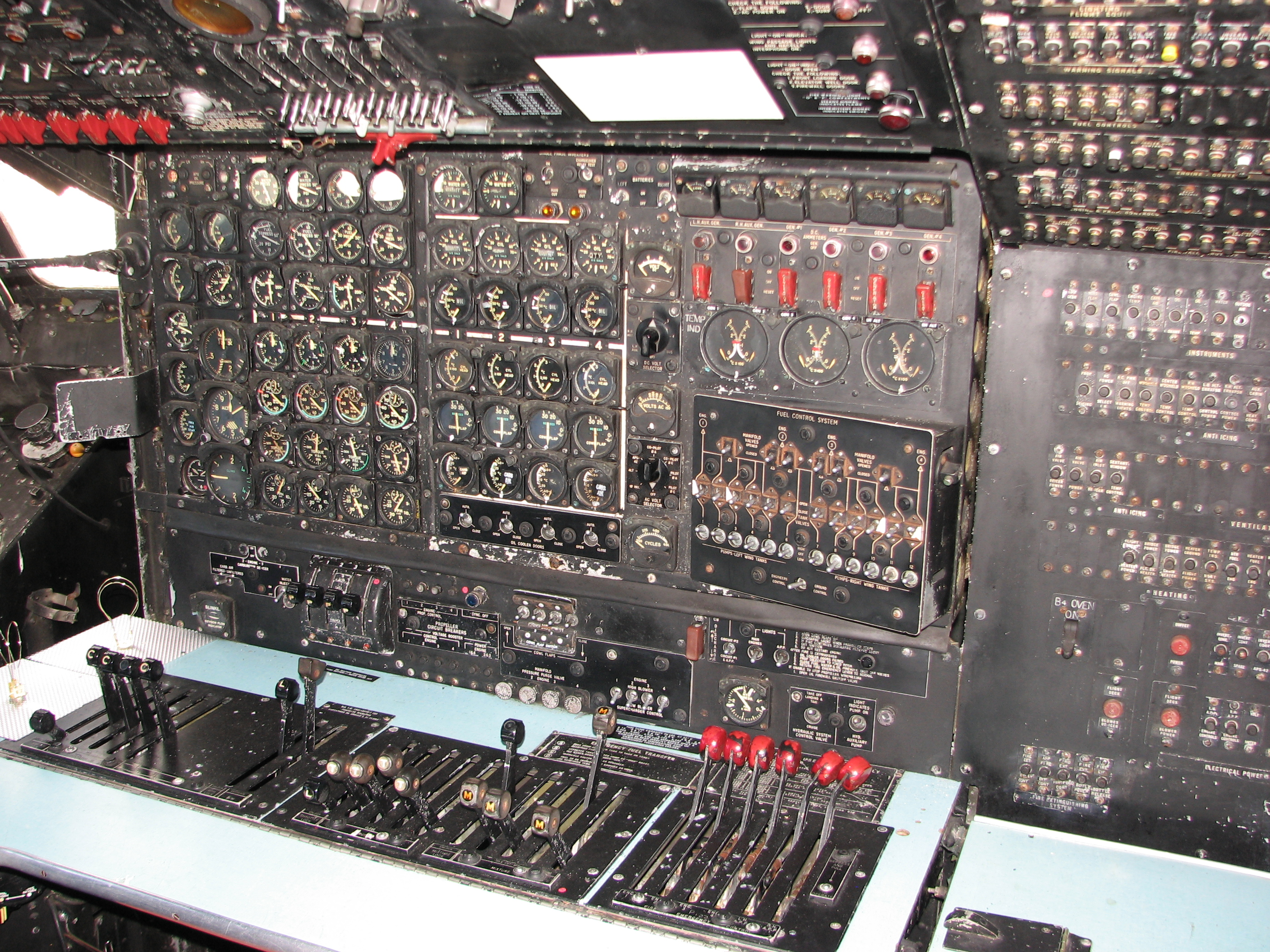
Flight engineer's station of a C-124.

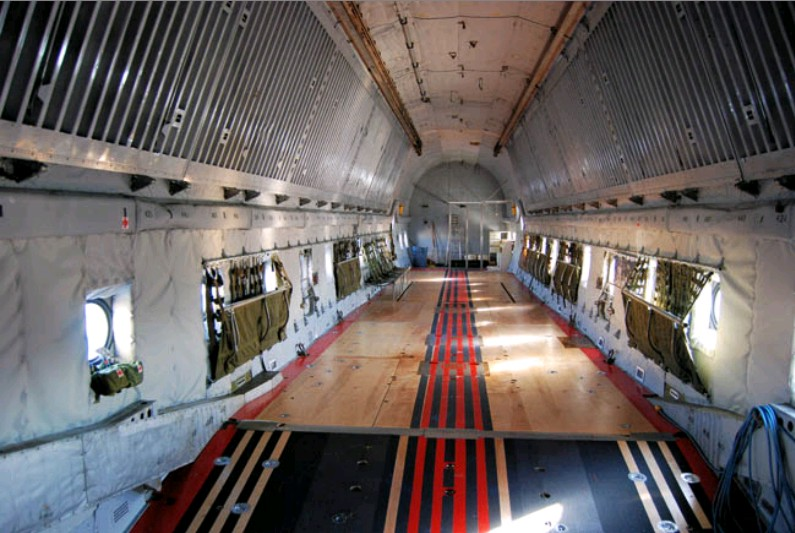
C-124A cargo deck.

== See also ==
Related development

- Douglas C-74 Globemaster – US military transport aircraft with 4 piston engines, 1945
- Douglas C-132 – Proposed American military transport aircraft

Aircraft of comparable role, configuration, and era

- Boeing C-97 Stratofreighter – Long-range heavy military cargo aircraft built 1944–1952
- Saunders-Roe Princess – British 1952 airliner flying boat
- Boeing 377 Stratocruiser – US airliner with 4 piston engines, 1947

Related lists

- Lists of military aircraft of the United States
- List of military transport aircraft
