= Tachikawa air disaster =

1953 U.S. Air Force plane crash in Japan

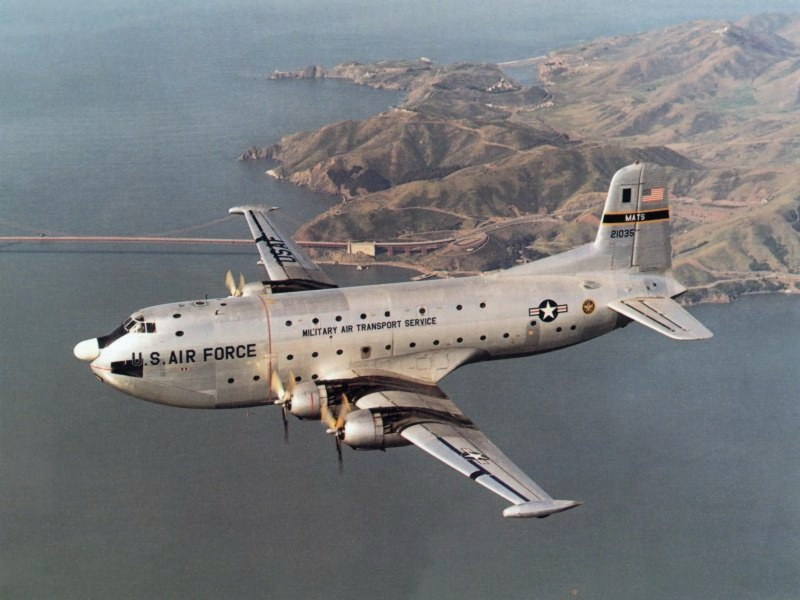
- A Douglas C-124 Globemaster II, the model of aircraft which crashed

Accident
- Date: June 18, 1953
- Summary: Engine failure; pilot error; loss of control
- Site: Kodaira, Tokyo, Japan; 35°43′57″N 139°27′27″E

Aircraft
- Aircraft type: Douglas C-124A-DL Globemaster II
- Operator: United States Air Force
- Registration: 51-0137
- Flight origin: Tachikawa Air Base, Tachikawa, Japan
- Destination: Kimpo International Airport, Seoul, South Korea
- Occupants: 129
- Passengers: 122
- Crew: 7
- Fatalities: 129
- Survivors: 0

Ground casualties
- Ground injuries: 1

On June 18, 1953, a United States Air Force (USAF) Douglas C-124 Globemaster II aircraft crashed three minutes after takeoff from Tachikawa, Japan, killing all 129 people on board. At the time, the crash was the deadliest in aviation history.

== Aircraft and occupants ==
The aircraft was a USAF Douglas C-124A-DL Globemaster II of the 374th Troop Carrier Group, serial number 51-0137. It was powered by four Pratt & Whitney R-4360-20WA engines.

The aircraft carried 122 passengers and 7 crewmembers. Most of those aboard were airmen who were returning to their duties in South Korea after a five-day rest and recreation leave in Japan. The commander of the aircraft, Major Herbert G. Voruz Jr., 37, had logged more than 6,000 flying hours. The pilot, Major Robert D. McCorkle, was also an experienced aviator. Another pilot, Major Paul E. Kennedy, was on board to log additional flying time.

== Accident ==
The aircraft departed Tachikawa Air Base for Seoul at 16:31 JST. Just one minute into the flight, the aircraft's No. 1 (outer left) engine burst into flames. Voruz immediately shut down the engine and radioed that he was returning to Tachikawa. ATC asked if he wanted a ground-controlled approach (GCA), which Voruz accepted; during this, he could be heard shouting "Give me more power! Give me more power!" to the flight engineer. Ground control asked if he could maintain altitude; Voruz replied "Roger". However, as the pilots prepared to return to the airfield, the left wing stalled, causing the aircraft to roll to the left and enter a shallow, but unrecoverable, dive. In desperation, the pilots attempted to pull up, but in vain. Ground control asked if they were declaring emergency, but received no reply. At around 16:33, the flight disappeared from radar screens. At 16:34, the C-124 crashed into a watermelon patch about 3.5 miles from the airbase and exploded on impact.

Sergeant Frank J. Palyn, 434th ECB, who witnessed the crash from his car, said:

At this instant she seemed to hit an air pocket because she dropped. After this drop of several hundred feet she went into a left hand spiral dive. The maximum height of the plane, I would estimate to be approximately 800 to 1200 feet. At first I thought the plane would make a rough belly landing. The airplane's unusual path of flight seemed to be due to the power being furnished by the right two engines. They seemed to be pulling the plane around and dragging the left wing behind at an angle causing the spiral prior to the crash. The plane itself seemed to head towards the ground at this angle and the left wing, nose approaching the ground first with the tail at an angle to the right and above. I could not state for certain that the plane hit in this manner but can be reasonably sure because of the fraction of a second which I lost sight of it behind the hedge. Immediately upon contact with the ground she seemed to explode and burn.

The two starboard engines reportedly kept running for some time after the crash.

== Emergency responses ==
Air base and local fire department crews were soon on the scene, followed by chaplains and identification teams. A temporary morgue was set up as victims were retrieved from the wreckage.

USAF Staff Sergeant Robert D. Vess, who was driving from Tokyo with his wife, was about 150 metres (160 yd) away when he saw the aircraft lose control and crash, stating:

I was driving on route seven coming from Tokyo heading west, the time was about 16:33 or there about. My wife shouted to me to look at the airplane coming from the south heading north. As I noticed the aircraft he was heading nose down, then he abruptly pulled it up as if to gain altitude. There was a loud surge of power heard, then the aircraft stalled out on its left wing in a flat spin. It made a 160 degree turn and settled to the ground. There was a flash and then the fire started. I then was approximately 150 yards away so I pulled over to the side of the road and went to the scene. The Japanese were already at the aircraft. I walked around to the fuselage and noticed bodies, as a few more GI's [words not legible] 43rd Engineers and I started pulling the bodies out of the aircraft. The aircraft was heading south, the opposite direction of when he stalled. The airplane was in an upright position. Fire and explosions kept us from pulling any more bodies out so the military personnel there kept the Japanese from getting too close to the fire.

— Robert D. Vess

Vess immediately pulled over and ran to the crash site. He pulled the aircraft's radio operator, John H. Jordan Jr., from the wreckage, but Jordan died a few minutes later. Vess then continued to help search for survivors until the aircraft's fuel tanks exploded. Also helping to pull bodies from the wreckage was American missionary Reverend Henry McCune, who lived nearby. His son Jonathan took pictures of the wreckage with his Brownie box camera.

At 16:50, Tachikawa GCA called the 36th Air Rescue Squadron at Johnson Air Base to the crash site. Lieutenant Colonel Theodore P. Tatum Jr., his co-pilot, and a two-man pararescue team arrived on the scene via helicopter at 17:13; their subsequent inspection confirmed that there were no survivors. One of the victims, Carl C. Steele, was found in a wing compartment behind the no. 1 engine, possibly having been burned while examining it.

== Investigation ==
According to the accident report, the crash was caused by the pilots' improper flap usage and airspeed loss due to the failure of a port engine.

== Aftermath ==
Since the Tachikawa crash was the first aircraft accident in aviation history to result in more than 100 fatalities, it was heavily publicized. Although the disaster would largely be forgotten over time, it still had a great impact on families of the victims and the USAF.

The 129-person death toll remained the highest aviation fatality count until 1960, when 134 died in the collision of a United Airlines Douglas DC-8 and a Trans World Airlines Lockheed L-1049 Super Constellation over New York City. The Tachikawa crash remained the deadliest air disaster involving a single aircraft until a Boeing 707 crashed during takeoff while being operated as flight 007 by Air France in 1962.

There were no fatalities among people on the ground, but one man in the watermelon patch sustained burns to his head and hands.

Local residents erected a monument memorializing victims of the tragedy. However, the monument is no longer to be found at the site, which is now a driving school.

== See also ==
- List of deadliest aircraft accidents and incidents
- Aviation accidents in Japan involving U.S. military and government aircraft post-World War II
