= Clifford Ball (aviation) =

American aviator (1891–1972)

Cliff Ball
- Born: Clifford Ball; November 29, 1891; Banksville, Pennsylvania, U.S.
- Died: June 2, 1972 (aged 80); Pittsburgh, Pennsylvania, U.S.
- Resting place: Queen of Heaven Catholic Cemetery
- Other name: "Cliff"
- Occupation: Airline operator
- Known for: Ball Air Lines
- Spouse: Helen Marie Stinner
- Children: 1
- Military career
- Allegiance: United States
- Branch: U.S. Army (World War I); Civil Air Patrol (World War II)]
- Service years: 1918–1919; 1941–1945
- Conflicts: World War I; World War II

Clifford Ball (November 29, 1891 – June 2, 1972) was an American farmer, soldier, bookkeeper, clerk, automobile dealer, airplane dealer, airline owner, airline operator, airline executive, radio manufacturer, Civil Air Patrol officer and chaplain, and aviation pioneer.

== Early life and education ==
Ball was born November 29, 1891, in Banksville, Allegheny County, Pennsylvania. He was one of ten children born to Thomas Ball and Charlotte Ann Burrows. Both of his parents and three of his siblings emigrated from England to the U.S. in 1879. Ball graduated from McKeesport High School in 1910. Ball spent time working at his father's supply company delivering coal, operating a hoist, shoveling sand and gravel, and dispatching trucks making $90 a month. During this time his father was taking money out of his paycheck and setting it aside for Ball. Ball also worked as a clerk for a bank, and an insurance company. Ball continued his education by taking evening courses at Duquesne University and business courses at Duffs Iron City College. Ball joined the Aero Club of Pittsburgh when he was 18 years old, according to an early story. The club however, was founded in 1909 to promote an aerial demonstration, and was dormant until 1920 or so when it was restricted to WWI pilots and observers. It was not until a decade later that non-military pilots were accepted.

=== Air minded ===
His first air minded friend was Madame Alice Zeno. Madame Zeno was one of the early aeronauts to entertain crowds at fairs and other events at Calhoun Park (now Lincoln Place) in Pittsburgh between 1890 and 1909. She would hang from a trapeze suspended from a parachute attached to the bottom of a hot air balloon. Madame Zeno would ride the balloon to a height a few thousand feet above the crowd and then release the parachute from the balloon. Zeno would then ride the wind back to the earth. The first child to locate her landing spot would be rewarded with a quarter and Ball was one of the children that often collected on that reward.

== Military service ==
=== World War 1 ===
Ball joined the Army National Guard July 16, 1917, in Pittsburgh. Ball attempted to become a pilot when he enlisted but was rejected due to poor eyesight. He served during World War 1 with Troop H, 1st Cavalry Pennsylvania National Guard for a month before being transferred to the Headquarters Company of the 107th Field Artillery until he was released May 21, 1919. Ball served overseas from April 30, 1918, until May 11, 1919 (Serial # 1249860).

=== World War II ===
During WWII Ball served as a captain and chaplain in the Civil Air Patrol and managing director of district fields for Graham Aviation Flying School with its headquarters at Butler Field. On July 2, 1942, Ball was commander of the 315th group at Butler Field where he organized three squadrons of civil pilots, 7 of the 68 fliers were woman. Many served as coastal patrol in spotting submarines, such as Jacob Schlager, who returned from Atlantic Patrol Duty at the end of June 1942.

== Career ==
=== Curious auto dealer ===
After the war Ball returned to bookkeeping for a bond office for a while. He used the $5000 his father had saved for him and opened an automobile dealership called Diamond Motor Sales Company located in McKeesport. Ball became an agency for the Hudson – Essex auto manufactures as well as dealing in used cars. During his time as an automobile dealer, Ball had been fascinated by aerial demonstrations held in a field across the Monongahela River from McKeesport. The field was owned by local farmer Harry C Neel. A friend and neighbor of Neel, D Barr Peat, had made arrangements with Neel to use his property for aerial demonstrations. Peat had cleared a landing area for barnstormers to use for exhibitions and sightseeing on weekends and holidays in exchange for part of the profits they made. In July 1919 Ball had an encounter with a pilot. The pilot was in a group of traveling barnstormers that were performing in a county-wide exhibition. The pilots name was Eddie Stinson (founder Stinson Aircraft Co). Ball paid for a ride with Stinson. This $10 or $15 investment for a ride turned Ball's focus back towards aviation.

=== Building an airport ===
Ball and Peat became partners with a common goal. They had several meetings with local Congressman M Clyde Kelly to convince Kelly of the benefits in bringing aviation to the Pittsburgh area. Ball and Peat would continue to lobby for aviation with local business men while Kelly took it to congress. In 1924 Ball and Peat began to raise money to expand the airfield. Ball mortgaged everything he owned and they borrowed the rest. They used the money to buy the property from Neal for $35,000 in August 1925. (Neal used this seed money to start Jefferson Memorial Cemetery nearby) Ball was president and Peat was vice-president of the new Pittsburgh-McKeesport air field (PMA). The airfield started out on 25 acres. They used the leftover money from the purchase of the property along with additional funding, from Sam Brendel, Neel and Ball's brother Albert Ball, and they erected a building that was used as a combination machine shop, concession stand and living quarters for pilots. Peat cut down trees and ran a tractor filling in ditches adding an additional 18 acres of useful space to the airfield. Ball would stage aerial stunts and plane rides as well as running the concession stand. In 1925 Ball hired a secretary, Helen Marie Stinner (later his wife), who also acted as gatekeeper and ticket taker.

=== Entertaining the crowds ===
The traveling barnstormers charged $5 a plane ride, and the airfield received $1 of that. In a week the airfield made about $250. In August officials of the local American Legion, Burt Foster post No. 361, signed a contract with PMA to hold an airplane meet. With the money from the Legion contract Ball expanded the airfield from 43 to 85 acres. Ball bought his own plane from the Robertson Aircraft Corporation of St Louis, whose pilot and instructor was named Charles A Lindbergh. The plane had been named "Fly Today" and was a Standard J-1 in rough shape. It was suggested by Lindbergh based on the money Ball had to spend. Ball hired a local stunt flyer named Romer Weyant to fly his airplane for the Sunday and Holiday events. In September, the Pittsburgh-McKeesport airfield attempted to bring more interest to the new airport by hosting "The Battle in the Clouds" which was a reenactment of a French Balloon being shot down from 8,000 feet by hostile planes. Stunt flying and Army Air Planes were also on site for the crowd to enjoy. PMA held the Legion Aviation Meet on October 17 and 18, 1925. The Legion meet was termed the largest air meet ever held in the state of Pennsylvania. It was estimated that more than 10,000 people attended. Over 100 planes came from across the country, with military and commercial aces, to participate. The crowd was witness to races, stunts, wing walking, skywriting, and parachute jumps. The meet was held with the co-operation of the Aero Club of Pittsburgh and the Technical Data Section of the Army Air Service.

=== Expanding aviation ===
In January after the passing of what became known as the Kelly Airmail Act, Pittsburgh Postmaster George W Gosser recommended PMA as the best local field to use as a feeder line for receiving and shipping the U.S. Mail. As president of PMA, Ball went on a tour of the Airports along the transcontinental Airmail route to inspect aircraft, equipment and best practices to bring back for use at the airfield. During this trip Ball visited the Swallow Airplane Company in Wichita, Kansas, to inspect a new fleet of Air Mail planes being produced. In preparation for bidding on one of the air mail routes Ball founded the "Skyline Transport Company" (STC), better known as "Clifford Ball, Inc", and submitted a bid on March 25 for Contract Air Mail route 11 (CAM-11) to fly Airmail between Pittsburgh, PA and Cleveland, OH. Late in March the Postal Authorities notified Ball they would visit Pittsburgh-McKeesport airfield to inspect the facility prior to any contract being awarded. Ball continued searching for ways to bring business into the Airport and in January he was able to convince the Swallow Airplane Co to build an assembly plant at the Airport. Immediately they began shipping airplane parts to be assembled at PMA. Some planes were assembled and Ball acted as a local distributor and salesman for the new Swallow aircraft selling a few planes while waiting for the new plant to be built. However the plant never materialized. On March 27, 1926, STC won the bid for CAM 11 and was awarded the Government Contract starting on May 1. Ball was the only bidder on the route and planned to begin operations on July 1 with three Swallow Aircraft.

Ball had flown over 100 hours but the contract from his bondman for STC stated he could not fly for five years. The Pittsburgh-McKeesport airfield "informally" opened to the public on June 19, 1926, with a free exhibition of acrobatic flying by the air mail pilots. The airmail service official opening was delayed by a Government requirement for heavier planes. The field "officially" opened to the public on July 20, 1926, by holding an Air Circus with 10 stunt fliers to entertain the crowds with acrobatic maneuvers, altitude flights and races. Ball announced that this will be the Headquarters of the Pittsburgh-Cleveland Air Mail service slated to start in about 2 months after acquiring appropriate planes.

On May 31, 1928, the airfield hosted the National Elimination Balloon Races with more than 150,000 people in attendance. The added seats for the event were widely used on future weekends and holidays for people to sit and watch the airport activities. It was around this time that the first requirements of the physical exam for a pilot license, even for students, were created. Pilots across the state begin bringing their damaged planes to Bettis for repairs due to the growing reputation of the Pittsburgh-McKeesport airfield.

=== Renaming the field ===
Less than four months after the official opening of the Pittsburgh-McKeesport airfield, the PMA name was changed. On November 26, 1926, approximately 75 airplanes were used in the formal dedication of Bettis Aviation Field, named for Lieutenant Cyrus K. Bettis, a well known aviator that was killed in a crash near Bellefonte, PA. After a dedication speech was made former squadron mates of Bettis took to the sky in there Curtiss P-1 Hawk pursuit planes to make their dedication to him above the crowd. Some of the aircraft on display at the event were the Douglas C-1, a huge twin-motored Martin NBS-1 bomber, and a Fokker Special monoplane. In attendance were Ithrene Bettis, sister of the fallen aviator; Myrtle Peacock, his fiancée; Congressman M Clyde Kelly; William P MacCracken, Jr, assistant secretary of commerce and director of commercial aviation; George W Gosser, Pittsburgh postmaster; George H Lysle, mayor of McKeesport; Colonel H C Fry, chairman of the aviation board of the Pittsburgh Chamber of Commerce; and Captain Thomas S Voss, in charge of Rodgers Airfield northeast of downtown Pittsburgh.

=== Airmail contract ===
Ball ordered four new OX-5 powered Waco 9 type biplanes to meet the new government requirements and by the morning of April 19 two were at the field. Ball sent his Chief Pilot and head of the Operating Division, Merle A "Moup" Moltrup, on a test run. Flying the new Waco 9, "Miss Pittsburgh", from Bettis to Youngstown and then on to Cleveland and back while Ball and the postmaster timed the run in preparation for the opening. Two of the new Waco 9's had arrive and a third was expected.

==== Airmail route inauguration ====
The new Pittsburgh-Cleveland, via Youngstown, Air Mail route was inaugurated on April 21, 1927. "Miss Youngstown" ”Miss Pittsburgh" and "Miss McKeesport" flew out of Bettis on the 20th to partake in celebrations at Cleveland and Youngstown. The three planes were then loaded for the first mail to return to Bettis. Some of those on hand were the director of Bettis Field, Ball; superintendent of the field, D Barr Peat; Superintendent of Air Mail contracts of Washington, Earl B Wadsworth; Local postmaster, George W Gosser; Superintendent of Mail, L E Palmer, a veteran of the mail service for 55 years; Assistant Postmaster, James B Anderson; Superintendent of motor vehicles, David B Wilson; Assistant Secretary of Commerce in charge of Aeronautics, William P MacCracken, Jr and Congressman Clyde Kelly, father of the airmail bill.

Undaunted by rain a crowd of 5000 to 7000 cheered the arrival of two little speaks emerging from the storm clouds, drowning out the brass band. "Miss Youngstown" piloted by "Moup" with Arthur J Lynch, traffic manager, as a passenger were first to land with the first airmail for Pittsburgh. "Miss Pittsburgh" piloted by Dewey L Noyes landed soon after. Miss Carrie Dickson officially christened "Miss Pittsburgh" while Miss Louise Helmstead officially christened "Miss McKeesport" once the delayed plane arrived piloted by Kenneth F "Curly" Lovejoy. Miss Youngstown followed by Miss Pittsburgh were re-loaded and took off for their outbound trips. Planes from the U.S. Army Reserve field at Aspinwall escorted them to Youngstown. The escort including Capt Thomas S Voss, commandant of Rodgers field; Col Harry C Fry Jr, chairman of the aviation committee of Pittsburgh chamber of commerce; Capt John Dake, Frank J Ambrose, John A Broderick, J J Feery and E W Thompson. On April 4, 1929, pilot Dewyey Noyes made the first night flight on the airmail route.

=== Tragedy for Ball Airmail Service ===
On June 25, 1927, pilot Clyde Emerick crashed at Bettis. Emerick worked for Johnson Airplane and Supply Co. at Al Johnson's Wilmington Pike airfield in the downtown Dayton, Ohio, area. The plane was taking off and one of the two engines of the Johnson – 60 type failed about 100 feet off the ground. The plane crashed to the ground throwing the pilot into the spinning propeller. He was rushed to McKeesport Hospital in an ambulance suffering a compound fracture of the skull. The plane had stopped at Bettis for the night and was resuming the following morning when the crash occurred. The plane had minor damage with wrecked landing gear. Clyde Emerick succumbs to his injuries and died July 6 at McKeesport hospital, his wife by his side. His passenger G F Gerber, of Johnstown, PA crawled from the wrecked plane unhurt.

=== A surprise visitor ===
Colonel Lindbergh made a landing for fuel on June 29, 1927. A pair of Curtis pursuit planes landing at the airport was not news. The first plane pulled within a few feet of the hangar after landing. Its pilot was not recognized until he removed his goggles and smiled. Lindbergh had a deep interest in Bettis Field and asked many questions and gave congratulations on the mail contract. Word got out and the field was soon crowded with admirers. However, most had missed him. It only took 35 minutes for the two planes to be topped with fuel and Lindbergh and his companion Major Landphiers (Cmdr of 1sr pursuit Sq) finished some barbecue sandwiches before they took off for St. Louis.

=== Lindbergh Goodwill Tour ===
The popularity of aviation was growing fast and on August 23, 1927, Bettis field got another boost when Charles Lindbergh landed at the field in his Ryan monoplane during his 22,000-mile, 82-city tour Goodwill Tour. The airfield was packed to overflowing with people waiting for the arrival of Lindbergh. People lined the roads from Bettis field to downtown Pittsburgh to get a look at the new hero as his motorcade headed to the reception area. Lindbergh required that his airplane be hangared. Because of its wingspan, it had to be slid in sideways on greased rails. Lindbergh left the next day to the cheers of more than 30,000 people.

=== Pittsburgh School of Aviation ===
With the Airmail contract secured, in June Ball added a flying school at the field called "Pittsburgh School of Aviation", formerly known as Bob Trader's Flying School. The school had both a ground and flying course. Ball organizing the school patterned after the flying clubs of England and the United States. Students were trained in the Waco aircraft, as Bettis was a distribution center for the manufacture, Advance Aircraft Co of Troy, Ohio. The students were called the "Bettis Field Cadets" and by April it was co-ed. Catherine and Louise Reiff, Collett Rohaus, Olive Herskovitz, Helen Richey, Mrs Ida Snyder Wilson, and Mrs Edna Wolf were some of the early female student fliers.

A local newspaper ad read:

Pittsburgh School of Aviation, School Bldg., Bettis Field, Pittsburgh-McKeesport Blvd, Flying instruction every day by Ex-Army Pilots. Actual work on airplanes and motors, with theory of flight, to prepare you for our flying lessons, only $10 for complete course of 10 nights.

=== Passenger service ===
Along with the Aviation School Ball added a passenger service. Expanding from the two-seat biplanes, Ball first purchased a Ryan Brougham (#5552). When the route was lengthened, Ball added a Pitcairn Mailwing with a J-5 engine and a J-5 powered Travel Air, the first plane equipped with landing lights, navigation lights and flares. Ball continued to expand service by making connections with other airlines, such as Stout Airlines, to extend service to the public. In June Ball ordered three Fairchild FC-2 cabin monoplanes, with the first being delivered on the 9th. In August 1929 the passenger service was then extended to Washington, D C landing just across the Potomac River at Hoover Field.

By January 1929 Ball, now the sole owner of the CAM 11 contract, had run successfully for two years. At that time the government exercised its option to extend the contract for the full eight years. With the guarantee of another six years of airmail service Ball built a new hangar to hold 22 aircraft with a second to be built the following month. At this time Ball had six planes in the airmail service to Cleveland. Ball expanded his growing list of aircraft with a Ford tri-motor, another Fairchild FC-2, five New Standard D-27, and seven Waco 9's as payment for a storage charge.

On April 28, 1929, the first passengers, 4 men in a Fairchild FC-2 from Pittsburgh to Cleveland, opened the newly named "Path of the Eagle" passenger service. This date is used by the National Safety Council to mark the commencement of the unmatched safety record that Ball and succeeding companies have made over this route.

In August Ball had pilot Frank Dayton take him to Harrisburg for a demand certificate to operate a taxi service there. Along for his firsts plane ride was Pittsburgh Postmaster George W Gosser. During the first week of October Clifford Ball Inc expanding its "Path of the Eagle" offerings from Detroit to Washington, D.C., connecting with Stout Air Lines at Cleveland.

==== Ball Airline merger ====
After the passing of the Air Mail Act of 1930 many small airlines were forced to merge in order to meet the new government requirements. Ball merged his Cleveland-Pittsburgh-Washington passenger line with the new Pennsylvania Air Lines (PAL). Officers of the new "Path of the Eagle" were Ball as president and general manager; R Park Marshall as vice-president and director; Arthur Ball as secretary and treasurer; and W C Smith as Director. The merger would keep Pittsburgh on the feeder line connecting the transcontinental route. Synchronizing the "Path of the Eagle" allowed travel from Oakland, CA to NY using connections with Boeing Lines, Pittsburgh Airways, Stout Air Lines, and Western Air Express. With the merger came new services and rates encompassing all Ball's business. Ball added passenger service to Cleveland, Chicago, St. Louis and St. Paul. Service between New Castle, Chicago, and Washington was added. The Akron, Youngstown, and New Castle line was inaugurated by the Tri-motored Ford piloted by R L Baker. And the use of the new Adams airmail pick-up device in cities between Pittsburgh and Cleveland was started for the smaller towns without airfield. Another first for Pittsburgh was the new service of Week-end air trip excursions to Cleveland and Washington and Sunday Service. Because of improved patronage and equipment Ball reduced rates four times within one year.

=== Ball Aviation Company transferred ===
Clifford Ball Aviation Company was purchased by Pittsburgh Aviation Industries Corporation (PAIC), a holding company, November 4, 1930, after the president of PAIC, George R Hann, and Ball came to an agreement. No changes or additions to the service were made and the new organization would continue to operate under the name Pennsylvania Air Line, Inc (PAL). Ball was retained as vice-president in charge of Operations and general manager. PIAC executive secretary Richard W Robbins was made President. PAIC had established the Pittsburgh-Butler airport, the Penn School of Aviation and the Pittsburgh Aerial Surveys company and had recently affiliated with Transcontinental and Western Inc to establish a coast-to-coast all air passengers' service via Pittsburgh.

==== Resigns post ====
Ball transferred all of his participating interest in PAL to PAIC and resigned from PAL on October 2, 1933, without any explanation. Ball had been vice-president in charge of operations since selling his "Path of the Eagle" passenger and airmail line to PAIC. Ball gave no reason for his withdrawal from PAL only stated he was going on an indefinite leave of absence, going to the World Series and then heading to Florida for a rest.

== Testifies to Congress ==
Ball testified before the Congress at the Air Mail Cancellation Hearings that Richard W Robbins and George R Hann, of Sewickley Heights, in colluding with Postmaster Brown schemed to defame him in order to award his contract to their PAIC, which took over Ball's Pennsylvania Air Lines. PAIC was supposedly allied with the Mellon interests.

Ball was charged before the Senate airmail committee that former Postmaster-General Walter F Brown and officials of the PIAC, participated in "a well planned scheme to defame" his character in 1930.

Ball testified that Brown fined him $5,000 for carrying "unlawful" mail. This accusation was made to Ball directly and among friends and acquaintances by George R Hann and Richard W Robbins of PAIC. The scheme was to defame Ball in order to carry out their plan of transferring the mail contract to PAIC even though PAIC did not operate an airline at the time, which was a requirement. According to Ball and other witness testimony during the meetings on Airmail Hann stated,

"We're here to get our share of the airmail dollar."

— George R Hann,

We have influence with Senator (David A) Reed (Rep., PA), and two cabinet officers and will go into the White House if we have to.

— George R Hann,

== Late career ==
=== Radio manufacturing ===
In 1938 Ball is listed as vice-president of Hotel Radio & Equipment Company and Voco Radio Manufacturing Company. He remained active with the radio equipment business until 1947 based on Pittsburgh directories of the time. Voco was located in the old Point Building at the intersection of Penn and Water, currently Point State Park. Albert M Greenfield & Co leased space on the fourth floor of the Point Building for the Point Land Company to the Voco Radio Manufacturing Company, Inc., for the manufacture, sale and servicing of radios and radio equipment.

=== Return to the air ===
Ball spent some time working for Taylorcraft Aircraft of Conway, PA and was a member of the airport advisory committee before being brought in as the first superintendent of the Greater Pittsburgh Airport (GPA), which opened April 23, 1952. Ball was chosen as vice-president in charge of operations of the GPA beginning May 15. The airport was touted as the second largest in the nation at the time. Ball was in direct charge of pilots and planes. His office was equipped with all the latest meteorological instruments so that he had the news on the weather from 42 different stations. He held this position until October 1955, when he went to the Allegheny County Airport as manager and director until 1958.

== OX-5 Club ==
Ball started the OX-5 Club after Charlie Carroll, the operator of the Latrobe, Pennsylvania, airport, came to the Aero Club of Pittsburgh in June of 55' with the idea of arranging a rally for OX-5 pilots. At the first meeting officers were selected and Ball was made national secretary. To Ball's surprise 107 pilots registered for the first gathering of the new club. By the end of '56 that numbers had reached 990 and in '57 it was 4,249. By 1980 membership of the OX-5 club had grown to more than 12,000 members.

== Death ==
Ball died of heart failure at his office in the OX-5 club and Aero Club headquarters in downtown Pittsburgh June 2, 1972. According to Flora Balmer, the secretary for decades, Ball simply collapsed at his desk.

== Honors and tributes ==
- May 31, 1936: Ball was honored with a lifetime pass by D Walter Swan, Central's vice-president in charge of traffic, during a banquet in Cleveland held by Central Airlines.
- June 26, 1972: United Air Lines celebrated its 45th year of scheduled air service to Pittsburgh and with nearly 60 civic and business leader in attendance Ball was presented with a plaque recognizing his "foresight and courage" starting his pioneering air mail service from Pittsburgh to Cleveland during a special breakfast at Duquesne Club.
- Ball was a member of VFW post number 285.
- Ball was a member of the Aero Club of Pittsburgh joining in 1919 and was elected president for 30 years.
- In 1965 the Pittsburgh Institute of Aeronautics and their mechanics' school dedicated its $80,000 Clifford Ball Academic Building and Ball was honored as Pittsburgh's "Grand old man of aviation."
- In 1976 Ball was honored with a tree planting in the International Forest of Friendship in Atchison, Kansas.
- In April 1995 Ball's airplane "Miss Pittsburgh", after having been found and restored with the help of the OX-5 Club, was put on display at Pittsburgh International Airport.
- In 1996 jam band Phish performed in a live outdoor 3-day concert named The Clifford Ball at the former Air Force Base in Plattsburgh, NY.
- In 2000 Hyatt Regency Hotel opened at the Pittsburgh International Airport and its presidential suite was dedicated the "Clifford Ball Suite".
- May 14, 2011: The first performance of the play "Pittsburgh's Mr Aviation" at the Playhouse Jr of the Pittsburgh Playhouse. The play, by Yoli, was performed by a cast from Point Park University for 5th and 6th grade school children.
- Allegheny County Port Authority buses carried an image of Ball and his name on the side of buses for a time.
