= Miss Pittsburgh =

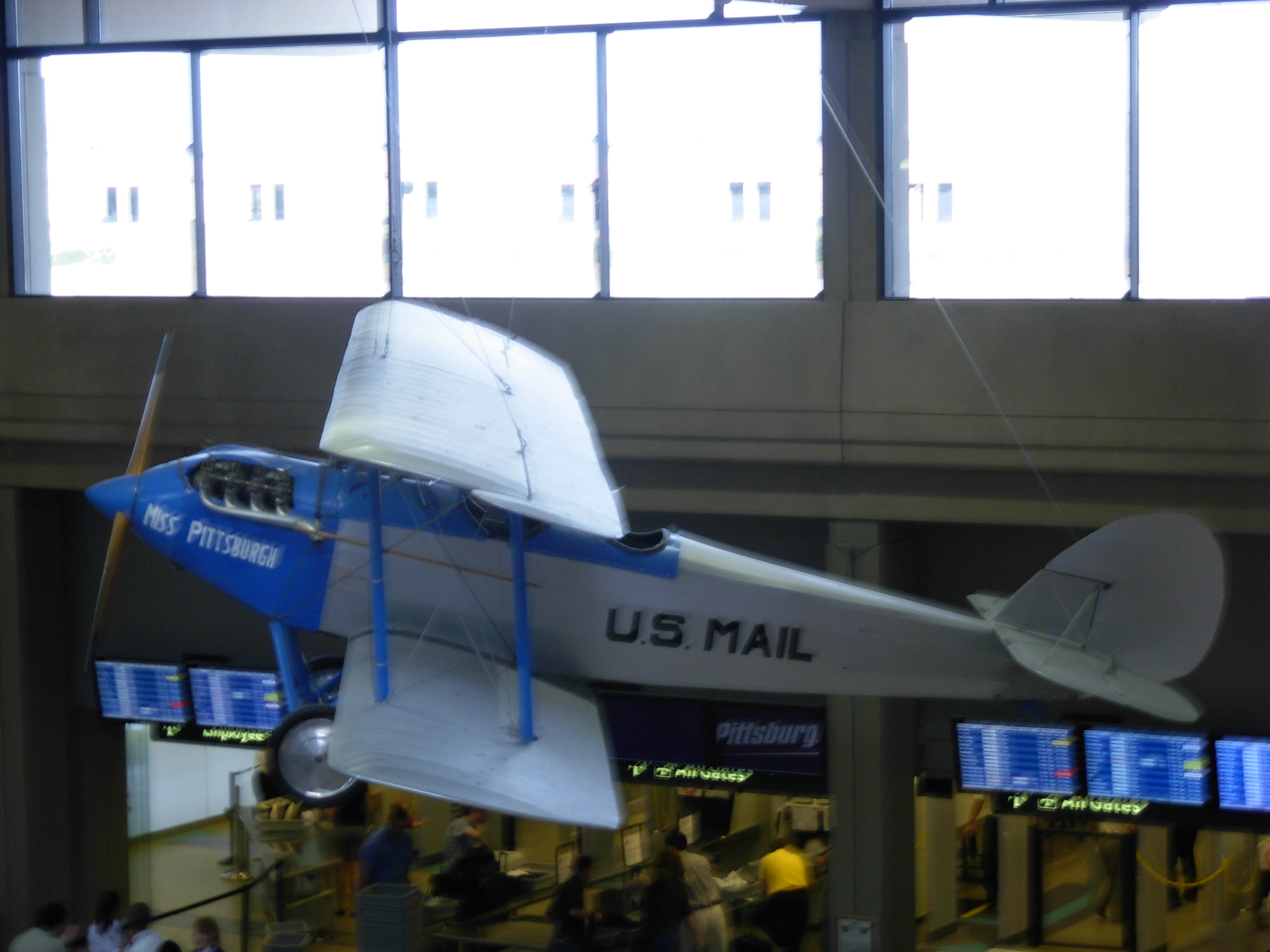

General information
- Type: Waco 9
- Manufacturer: Advance Aircraft Company

History
- Preserved at: displayed at the Pittsburgh International Airport Landside Terminal

Miss Pittsburgh is a historic Waco 9 airplane, powered by a Curtiss OX-5 engine, known for making the first airmail flight from Pittsburgh, Pennsylvania to Cleveland, Ohio on 21 April 1927.^{[a]} Miss Pittsburgh was rediscovered and restored by OX 5 Aviation Pioneers, and is now displayed at the Pittsburgh International Airport Landside Terminal.

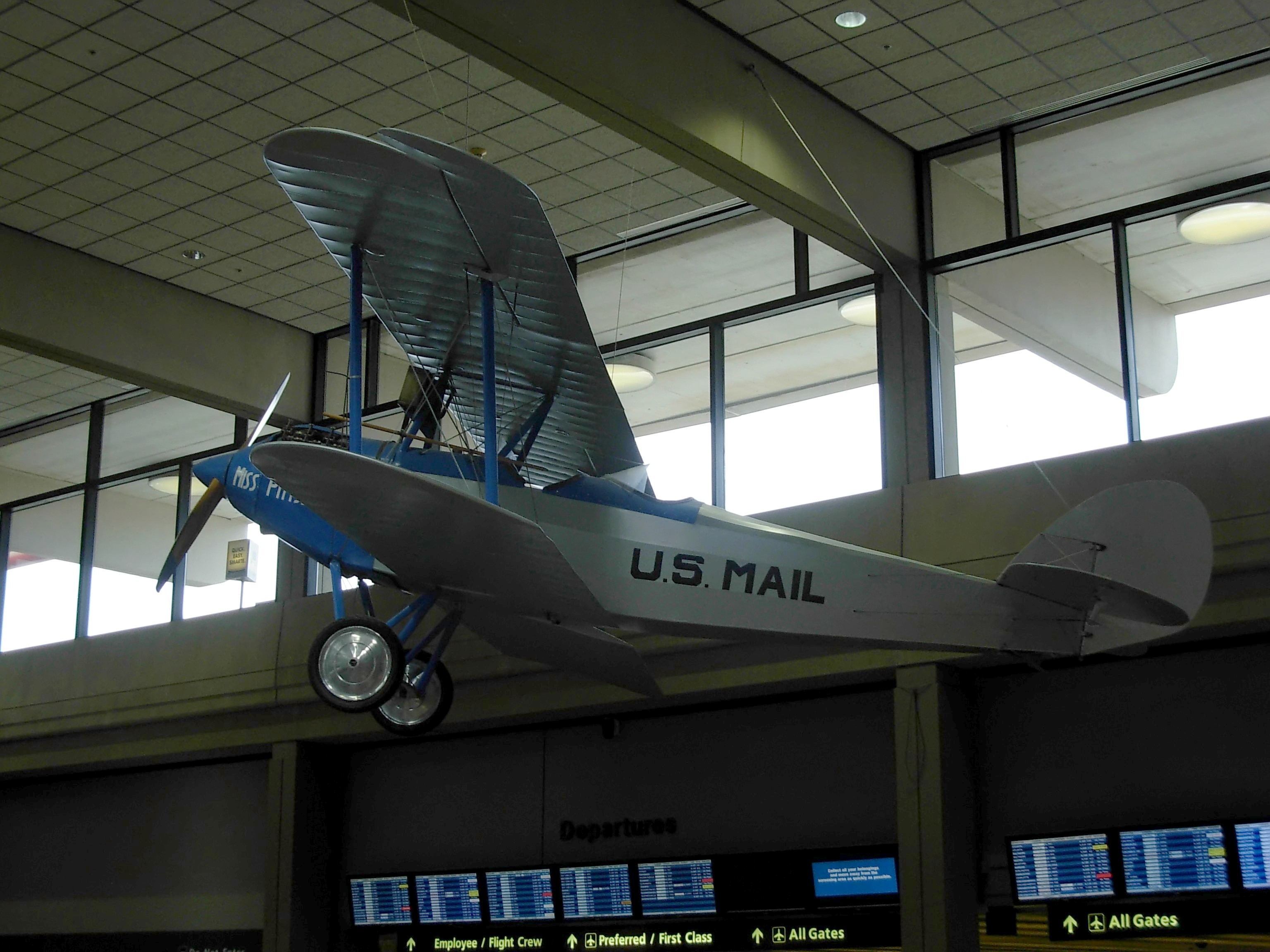
Miss Pittsburgh

== Design and performance ==
Miss Pittsburgh was a Waco 9, built by the Advance Aircraft Company, latterly known as Waco, powered by a Curtiss OX-5 engine. Miss Pittsburgh's fuselage was built from metal tubing covered with cotton cloth and the wings were made of spruce. Miss Pittsburgh could transport up to 800 pounds at a speed reaching 100 miles per hour, usually at an altitude between 1,000–5,000 ft (300–1,520 m).

== History ==
Miss Pittsburgh's first owner was Clifford A. Ball, formerly an auto-mobile dealer who acquired several aircraft as compensation for unpaid storage charges at the Bettis Field, an airport near McKeesport, in which he had a controlling interest. The first airmail flight took off at around noon, 21 April 1927, on a 121 mi (105 nmi; 195 km) route from Pittsburgh, Pennsylvania to Cleveland, Ohio. The US Post Office Department awarded Ball Contract Air Mail No. 11 for this route, and he expanded Skyline Transportation Company by buying two more Waco 9s (Miss Youngstown and Miss McKeesport). Skyline Transportation Company acquired more aircraft, was renamed to Cliff Ball Mail Line and was later renamed Pennsylvania Airlines, Pennsylvania Central Airline, Capital Airlines and finally became a part of United Airlines.

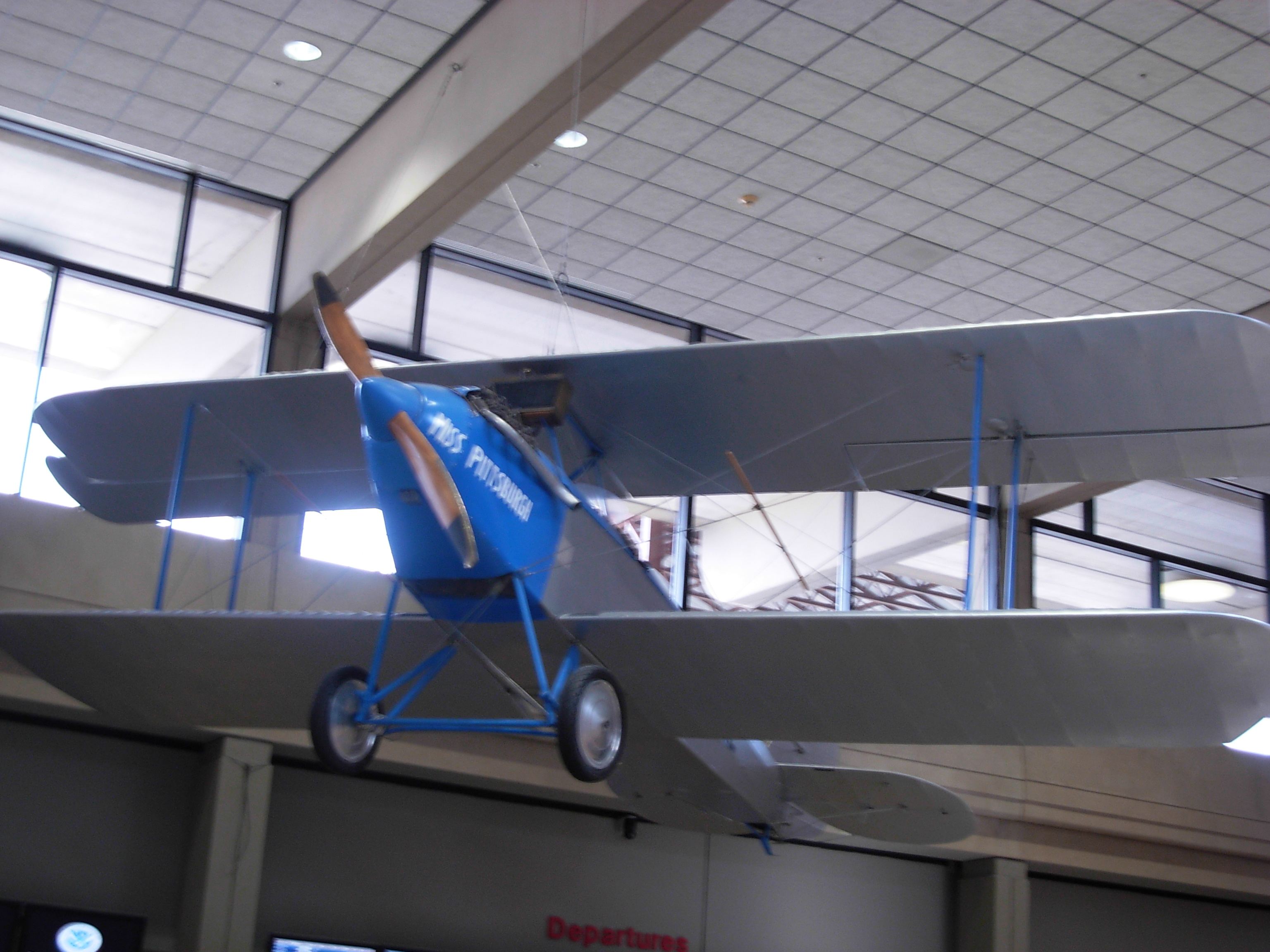
Miss Pittsburgh

As the Waco 9s became obsolete, Miss Pittsburgh found its way to Florida, where the airplane was used for advertising in the 1960s, eventually becoming derelict in New York. In 1993, the OX 5 Pioneers located the aircraft at the Rhinebeck New York Aerodrome. With the support of the Pittsburgh Institute of Aeronautics the group raised money to have the airplane returned to Pittsburgh and after renovation, it was displayed at the Pittsburgh International Airport Landside Terminal.

== Specifications (Waco 9 with Curtiss OX-5 engine) ==
Data from

General characteristics

- Crew: 1
- Capacity: 2 passengers or a payload of 800 lb (360 kg)
- Length: 23 ft 4 in (7.11 m)
- Wingspan: 29 ft 6 in (8.99 m)
- Powerplant: 1 × Curtiss OX-5 V-8 90° air-cooled piston engine, 90 hp (67 kW)

Performance

- Maximum speed: 92 mph (148 km/h, 80 kn)
- Cruise speed: 79 mph (127 km/h, 69 kn)
- Stall speed: 32 mph (51 km/h, 28 kn)
- Range: 400 mi (640 km, 350 nmi)

== Notes ==
a Miss Pittsburgh was the first airplane to deliver airmail in the Pittsburgh and Cleveland region, but not the first in the world, nor even the first in the United States.
