= Flight 410 =

Flight 410 may refer to:

- Pennsylvania Central Airlines Flight 410, crashed on 13 June 1947
- Avianca Flight 410, crashed on 17 March 1988
