= History of aviation in Pittsburgh =

Aviation history in the Pittsburgh region is one of the richest in the world. With the first regularly scheduled air mail service and a leading region in manufacture and innovation during both World Wars, the Pittsburgh area has much to discover about aviation's past. From Bettis Field and the Allegheny County Airport, to the modern Pittsburgh International Airport (PIT), the city continues to play an important role in the industry and science of flight.

== Gustave Whitehead ==
According to a book and newspaper story from the 1930s, Gustave Whitehead made a very early motorized flight of about half a mile in Pittsburgh in April or May 1899. Aviation experts debated the topic, and a few decided for Whitehead, while the great majority, such as Charles Harvard Gibbs-Smith, said the flights could not have occurred.

== Pittsburgh International Airport ==
=== Origins as air base ===
Until the beginning of World War II, Moon Township was mostly a rural agricultural area. It was too far from Pittsburgh to be considered the "suburb" that it is today. In the early 1920s, John A. Bell of Carnegie purchased a number of small farms in Moon and established a major commercial dairy farm on his 1,900 acres (8 km^{2}) of land. He was bought out by Mr. and Mrs. Edward E. Rieck and C.F. Nettrour, owners of the established "Rieck's Dairy", who doubled the number of cattle at the farm.

By 1940, the United States was becoming involved in World War II. The Works Progress Administration (WPA) identified that the Pittsburgh area needed a military airport to defend the industrial wealth of the area, and provide a training base and stop-over facility. The agricultural expanses of Moon Township were attractive to the early airport planners in the city. The WPA bought the Bell Farm and began construction of the runways.

=== As a commercial airport ===
In 1944, Allegheny County officials proposed to expand the military airport with the addition of a commercial passenger terminal. The new terminal would replace the Allegheny County Airport which opened in 1926 in West Mifflin. Ground was broken on the new airport on July 18, 1946. The new terminal building would eventually cost $33 million to build and was built exclusively by Pittsburgh-area companies. The Greater Pittsburgh Airport opened on May 31, 1952. The first flight occurred on June 3, 1952. In its full year of operation in 1953, over 1.4 million passengers used the terminal. At that time, it was considered "modern" and spacious. In fact, the airport was one of the largest in the United States, second only to Idlewild Airport (now JFK Airport) in New York.

=== Original terminal ===
Greater Pittsburgh Airport, circa 1977.

The airport was designed by a local architect named Josep W. Hoover. One of the primary features of his style is the use of simple, exposed concrete, steel, and glass materials. The terminal building was constructed in "stepped" levels: the first floor extended farther than the second, the second floor extended farther than the third, etc. Such a design meant that the uncovered roof of the lower level could then be used as an observation deck. In addition to the observation decks, the rounded "Horizon Room" was designed on the fourth floor with a commanding view of the airport runways. The interior of the terminal building was designed in the International Style, as was the exterior. One of the most memorable features of the lobby was the large compass laid in the floor with the green and yellow-orange terrazzo. The lobby also included shops and services for travelers. A mobile by Alexander Calder was another decorative feature of the lobby. The mobile currently hangs in the center core of the new airside terminal.

The first five airlines of the Greater Pittsburgh Airport were TWA, Capital Airlines (later part of United Airlines), Northwest, All American (later it became Allegheny Airlines, USAir, and finally US Airways), and Eastern Airlines.

In 1959, the east dock was added to the terminal as air travel became more popular. On July 25, 1959, TWA introduced the first scheduled commercial jet service (Douglas DC- 8) to Pittsburgh. With the longer range of jet engines, international air travel was more practical. On July 1, 1968 international airport status was obtained with the dedication of the first customs office at the complex. Ground was broken for the new International Wing, west of the original terminal building, on July 8, 1970. The International Wing opened in 1972 to accommodate federal inspection services and expansions for international travel to Europe, the Caribbean, Japan, and Canada.

In 1972, rotundas were added to the end of each dock to further expand the number of gates at the terminal. In the later 1970s, significant growth in regional air travel created a need for additional gates at the terminal. In 1980, the South East Dock was opened. Even with all the expansions, the terminal could not meet the needs of modern air travel. Operations moved into the new Midfield Terminal in 1992.

=== New terminal ===
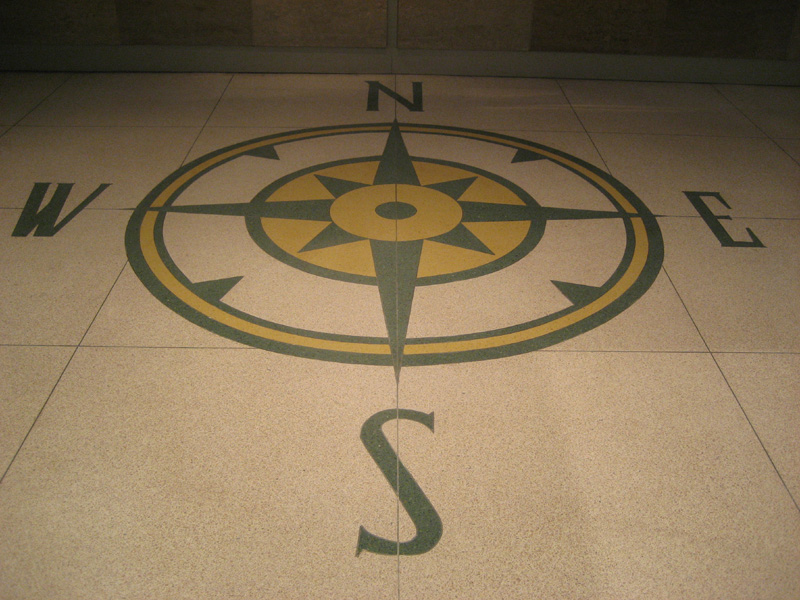
Clock floor re-creation

On October 1, 1992, the new Midfield Terminal opened and all operations transferred over from the old terminal. Pittsburgh International's Midfield Terminal brought a new vision to the region for domestic and international air travel. Designed to be the nation's best gateway to international commerce, PIT is within a 90-minute flight of 70 percent of North America's population. Capacity is one of PIT's most valuable assets. A model to other airports around the world, the design of the terminal was planned to simplify aircraft movement on the airfield and ease pedestrian traffic to the gates.

Since opening, PIT's Midfield Terminal has been recognized on numerous occasions for its efficient and creative ways to assist travelers. PIT has become a major economic generator for southwestern Pennsylvania. And it continues to grow. In the last year, airlines have launched new service from PIT, new routes have been added, and development surrounding the airfield is growing.

Source: Sections of the history taken from the Yesterday's Airport of Tomorrow display located inside the Pittsburgh Airport.

== Aircraft accidents ==
=== At PIT ===
- November 22, 2001 a corporate Learjet crashed after a rapid takeoff in which it went "nose-high" before the pilot lost control. Both on board were killed.
- September 8, 1994 USAir Flight 427, a Boeing 737-300, crashed on approach from Chicago O'Hare International Airport. All 132 people on board were killed. It resulted in the longest and most thorough NTSB investigation in world history. It was determined that a lock occurred in rudder control that caused the plane to fall uncontrollably from 6,000 feet (1,800 m). Boeing has retrofitted every 737 because of the data gathered from this crash. The plane crashed roughly 10 miles (20 km) North-Northwest in Hopewell Township.
- April 1, 1956 TWA Flight 400, A Martin 4-0-4, to Newark, New Jersey crashed about a half mile after taking off when the pilot and co-pilot did not immediately correct a small engine malfunction/fire. Due to miscommunication and lack of focus it caused failure and a crash. 22 of 36 were killed.

=== At other locations ===
- January 31, 1956, a B-25 crashed into the Monongahela River; the aircraft still has not been found, as of 2015.

== Heliports ==
Several heliports serve the downtown Pittsburgh area.
