= Curtiss R3C =

1925 American racing aircraft

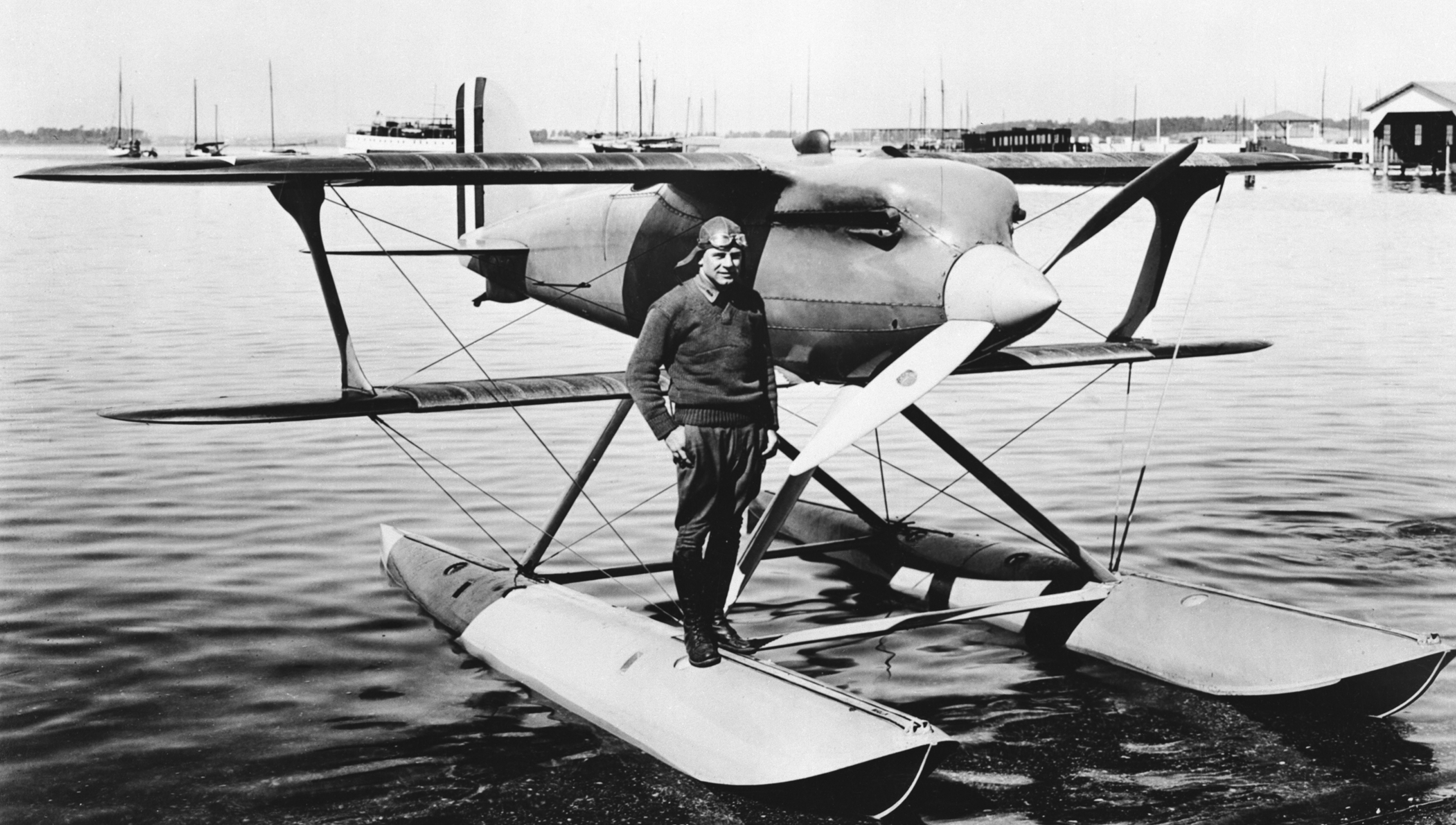
- Curtiss R3C-2

General information
- Type: Racing aircraft
- Manufacturer: Curtiss Aeroplane and Motor Company
- Primary users: US Navy US Army
- Number built: 3

History
- Introduction date: 1925
- First flight: 18 September 1925
- Developed from: Curtiss R2C

The Curtiss R3C is an American racing aircraft built in landplane and floatplane form. It was a single-seat biplane built by the Curtiss Aeroplane and Motor Company.

The R3C-1 was the landplane version and Cyrus Bettis won the Pulitzer Trophy Race in one on 12 October 1925 with a speed of 248.9 mph (400.6 km/h).

The R3C-2 was a twin float seaplane built for the Schneider Trophy race. In 1925, from 23 to 26 October, it took place on the Chesapeake Bay in Baltimore, Maryland. With 232.57 mph (374.29 km/h), pilot Jimmy Doolittle won the trophy with a Curtiss R3C-2. The other two R3C-2s, piloted by George Cuddihy and Ralph Oftsie, did not reach the finish line. The next day, with the same plane on a straight course, Doolittle reached 245.7 mph (395.4 km/h), a new world record. For the next Schneider Trophy, which took place on 13 November 1926, the R3C-2's engine was further improved, and pilot Christian Franck Schilt took second place with 231.364 mph (372.344 km/h).

== Operators ==
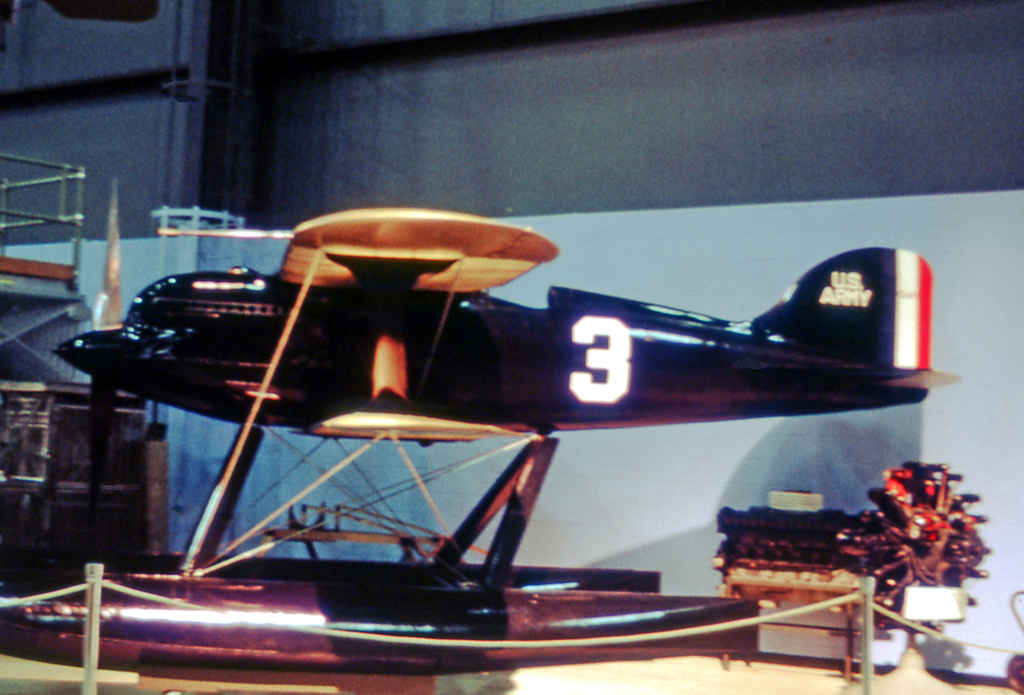
The surviving R3C-2 is displayed at the NASM near Washington

United States

- United States Navy - two examples
- United States Army Air Service - one example

== Survivors ==
The R3C-2 that Jimmy Doolitle piloted to victory in the 1925 Schneider Trophy race is preserved at the National Air and Space Museum's Steven F. Udvar-Hazy Centre, at Washington Dulles Airport, Virginia. It still wears its '3' 1925 racing number.

== Specifications (R3C-2) ==
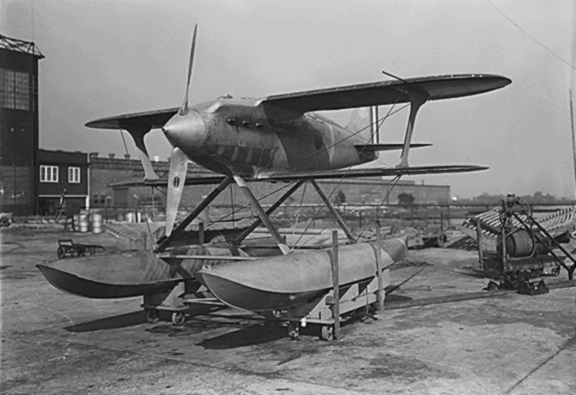
The R3C-3 at the Naval Aircraft Factory in 1926.

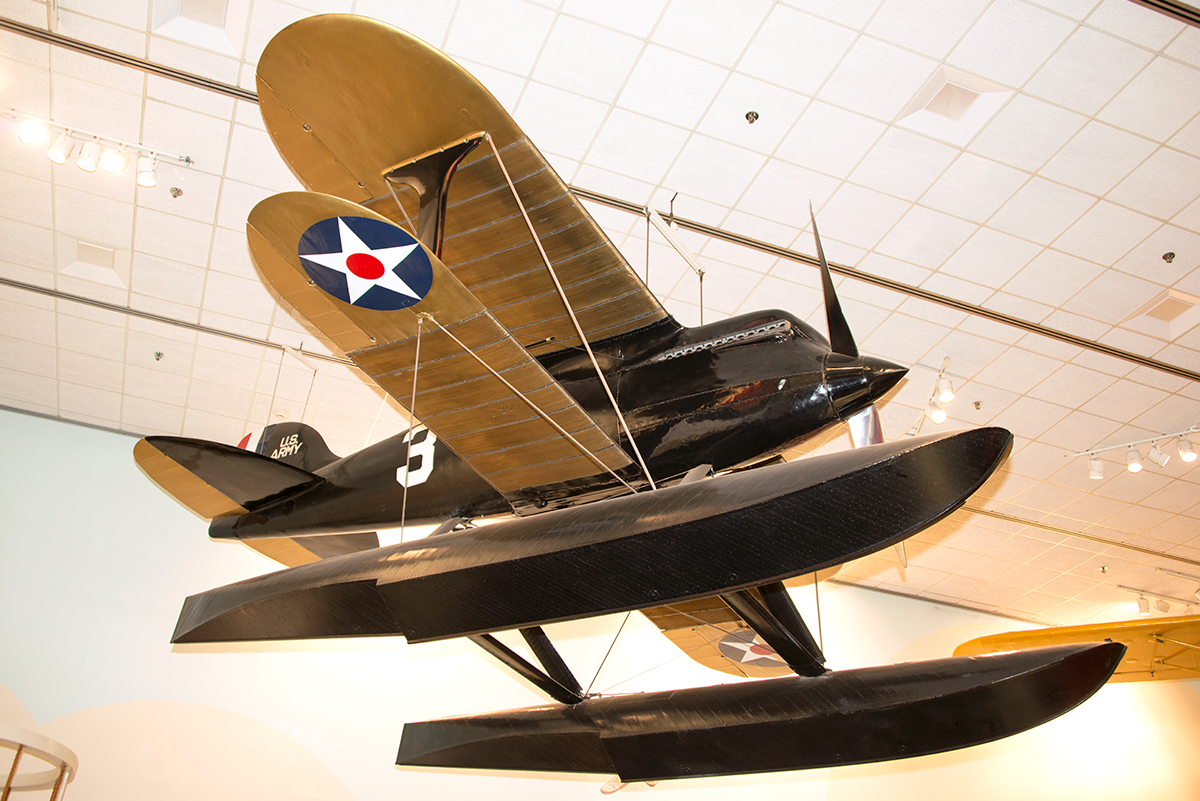
Curtiss R3C-2 at the Barron Hilton Pioneers of Flight Gallery at the National Air and Space Museum, Washington, D.C.

Data from Curtiss Aircraft 1907–1947

General characteristics

- Crew: 1
- Length: 22 ft 0 in (6.71 m)
- Wingspan: 22 ft 0 in (6.71 m)
- Height: 10 ft 4 in (3.15 m)
- Wing area: 144 sq ft (13.4 m^{2})
- Airfoil: Curtiss C-80
- Empty weight: 2,135 lb (968 kg)
- Gross weight: 2,738 lb (1,242 kg)
- Powerplant: 1 × Curtiss V-1400 V-12 water-cooled piston engine, 565 hp (421 kW)
- Propellers: 2-bladed fixed-pitch propeller

Performance

- Maximum speed: 245 mph (394 km/h, 213 kn)
- Range: 290 mi (470 km, 250 nmi) at full throttle

== In popular culture ==
- A Curtiss R3C appears in Hayao Miyazaki's 1992 animated movie Porco Rosso featuring a romanticized interwar aviation. The Curtiss R3C is flown by a pilot himself named Curtis. The dialogues also reference the 1925 Schneider Trophy.

== See also ==
- Curtiss CR
