= Bettis Atomic Power Laboratory =

American facility in Pittsburgh, Pennsylvania

Coordinates: 40.35737°N 79.89938°W

Bettis Atomic Power Laboratory is a U.S. Government-owned research and development facility in the Pittsburgh suburb of West Mifflin, Pennsylvania, that works exclusively on the design and development of nuclear power for the U.S. Navy. It was one of the leaders in creating the nuclear navy.

The laboratory is part of the Naval Nuclear Propulsion Program, a joint U.S Navy-Department of Energy program responsible for the research, design, construction, operation and maintenance of U.S. nuclear-powered warships.

The laboratory was founded in 1949 on the site of the former Bettis Field, named after Cyrus Bettis. It covers approximately 207 acres (0.84 km^{2}). From the Lab's founding until 1998, it was run by Westinghouse Electric Corporation. Bechtel Corporation won the contract to run the laboratory on September 19, 2008 and assumed operation on February 1, 2009, first under its subsidiary Bechtel Bettis, Inc., later under Bechtel Marine Propulsion Corporation. The contract changed hands again when Fluor Corporation, as their subsidiary Fluor Marine Propulsion, LLC won the contract to run the laboratory on July 12, 2018 and assumed operations on October 1, 2018.

The laboratory developed Oak Ridge National Laboratory's original design of the pressurized water reactor (PWR) for operational naval use, with the first prototype being the S1W reactor. Bettis further developed this prototype into the nuclear propulsion plants for the first U.S. nuclear submarines and surface ships including USS Nautilus, USS George Washington, USS Long Beach, and USS Enterprise.

Westinghouse's Nuclear Power Division adapted the PWR design for commercial use and built the first commercial nuclear power plant in the United States, the Shippingport Power Plant in the west hills of Pittsburgh.

The laboratory had two supercomputers listed on the 26th TOP500 List (November 2005). Ranked 97 a 1,090 processor Opteron system and ranked 405 a 536 processor Itanium 2 system.

The laboratory also provides support for the U.S. Navy's Reactor Engineering School. The school provides a post-graduate certificate program in nuclear engineering with a focus on nuclear reactor design, construction, and operations. It is open only to naval personnel and Bettis engineers.

The laboratory had been chosen to develop the Project Prometheus nuclear power source for the JIMO (Jupiter Icy Moons Orbiter) project, however, funding for this program was cancelled in the fall of 2005.

== Sources ==
- EPA (2005). "Bettis Atomic Power Laboratory" (PDF). Region 3 GPRA Baseline RCRA Corrective Action Facility. Archived from the original (PDF) on March 28, 2003.
- IEEE (1971). "John W. Simpson". IEEE History Center. Archived from the original on November 26, 2005.
- GlobalSecurity.org (2005). "Bettis Atomic Power Laboratory". Weapons of Mass Destruction.
- TOP500 (2005). "DOE/Bettis Atomic Power Laboratory". TOP500 Supercomputer Sites. Archived from the original on November 10, 2005.
- FAS. "Naval Reactors (NR): A Potential Model for Improved Personnel Management in the Department of Energy (DOE)".
- "Nuclear: Officer: Careers & Jobs: Navy". Navy Careers & Jobs. U.S. Navy. 2005. Archived from the original on August 28, 2005.
- "Bechtel Awarded Contracts for Bettis, Knolls Laboratories". Bechtel Corporation. 2008.
