= Allegheny County Airport Authority =

Municipal authority in Allegheny County, Pennsylvania

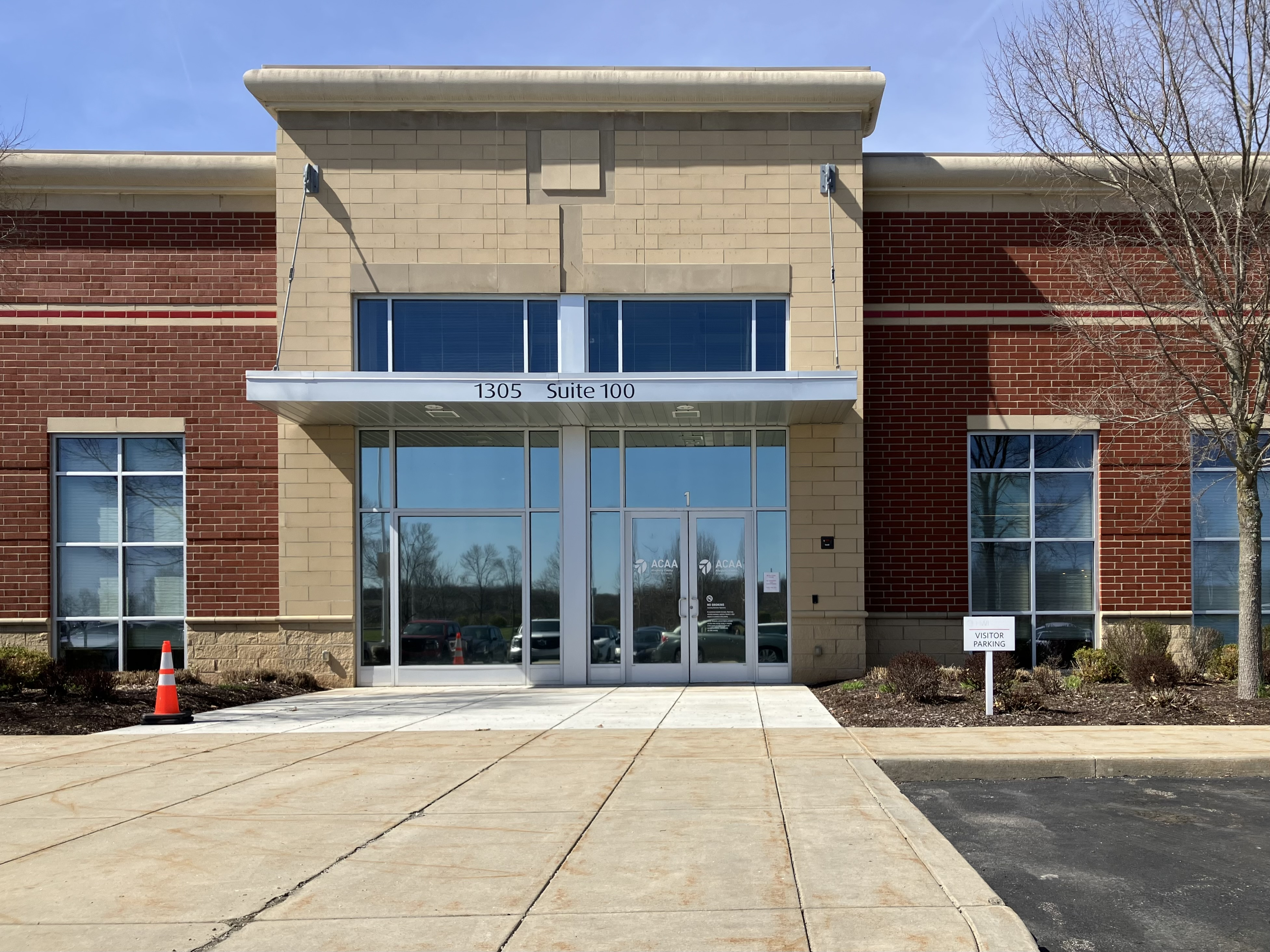

Agency overview
- Formed: 1999
- Preceding agency: Allegheny County Aviation Department
- Type: municipal authority
- Jurisdiction: Allegheny County, Pennsylvania, U.S.
- Headquarters: Landside Terminal; 4th Floor Mezzanine; P.O. Box 12370; Pittsburgh, Pennsylvania, 15231
- Agency executive: Christina Cassotis, Board Chairperson

Allegheny County Airport Authority is a municipal authority in Allegheny County, Pennsylvania, United States, that oversees and maintains the Allegheny County airport system. These include management of Pittsburgh International Airport as well as Allegheny County Airport. The authority is also a key lobbying and public interest agency often representing the local aviation industry and related industry interests in Harrisburg (the state capital) and on the federal level.

== Directors of Pittsburgh International Airport ==
- Christina Cassotis January 15, 2015–present
- James R. Gill March 14, 2014–January 14, 2015 (interim)
- Bradley Penrod October 2007–February 5, 2013 (interim status until March 14, 2014)
- Kent George December 14, 1998–October 2007 (also served as president of the American Association of Airport Executives
- Gary Bishop January 1996–December 31, 1997
- Peter Florian January 20, 1996–
- Herbert Higginbotham December 1993– January 19, 1996
- Guy Tumolo June 1993–November 30, 1993
- Scott O'Donnell January 1988–June 1993
- Stephen A. George pre-1988
- David Donohoe circa 1981–1982
- Martin J. Griffin, 1968–1971
- Clifford Ball, April 23, 1952 (opening)–October 1955.
