= TWA Flight 15A =

1937 aviation accident

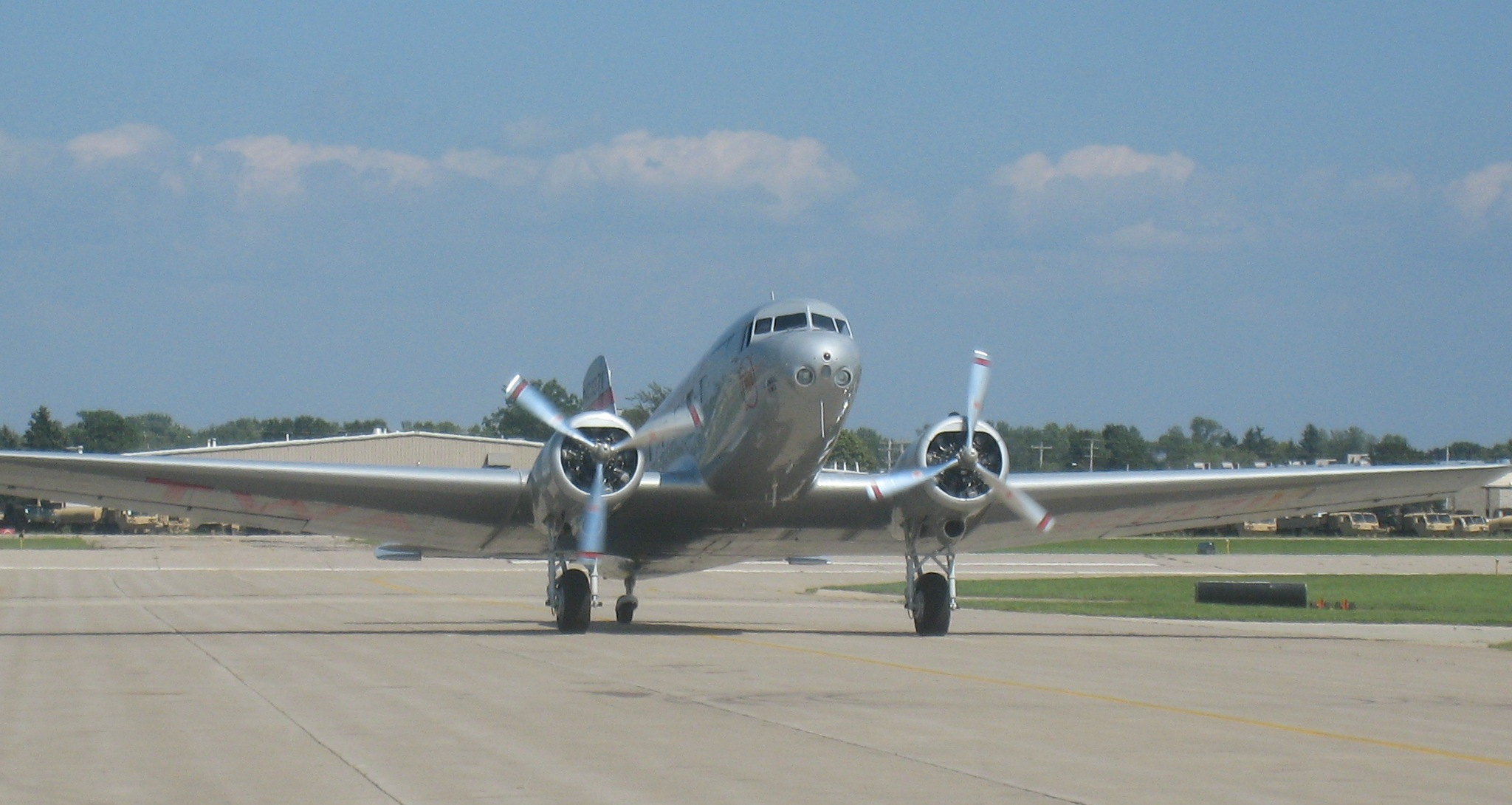
- A restored DC-2 is seen with TWA markings

Accident
- Date: March 25, 1937
- Summary: Icing, loss of control
- Site: Upper St. Clair Township, Pennsylvania, near Pittsburgh, Pennsylvania; 40°19′48″N 80°04′02″W

Aircraft
- Aircraft type: Douglas DC-2
- Operator: Transcontinental and Western Air (TWA)
- Registration: NC-13730
- Flight origin: Camden, New Jersey
- Destination: Pittsburgh, Pennsylvania
- Passengers: 10
- Crew: 3
- Fatalities: 13
- Survivors: 0

TWA Flight 15A (TWA 15A), a Douglas DC-2 operated by Transcontinental and Western Air, crashed into a gully in Clifton, Pennsylvania, now Upper Saint Clair, a suburb approximately 7 miles (11 km) south of Pittsburgh. The crash occurred at approximately 6:40 p.m. Eastern Standard Time on March 25, 1937, killing all 13 passengers and crew members. Flight 15A was a regularly scheduled flight from Newark, New Jersey to Pittsburgh, Pennsylvania via Camden, New Jersey.

This accident marked the third fatal crash of a commercial airliner in the Pittsburgh area within a single year's time. On April 7, 1936 TWA Flight 1, also a DC-2, crashed into Cheat Mountain south-east of Pittsburgh near Uniontown with 12 fatalities. On September 5, 1936 a Stinson 6000 tri-motor operating under the name Skyways crashed near Pittsburgh's Allegheny County airport while on a sightseeing flight, killing 10 of 11 onboard.

== The crash ==
Because of weather concerns, Flight 15A was loaded with extra fuel prior to departure from Camden. This fuel would allow the plane to continue to Columbus, Ohio in case the weather conditions in Pittsburgh prevented landing there. The weight of the extra fuel resulted in some scheduled passengers to be denied boarding.

Despite the weather conditions, Flight 15A proceeded normally. Following normal protocol it followed the radio beacon to the Allegheny County Airport. Contacting the control tower, Captain Larry Bohnett was advised to continue west and reduce altitude before turning back for a final approach. This was the last communication with the aircraft.

Another TWA plane, Flight 6 from Columbus, was approaching the Allegheny County Airport at an altitude of 2000 feet. The pilot of this flight, A.M. Wilkins, spotted Flight 15A dead ahead in level flight at a slightly lower altitude. Captain Wilkins observed that Flight 15A appeared to initiate a left turn but instead began a series of leftward spirals before crashing into the ground nose first. Captain Wilkins turned his plane in order to prevent his passengers from seeing the wreckage and notified the airport officials of what he witnessed.

== Investigation ==
Due to the location of the crash a number of witnesses were in the vicinity and were able to quickly respond to the accident. These witnesses reported finding a heavily damaged aircraft and no survivors. The bodies of the victims were severely traumatized, indicating that the plane struck the ground with a high level of force. A number of the initial responders noted a layer of ice on the control surfaces of the DC-2. Despite the presence of fuel no fire occurred.

An initial inquiry was held in Pittsburgh by the Bureau of Air Commerce. In addition to the testimony of Captain Wilkins, other pilots related their experience with ice accumulation on their planes upon approach to Allegheny County Airport on the evening of the fatal crash. A number of witnesses also reported observing ice on the wings and ailerons of the wreckage of Flight 15A.
