= Pennsylvania Central Airlines Flight 105 =

1946 aviation accident

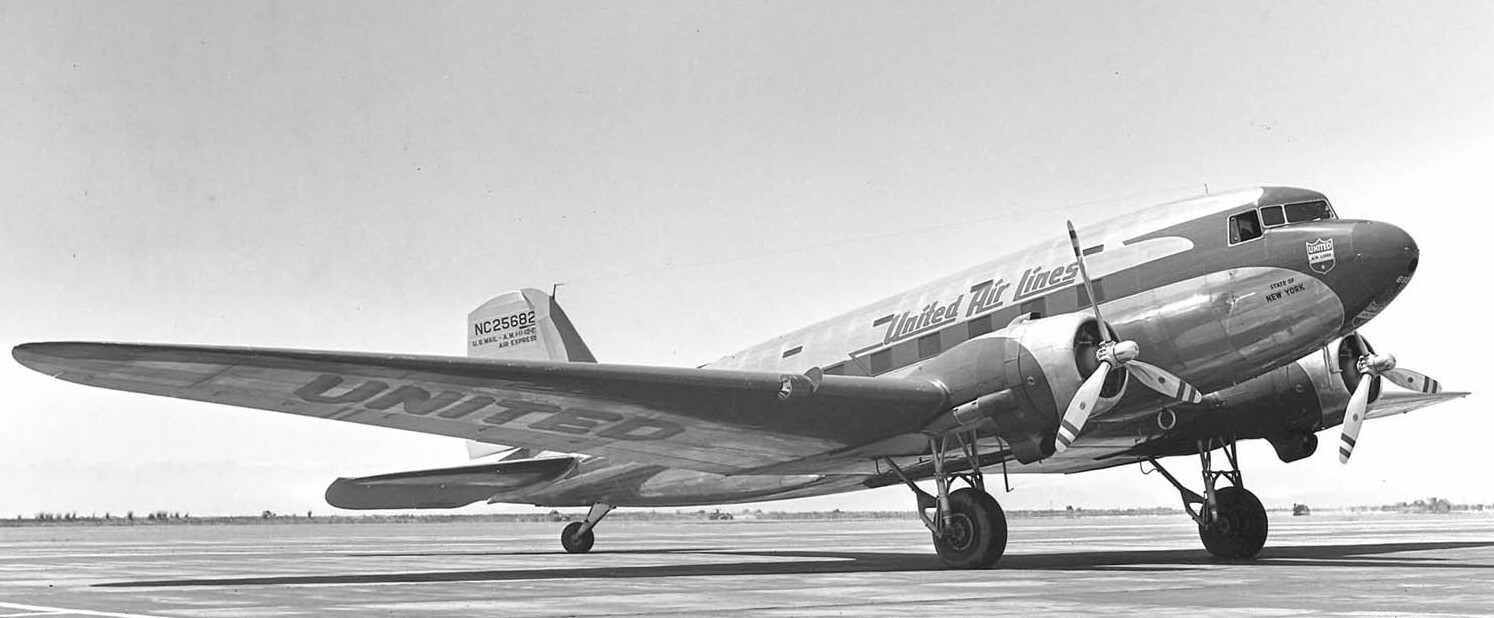
- A similar DC-3

Accident
- Date: January 6, 1946
- Summary: Controlled Flight Into Terrain
- Site: Birmingham Municipal Airport, Birmingham, Alabama, United States; 33°33′34″N 86°44′50″W

Aircraft
- Aircraft type: Douglas DC-3-393
- Operator: Pennsylvania Central Airlines
- Registration: NC21786
- Flight origin: LaGuardia Field, New York City, New York
- Destination: Birmingham Municipal Airport, Birmingham, Alabama
- Occupants: 19
- Passengers: 15
- Crew: 4
- Fatalities: 3
- Injuries: 5
- Survivors: 16

Pennsylvania Central Airlines Flight 105 was a regularly scheduled commercial flight between New York City and Birmingham, Alabama which crashed in the pre-dawn hours of January 6, 1946 while landing at Birmingham Municipal Airport, resulting in three fatalities.

== History of flight ==
On Sunday, January 6, 1946, a Pennsylvania Central Airlines Douglas DC-3 (registration NC21786), flying as Flight 105 originating in New York City with stops in Pittsburgh, Pennsylvania and Knoxville, Tennessee, crashed while attempting to make an instrument approach to Runway 18 at Birmingham Municipal Airport (now Birmingham–Shuttlesworth International Airport) in Birmingham, Alabama. The plane crashed into Village Creek at the south end of runway 18–36. The captain, first officer, and a check airman who occupied the cockpit jump seat perished in the crash; several passengers were injured, none fatally.

The regularly scheduled flight departed New York City's LaGuardia Field at 7:00 p.m. Eastern time on January 5. After battling abnormally high headwinds, the flight made routine stops in Pittsburgh and Knoxville. While in Knoxville, the captain was briefed on the latest weather in Birmingham and elected to continue the flight. The flight left Knoxville at 2:51 a.m. Eastern time. Considerable turbulence was experienced between Knoxville and Birmingham due to active thunderstorms throughout the South.

The flight, which was scheduled to arrive at 12:52 a.m. Central Time, was cleared for a straight-in approach from the north by the Birmingham tower at 3:48 a.m.. At 3:51 a.m., Flight 105 notified the tower it was performing a normal arrival pattern landing rather than a straight-in approach. The last radio contact from the plane was received at 3:54 a.m.

Tower personnel observed the flight approach Runway 18 from the north in a shallow descent that visibly steepened near the approach end of the runway. The flight continued airborne just above the runway until the intersection of Runway 18 with the east–west runway (now removed) where it touched down with only 1,500 feet (457 m) of runway remaining. As it became obvious that the flight was going to continue off the runway, tower personnel notified rescuers who immediately responded to Runway 18.

After turning off the runway to the left and attempting a ground loop, the aircraft continued into Village Creek. The right wheel dropped off the 12-foot (3.7-m)-high bank first, allowing the right wing to strike rocks on the bank. The DC-3 then spun to the right and struck the south bank of the 35-foot (10.7-m)-wide creek. Village Creek was swollen from the rain which had plagued the Southern United States in the days of and before the accident, with widespread flooding and deaths due to a severe weather outbreak in neighboring Mississippi the day of the accident. The plane came to rest nose-down with the passenger area suspended over the waters of the creek. Though the cockpit was crushed, the passenger cabin was largely undamaged and no fire resulted. Rescue personnel alerted by the tower immediately worked to evacuate passengers and rescue the three critically injured pilots in the cockpit.

Most of the passengers were from various cities in central Alabama, with one passenger each from New Orleans, Louisiana; Biloxi, Mississippi; Atlanta, Georgia; and Brentwood, Pennsylvania.

== Media ==
An article, photograph of the wrecked airplane, and photograph of flight attendant Miss Betty Proctor appeared at the top of the front page of the Birmingham News the day after the crash. The photo depicts the DC-3 nose down in Village Creek with extensive damage to the right wing. Media attention of the crash quickly faded with the only immediate follow-up coverage being a note that the investigation was continuing in the January 8 edition of the paper in conjunction with a lengthier article regarding an altercation that occurred at the crash site.

Significant media attention was given to an altercation between two photographers from the Birmingham News and three PCA employees who threatened the newspapermen in an attempt to prevent photographs from being taken of the crash scene. The newspaper criticized the Birmingham Police Department for not intervening and protecting the newspapermen during their efforts to report on the crash. PCA officials expressed regret over the incident and the Commissioner of Public Safety announced an investigation would be conducted into the officers’ conduct. One PCA mechanic was later arrested.

== Investigation ==
One official from PCA and two from the Civil Aeronautics Board office in Atlanta responded to the site to investigate the accident the same day as the crash. The CAB held public hearings in Birmingham on January 15 and 16, 1946.

== CAB findings ==
On June 17, 1946, the Civil Aeronautics Board found the probable cause to be "the action of the pilot in committing himself to a landing from an approach which was too high and too fast."

The CAB held public hearings in Birmingham on January 15 and 16, 1946. Finding arrived at by the CAB focused on the poor weather that the flight experienced over a long duration, marginal weather conditions at the time of landing in Birmingham, and the possibility of mental and physical fatigue due to the late evening/early morning time of the flight, continued adverse weather, and long length of the flight.

== Victims ==
The pilot, first officer, and a check airman who occupied the cockpit jump seat perished in the crash; several passengers were injured, none fatally.

The first officer and check airman died the evening of the crash at Norwood Hospital in Birmingham; the captain shortly after. One passenger was paralyzed by his injuries. The flight attendant was hospitalized for shock and a possible chest injury but was widely praised for ensuring everyone was buckled just prior to landing and her efforts to administer first aid after the crash.

== Images ==
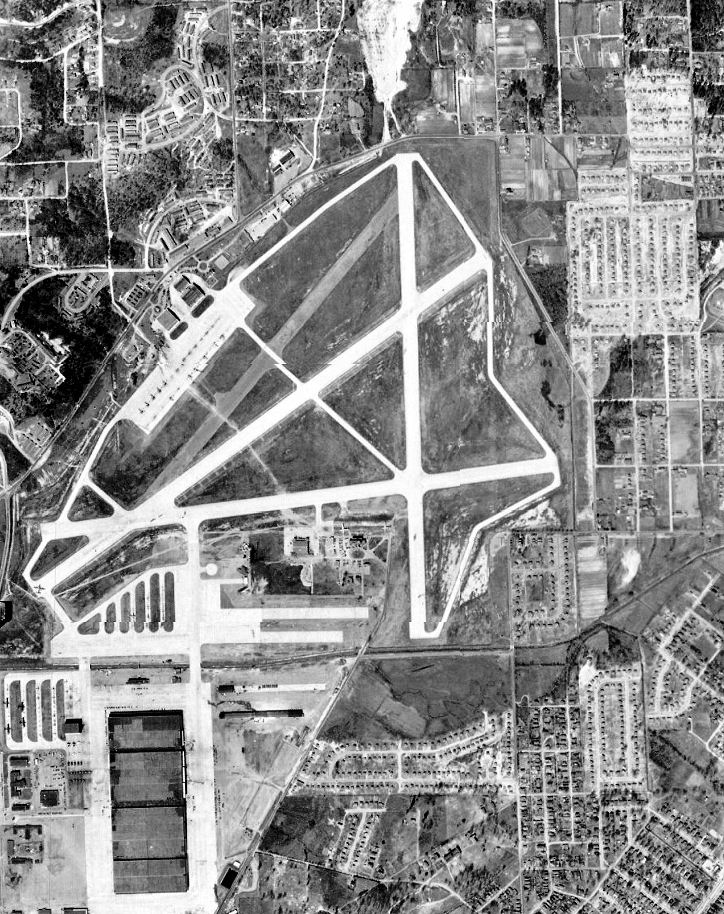
March 1951 view of airport with north-south Runway 18–36 in same configuration as at the time of the accident. Village Creek, into which the DC-3 crashed, runs west to east immediately south of Runway 18–36. Aircraft approached from the top of the photo (north) traveling south (bottom of photo).

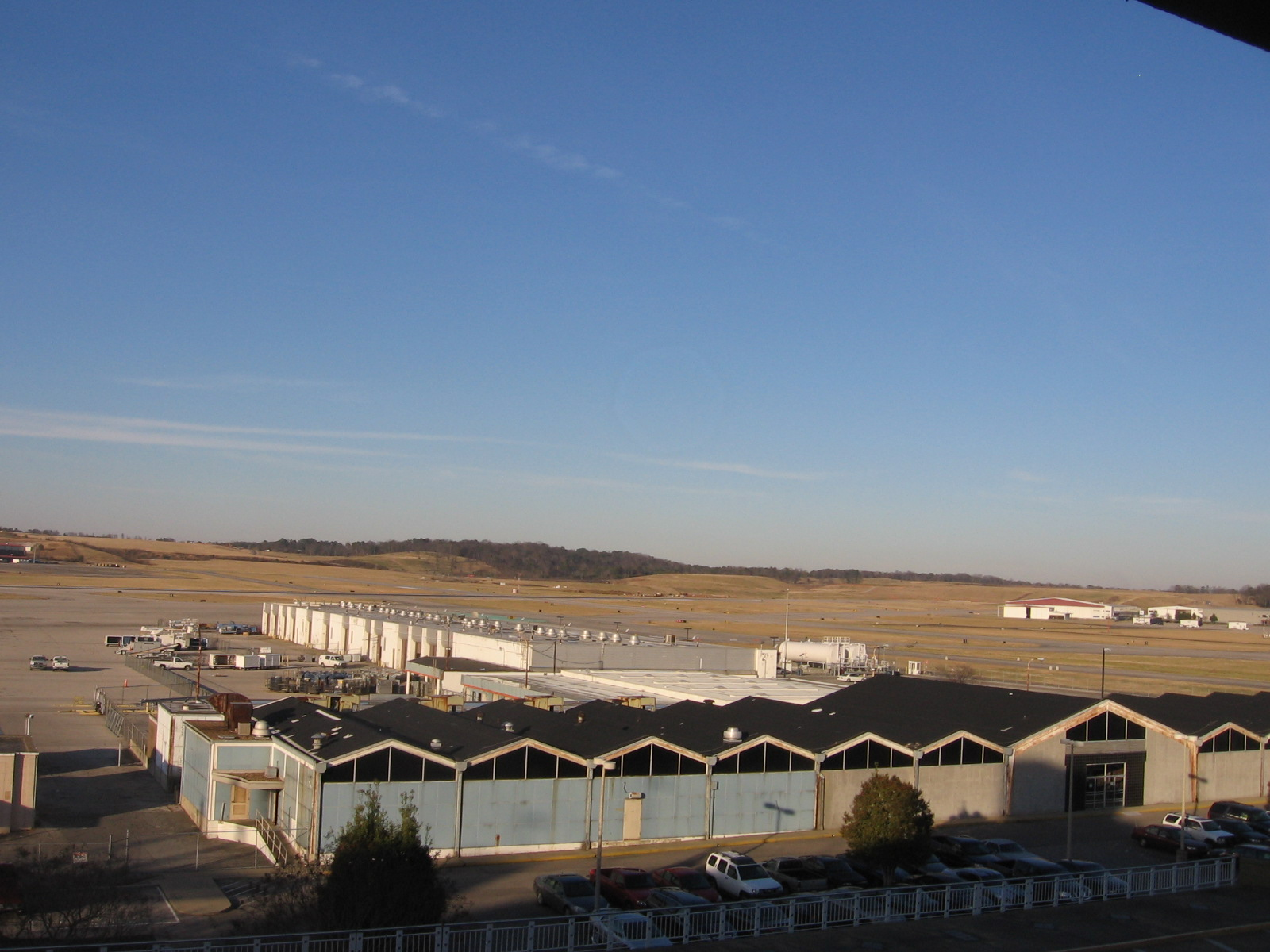
View of modern Runway 18-36 looking north from Parking Deck. Flight 105 approached Runway 18-36 from the north, overflying the present Runway 6-24 before touching down to the right of this photo.

Location of crash of Flight 105 is along runway, perpendicular to the space between the two groups of hangars, slightly to the left of the white parking deck light pole in foreground. Runway 18-36 was extended south after the accident and Village Creek routed through tunnels.
