= Pennsylvania Central Airlines Flight 410 =

1947 aviation accident

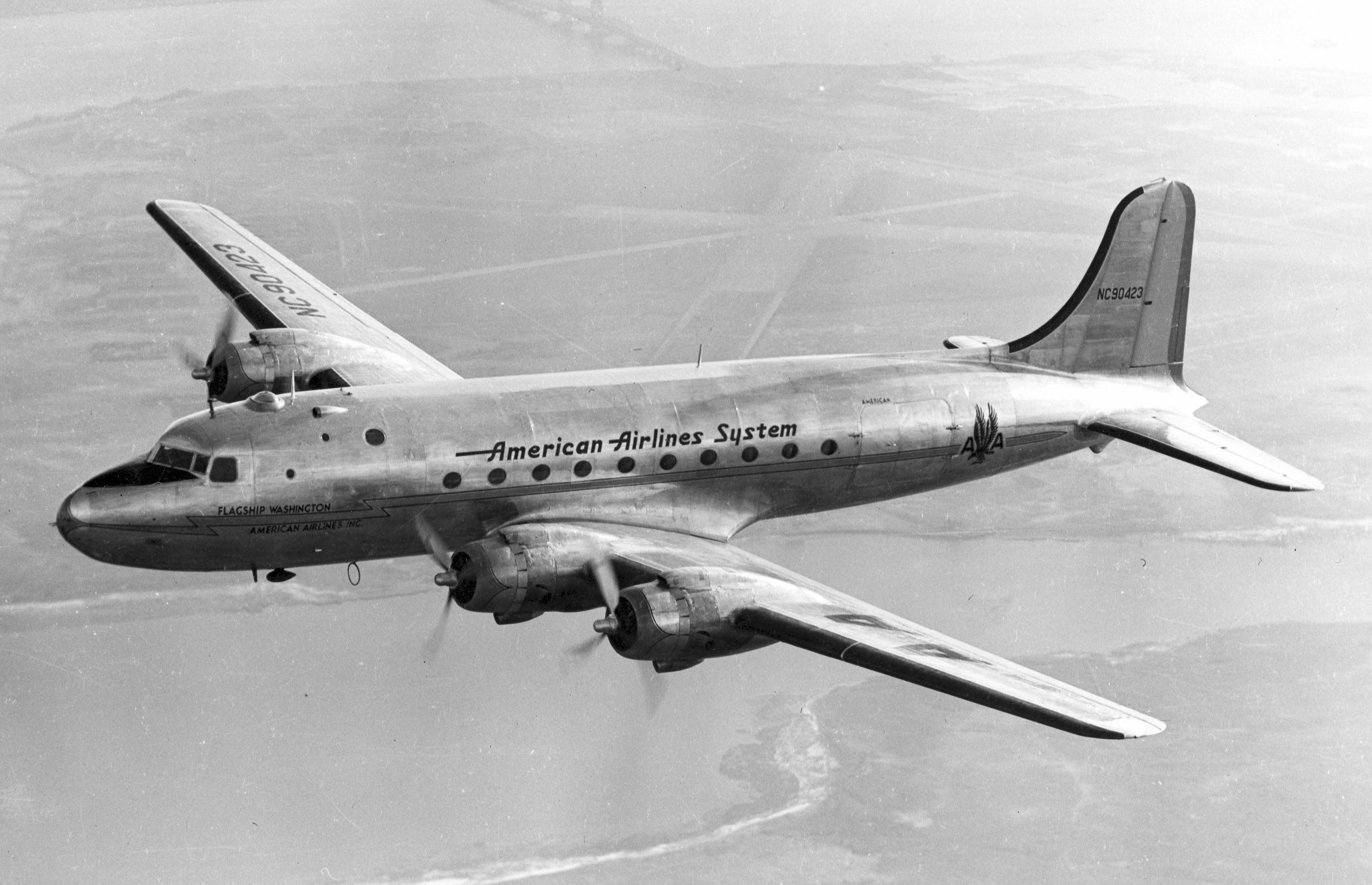
- A DC-4 similar to the aircraft

Accident
- Date: June 13, 1947
- Summary: Pilot error flying below minimum recommended altitude
- Site: Eight miles South of Charles Town, West Virginia; 39°9′17.86″N 77°49′41.64″W (approximately)

Aircraft
- Aircraft type: Douglas DC-4
- Operator: Pennsylvania Central Airlines
- Registration: NC-88842
- Flight origin: Chicago, Illinois, US
- 1st stopover: Cleveland, Ohio, US
- Last stopover: Pittsburgh, Pennsylvania, US
- Destination: Norfolk, Virginia, US
- Occupants: 50
- Passengers: 47
- Crew: 3
- Fatalities: 50
- Survivors: 0

Pennsylvania Central Airlines Flight 410 was a scheduled flight from Chicago, Illinois, to Norfolk, Virginia, with intermediate stops in Cleveland, Pittsburgh, and Washington, D.C. On June 13, 1947, the aircraft serving the flight, a Douglas DC-4, crashed into Lookout Rock in the West Virginia Blue Ridge Mountains, while en route to Washington. All 50 passengers and crew on board were killed in what was at the time the second-worst airplane accident in the history of U.S. domestic air travel.

== Crash ==
Pennsylvania Central Airlines Flight 410 departed Chicago at 13:52 for Norfolk, Virginia with scheduled stops in Cleveland, Pittsburgh, and Washington. The aircraft encountered a thunderstorm on the leg from Chicago to Cleveland; the leg from Cleveland to Pittsburgh was uneventful. Approximately 30 minutes after takeoff from Pittsburgh, the aircraft was informed of air traffic delays and deteriorating weather conditions on the approach to Washington. Flight 410 requested an alternate approach route requiring a descent from 7,000 feet to 2,500 feet. The pilot radioed in their position at 1,000-foot increments from 7,000 (at 18:05) to 3,000 feet (at 18:13). There was no further radio contact.

Flight 410 “struck a ridge in the Blue Ridge Mountains approximately two miles east of the Shenandoah River on the right hand edge of the northwest leg of the Arcola radio range at an elevation of approximately 1,425 feet.”

The Martinsburg Journal reported the next day that "local officials were alerted because the last word from the plane had been its routine report to Washington that it had passed just south of Martinsburg at an altitude of 5,000 feet with Washington only 20 minutes flying time away." The newspaper reported the wreckage was discovered by James Franklin, of Washington, a Pennsylvania Central Airlines maintenance official, "from a chartered plane which flew there and simulated what would have been normal flying practice for the airline."

== Investigation ==
=== Maintenance ===
There were no indications of mechanical issues and an absence of prior pilot complaints. Five hours prior to the crash, a problem-free turn-around inspection had been performed in Chicago.

=== Altitude ===
Flight 410 requested and received approval for an alternate approach (airway) to Washington DC. The specific route approved (Airway 61 Red) was only recently approved by the Civil Aeronautics Administration (CAA) for Pennsylvania Central Airlines (PCA), but no minimum altitude had been set. In addition, PCA had not yet established a minimum altitude.

=== Probable cause ===
The investigation concluded that the pilot had erred in descending below the minimum altitude for which the flight had received clearance without adequate ground references. In addition, contributing fault was assigned to Airway Traffic Control and the PCA dispatcher for providing an inappropriate clearance.

=== Corrective actions ===
On October 8, 1947, the CAB established minimum en-route and approach altitudes which were uniform for all US air carriers. On October 10, 1947, the CAB required the installation of “absolute terrain warning indicators” in all air carrier scheduled aircraft.
