= Allegheny County Airport =

Airport in West Mifflin, Pennsylvania, USA

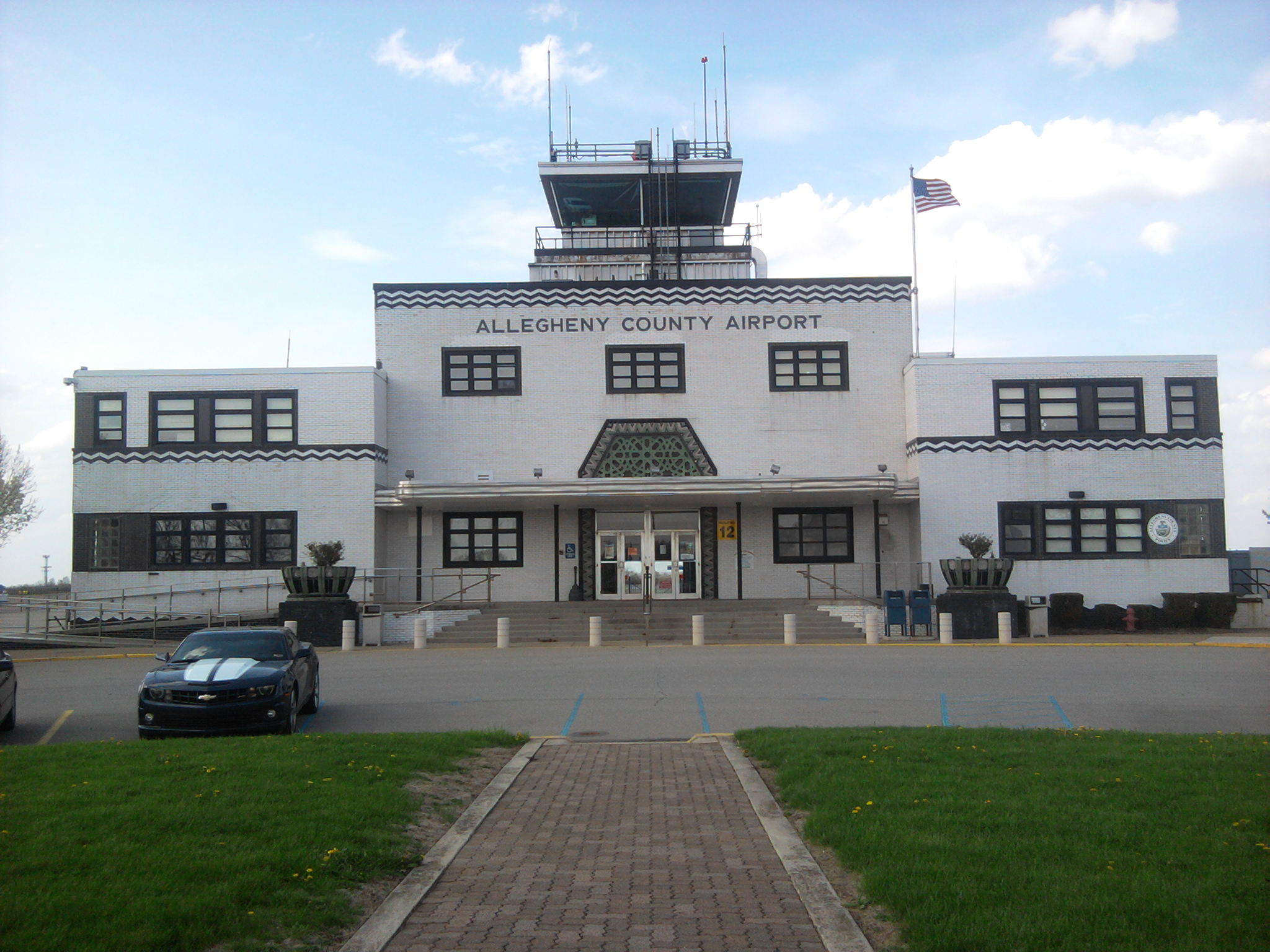
- IATA: AGC; ICAO: KAGC; FAA LID: AGC

Summary
- Airport type: Public
- Owner: Allegheny County Airport Authority
- Location: West Mifflin, Pennsylvania
- Opened: 1931; 95 years ago
- Elevation AMSL: 1,252 ft (382 m)
- Coordinates: 40°21′15″N 79°55′48″W

Maps
- FAA airport diagram
- Location of airport in Pennsylvania AGC (the United States)

Runways
Direction	Length		Surface
Direction	ft	m	Surface
10/28	6,501	1,982	Concrete
13/31	3,825	1,166	Concrete

Helipads
Number	Length		Surface
Number	ft	m	Surface
H1	47	14	Concrete

Statistics (2019)
- Aircraft operations: 58,508
- Based aircraft: 71

Allegheny County Airport (IATA: AGC, ICAO: KAGC, FAA LID: AGC) is in West Mifflin, Pennsylvania, United States, 7 miles (11 km) southeast of Pittsburgh. It is the fifth-busiest airport in Pennsylvania following Philadelphia, Pittsburgh, Allentown, and Harrisburg. The airport is owned by the Allegheny County Airport Authority and is the primary FAA-designated reliever airport for Pittsburgh International Airport. Allegheny County Airport was dedicated on September 11, 1931.

When it was completed, it was third-largest airport in the country and the only hard-surface airport in the country. It was historically the main entrance to metro Pittsburgh via air from its inception until June 1952, when the Greater Pittsburgh Airport (now Pittsburgh International Airport – KPIT) opened for commercial aviation. Like many historic municipal fields, Allegheny serves small and mid-sized private, corporate and commercial traffic well, but was not built to handle jet airliners. A Boeing 727 owned by Rockwell and two DC-9s however were based on the field for years. One DC-9, owned by Westinghouse Air Brake, operated from the former TWA hangar. Another DC-9 was owned by Richard Scaife. Additionally, political candidates often operate chartered jet airliners into the field. Air Force 2, a Boeing 757, has been on the airport many times. In May 2017, a Southwest Boeing 737 with 143 passengers en route from Orlando, made a precautionary landing when running low on fuel.

The airport is popular among business travelers, being closer to downtown than Pittsburgh International Airport. It is much closer to the densely populated South Hills, Monroeville area and Monongahela Valley.

The airport is home to Pittsburgh Institute of Aeronautics (PIA), a large aircraft maintenance school.

== Facilities ==
The main terminal was built on a former steel industry slag dump in 1931 by Stanley L. Roush, with later additions by Henry Hornbostel in 1936. Aiming for a more modern design, the building used white brick with touches of black, silver, and green. Hornbostel continued with these colors for his additions. Above the stainless-steel canopy is a semi-hexagonal doorhead. To each side is an Art Deco urn with medallions containing images of flight by both humans and animals. The 1936 renovations bricked up all windows of the field to the restaurant and by summer 1936 it had long been known for the largest amount of runway paving in the world at a combined 50 miles, as well as being one of the largest fields in the world at 108 acres. It no longer has airlines, but can accommodate aircraft up to a DC-9.

As of March 2021 extensive renovations of the terminal building are continuing. Exterior brick restoration has been completed, and a new ceramic floor has replaced vinyl tile and very modern new and relocated restrooms have been installed, along with a restored upper lobby with new lighting fixtures and artwork. The lobby floor and restrooms continue the Art Deco Zig-Zag inspiration in the use of glazed black and white ceramic tile. At present the west wing ceiling, former restaurant site, has been restored to its original ceiling height, and the entire west side of the building is being renovated for a banquet facility. The lower level once housed the Capital Airlines office. The hair salon in the former TWA ticket office will remain.

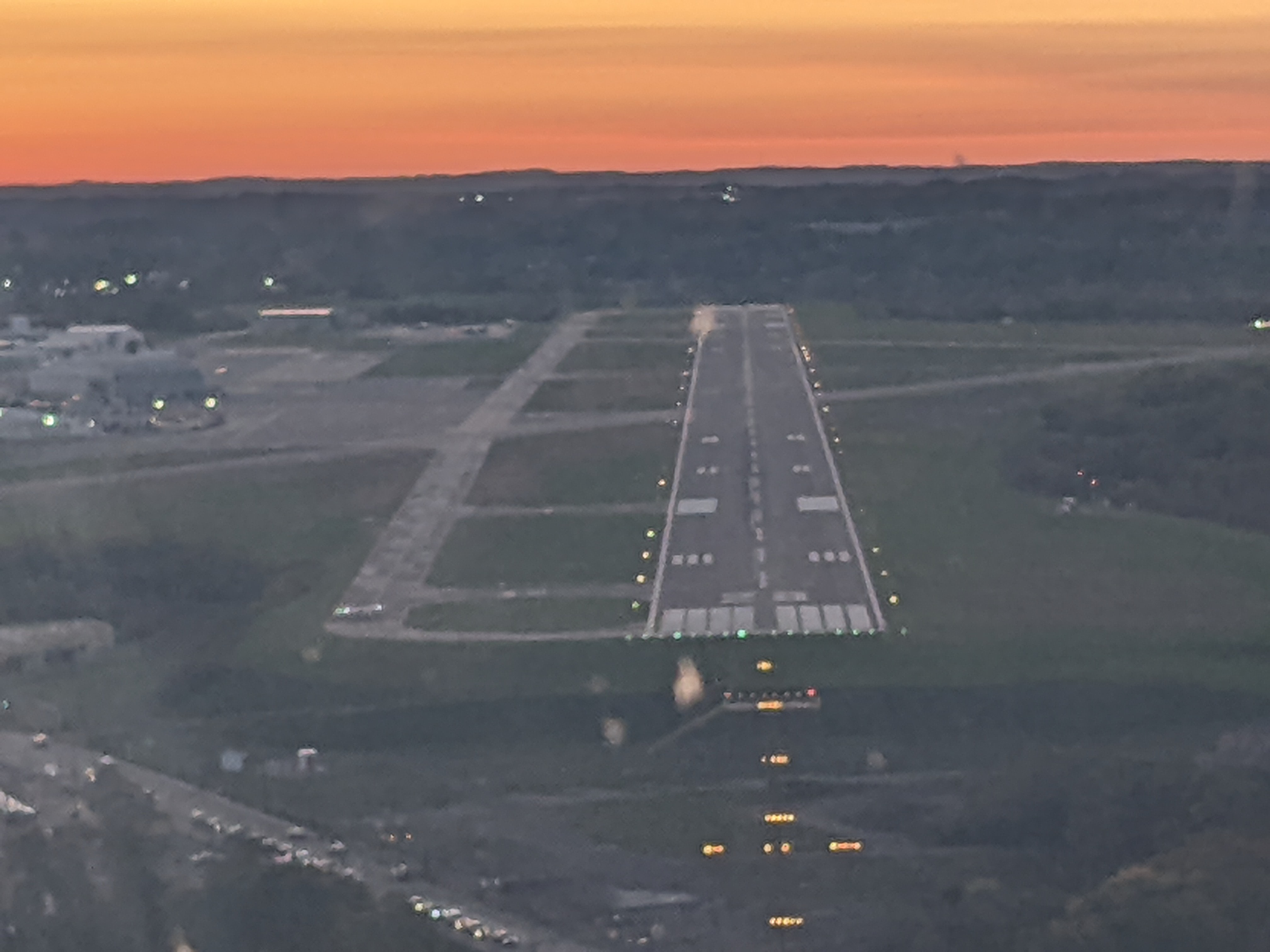
Approaching runway 28

Allegheny County Airport covers 432 acres (1.75 km^{2}) and has two active runways and one helipad:

- 10/28: 6,501 x 150 ft (1,982 x 46 m) Concrete
- 13/31: 3,825 x 100 ft (1,166 x 30 m) Concrete
- Helipad H1: 47 x 45 ft (14 x 14 m) Concrete

The closure of Runway 5/23, at 2550'x 100 was announced in 2004, due to the FAA policy of not funding runways that short and needed expansion for Voyager Jet Center. The Rwy 5 VOR approach was decommissioned at that time.

=== County Police station ===
The airport once had a police station, but it was converted to other uses when the Airport authority took police protection out of the budget. Today, there is no police security at the airport.

=== Security ===
The airport does not have a defined airport security checkpoint as most flights are private planes or company jets. Airlines provide their own security inspection, if any. The way the airport building is laid out would make a checkpoint impractical and hard to control.

=== Crash Fire Rescue ===
An ARFF (Airport Rescue and Fire Fighting) station, adjacent to the former gate 1, is staffed 24 hours a day by professional airport firefighters. It had been closed in a cost-saving move and responsibilities taken over by the local volunteer fire department. However, it was reopened after a single engine plane with a fire landed and the pilot later succumbed to his burns.

=== STAT MedEvac ===
Allegheny County Airport is home to the STAT MedEvac headquarters. Based on the East end of the airfield at the former Gate 9, the building is a former FPO with adjoining maintenance hangar. Their helicopters land on the ramp dubbed "STAT Land" to reposition from other hospitals, and to re-fuel.

=== Recent Improvements ===
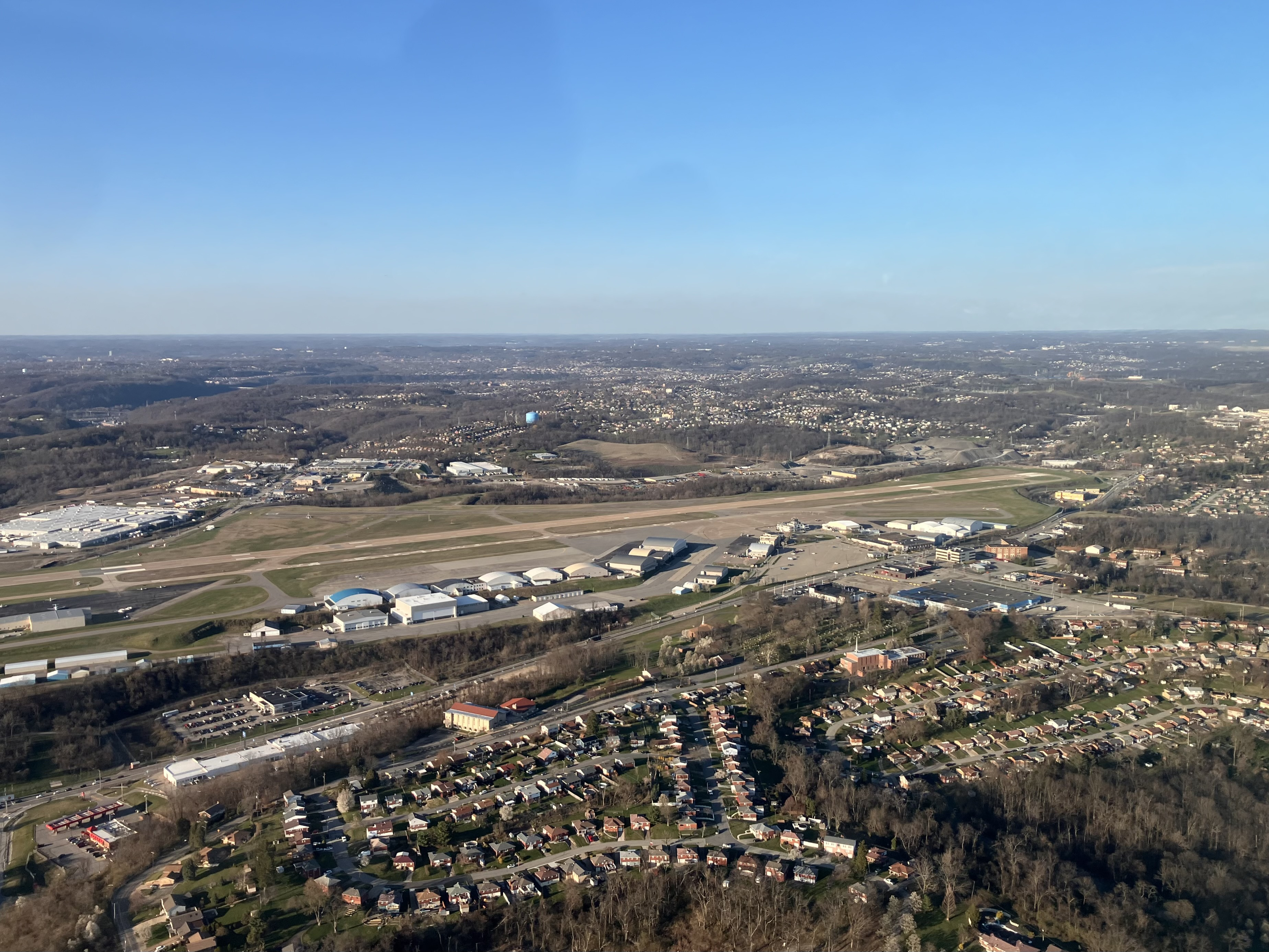
Aerial view of Allegheny County Airport at 1000 ft above the ground

A series of T-hangars were erected by the airport authority, in place of deteriorated ones. The terminal has been made ADA compliant with the addition of an elevator and other modifications. The entry road and parking lot concrete has been completely replaced, along with new lighting. Extensive masonry renovation to the terminal building is currently ongoing.

=== Future improvements ===
The Allegheny County Airport Authority has received $2 million from the federal stimulus bill for construction at the Allegheny County Airport. The money will be used to renovate four taxiways. It will also be used to reconfigure aircraft apron areas. This will allow for future construction on aircraft maintenance hangars and ramp space associated for the maintenance areas. Construction was scheduled to begin July 20, 2009. The airport expected 40 new jobs to be created with the project but says it is the gateway for more jobs when the aircraft maintenance facility construction starts. The construction will help improve the layout of the airfield.

The Mon-Fayette Expressway, now under construction from near Pittsburgh International Airport to SR51 South and SR 43 will also connect with I376 to the east with an interchange about a mile from Allegheny County Airport.

== FBOs ==
- Corporate Air, LLC
- Atlantic Aviation

== Aviation schools and Clubs ==
- Pittsburgh Flight Training Center
- Pittsburgh Institute of Aeronautics
- ABC Flying Club

== Rental car ==
- Hertz Rental Cars
- Thrifty Car Rental
- Avis Car Rental
- Enterprise Car Rental

== Incidents ==
Date	Flight/Airplane	Description
April 5, 2010	Small private plane	Caught fire while taxiing, no one injured.
January 31, 1956	U.S. Air Force: B-25 Mitchell	North American TB-25N Mitchell 44-29125, on cross country flight from Nellis AFB, Nevada to Olmsted AFB, Pennsylvania, after departing Selfridge AFB, Michigan suffers fuel starvation NE of Pittsburgh, Pennsylvania in mid-afternoon, attempts to divert to Greater Pittsburgh AFB, ditches in the Monongahela River at the 4.9-mile (7.9 km) marker, west of the Homestead High-Level Bridge, drifts ~1.5 miles (2.4 km) downstream in 8–10 knots. current, remaining afloat for 10–15 minutes. All six crew evacuate but two are lost in the 35 °F (2 °C) water before rescue. Search for sunken bomber suspended February 14 with no success – aircraft is thought to have possibly settled in submerged gravel pit area in 32 feet (9.8 m) of water, ~150 feet (46 m) from shore, possibly now covered by 10–15 feet of silt. This crash remains one of the Pittsburgh region's unsolved mysteries.
December 22, 1954	DC-3 Military Charter	
December 29, 1951	Curtiss C-46 Continental Charters Flight 4–22	
March 25, 1937	TWA Flight 15A	. A Douglas DC-2 crashed on final approach to the airport due to icing of control surfaces. All on board were killed.
April 7, 1936	TWA Flight 1	A Douglas DC-2, known as the Sun Racer, crashed near Uniontown, PA while en route to Pittsburgh. Twelve of the 14 people on board were killed.
November 16, 1935	Central Airlines	Stinson Model A crashed during takeoff due to engine failure. All three people on board survived.
January 26, 1935	TWA	Consolidated Fleetster on a mail run crashed in an adjacent slag mound shortly after an early morning takeoff, killing the pilot. Icing was determined as a cause of the crash.
May 30, 1928	Hot Air Balloon	At the National Balloon Races Championship at adjacent "Bettis Field," a balloon crashed with 100,000 spectators; both operators died.

== Historic Landmark status ==
In 1981, the Pittsburgh History and Landmarks Foundation added the Allegheny County Airport to their List of Historic Landmarks.

== In film ==
The airport was featured in the 2002 film The Mothman Prophecies, serving as a small airport in Point Pleasant, West Virginia.

The airport and terminal were also used in the 1986 movie Gung Ho starring Michael Keaton.

The 2017 film Last Flag Flying was filmed in the hangar and ramp areas.

== Notable visitors ==
Early aviators Harold Gatty and Wiley Post visited the airport as it was finishing construction both from the ground and air and commented that it was the finest airport they had encountered.

== See also ==
- History of aviation in Pittsburgh
- List of airports in Pennsylvania
