= Cyrus K. Bettis =

American army aviator

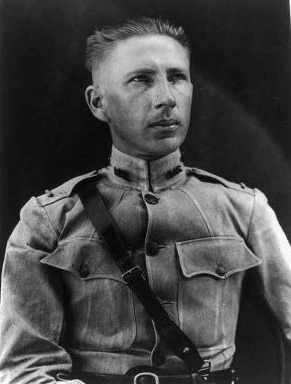
- Bettis, c. 1918
- Born: January 2, 1893; Carsonville, Michigan, U.S.
- Died: September 1, 1926 (aged 33); Walter Reed Hospital; Washington, D.C., U.S.
- Cause of death: Spinal meningitis following an aircrash
- Other name: Cy Bettis

Lieutenant Cyrus K. Bettis (January 2, 1893 – September 1, 1926) was an American army aviator who won several races and set the then airspeed record for a closed-circuit race in 1925. He died after he crashed his aircraft less than a year later.

== Biography ==
Bettis was born on January 2, 1893, in Carsonville, Michigan, to John C. Bettis and Mattie Crorey. His grandfather, David Crorey, was an Irish immigrant who founded the "Exchange State Bank" in Carsonville, Michigan. Cyrus was brought up on a farm, and after high school he worked for a telephone company. He joined the army in 1918. He was the winner of the 1924 Mitchell Trophy Race and the 1925 Mackay Trophy. He was also a winner of the Pulitzer Trophy in October 1925, flying a Curtiss R3C-1 racer. In winning the trophy, he set a new airspeed record of 248.99 mph for a closed-circuit race. The record was broken shortly after by Lieutenant Jimmy Doolittle.

On Monday, August 23, 1926, he was leading a formation of three army planes leaving the Sesquicentennial Exposition in Philadelphia heading toward Selfridge Field in Michigan when in heavy fog he hit a tree and crashed on Jacks Mountain near Bellefonte, Pennsylvania, and was missing for two days. He was seriously injured, including a broken leg, and multiple skull fractures. After waiting in vain for rescue he crawled two-and-a-half miles to a road where he was found by highway workers on Wednesday. He was admitted to Bellefonte Hospital and then airlifted to Walter Reed Hospital in Washington. Initially he was in serious but not critical condition, and expected to survive. However, he died on September 1, 1926, of spinal meningitis.

== Legacy ==
Bettis Field in Pittsburgh was named in his honor. When Westinghouse bought the site in the 1948 and closed the airfield, they named their Bettis Atomic Power Laboratory after him.
