= Bettis Field =

Coordinates: 40.357°N 79.8984°W

Bettis Field was an airstrip in West Mifflin, Pennsylvania, southeast of Pittsburgh, Pennsylvania, established in 1924. It was named for U.S. Army Air Corps Lieutenant Cyrus Bettis following his fatal accident on Jack's Mountain near Bellefonte, Pennsylvania in 1926.

== History ==
Initially a grass strip in a meadow established by local investors Barr Peat, Clifford A. Ball and Bo Phelan, it was gradually improved. Changing hands several times, it was operated by the Pittsburgh-McKeesport Airport Corporation. Curtiss-Wright sold the field to Gus Becker, who operated the Pittsburgh Institute of Aeronautics, which trained engine and aircraft mechanics in downtown Pittsburgh classrooms. During World War II PIA operated under government contracts, delivering training for the military. By 1944 the airstrip was a 2,500 feet (760 m) paved surface. Sold to Westinghouse in January 1949, the field was closed and redeveloped, becoming the Bettis Atomic Power Laboratory. The two paved runways, used for parking, and two hangars remain along with a maintenance building. The Art Deco terminal building was razed sometime in the 2000s.

There was a landing at Bettis sometime in the 1960s when a small plane landed claiming he confused it with Allegheny Co Airport, one mile (1.6 km) east, due to smoke obscuration.

== Airlines ==
- Clifford Ball Airline was a contract carrier for the U.S. Mail between Pittsburgh and Cleveland from July 1, 1925.
- CBA became Pennsylvania Airlines
- Pennsylvania Airlines was merged with Central Airlines becoming Pennsylvania Central Airlines (PCA), "The Capital Airline", eventually becoming Capital Airlines and becoming part of United Air Lines in 1961.
- Transcontinental and Western Air, TWA, stopped at Bettis Field from 1930 through 1932 as one of eleven stops made on a transcontinental airline service between Los Angeles and New York. Service was then shifted to the Allegheny County Airport.

== See also ==
- History of aviation in Pittsburgh
