= Capital Airlines (United States) =

US scheduled carrier (1936–1961) that merged into United

| IATA | ICAO | Call sign |
|---|---|---|
| CA^{(1)} | CA^{(1)} | CAPITAL |
- Founded: November 1, 1936; 90 years ago (as Pennsylvania Central Airlines)
- Commenced operations: April 21, 1948 (as Capital Airlines)
- Ceased operations: June 1, 1961; 65 years ago (merged into United Airlines)
- Hubs: Washington National Airport; Allegheny County Airport
- Fleet size: See Fleet in 1961 below
- Destinations: See Destinations in 1961 below
- Headquarters: Washington, D.C., United States

Notes
- (1) IATA, ICAO codes were the same until the 1980s

Capital Airlines was a United States trunk carrier, a scheduled airline serving the eastern, southern, southeastern, and midwestern United States. Capital's headquarters were located at Washington National Airport (now Reagan Washington National Airport) across the Potomac river from Washington, D.C., where crew training and aircraft overhauls were also accomplished. In the 1950s Capital was the fifth largest United States domestic carrier by passenger count (and sometimes by passenger-miles) after the Big Four air carriers (American, United, TWA, and Eastern).

Capital merged with United Airlines in 1961.

== History ==
=== Clifford Ball Airline ===
Clifford A. Ball, a McKeesport, Pennsylvania, automobile dealer and owner of a controlling interest in Bettis Field near Pittsburgh, won airmail contract route No. 11 on March 27, 1926. In April of the following year, The Clifford Ball Airline began operating between Pittsburgh, Pennsylvania, and Cleveland, Ohio. Clifford Ball Airlines operated from Pittsburgh's first commercial airport, Bettis Field, a former farm field which farmer Barr Peat had allowed to be used for barnstorming. The airplane which flew the first flight from Pittsburgh to Cleveland, a Waco 9 named "Miss Pittsburgh", is currently displayed at the Pittsburgh International Airport. Famed humorist and performer Will Rogers was known to be an early and regular passenger, but scheduled passenger service did not begin until April 28, 1928. The following August, Ball Airline became the first airline to serve Washington, D.C., from the west, offering its flagship "Path of the Eagle" service from Cleveland to Hoover Field across the Potomac River from Washington, D.C. A "Path of the Eagle" brochure and schedule are displayed at the Pitcairn Field Web site.

=== Pennsylvania Air Lines ===
Ball sold his interests in November 1930 to Pittsburgh Aviation Industries Corp., and the airline became Pennsylvania Air Lines (PAL). PAL was reorganized as Pennsylvania Airlines after the Air Mail scandal of the early 1930s. In 1934 Pennsylvania Airlines acquired Kohler Aviation.

=== Central Airlines ===
Central Airlines was founded in 1934 by the men who had formed Pittsburgh Airlines in 1929. Central was notable for hiring Helen Richey, the first female commercial pilot in the U.S. Central Airlines became PAL's main competitor and they engaged in ruinous rate wars with prices well below those charged for railroad seats.

The two companies merged to form Pennsylvania Central Airlines, or PCA, on November 1, 1936.

=== Pennsylvania Central Airlines ===
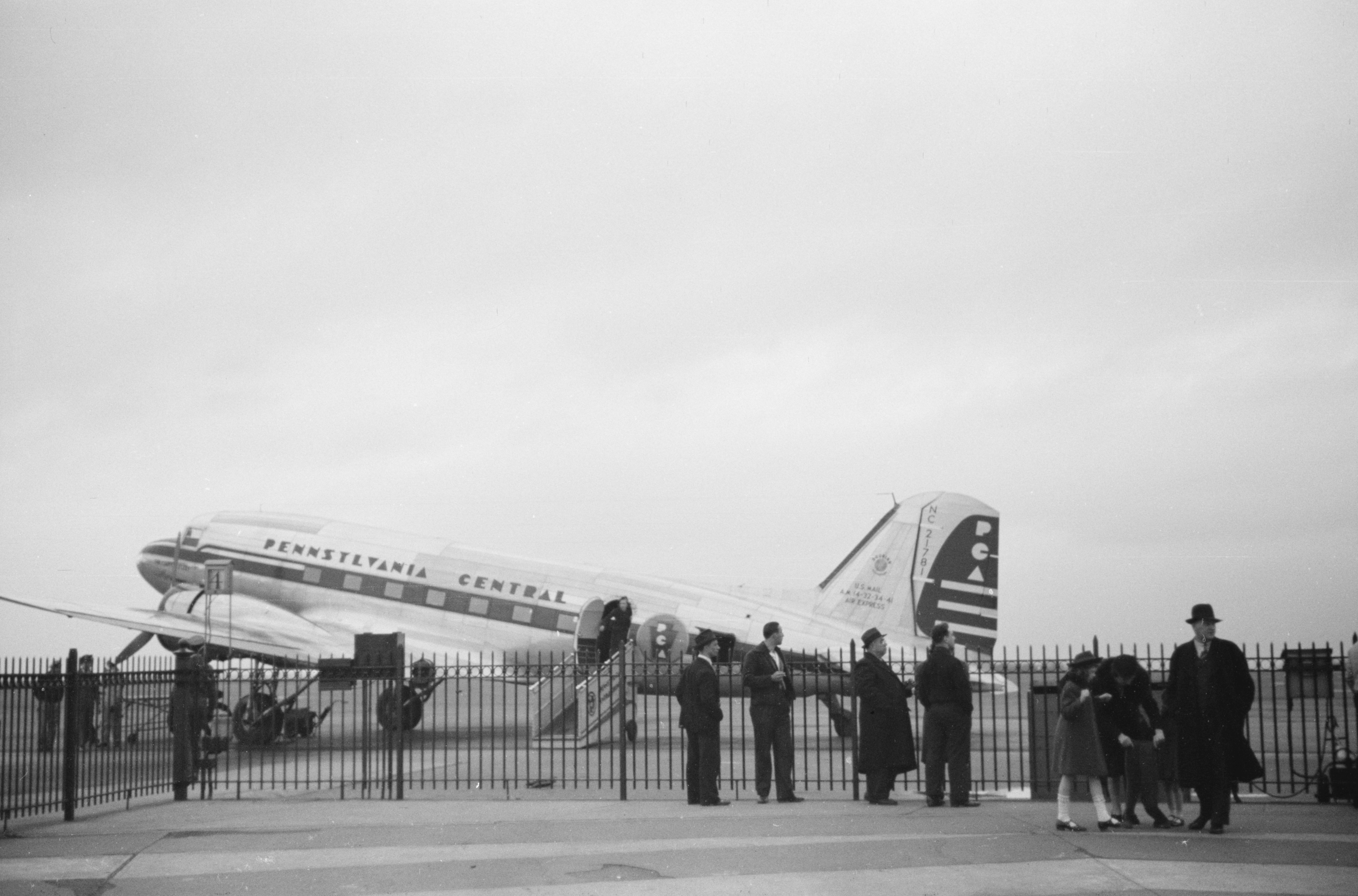
DC-3 of Pennsylvania Central Airlines

The merged airlines flew Stinson A and Boeing 247 aircraft. Early in its existence, PCA faced a minor crisis in January 1937 when the Bureau of Air Commerce temporarily grounded the airline's Boeing 247s. The six B-247s were all sold off in 1937. The airline's 15 B-247Ds were all gone by the end of 1942. Two remain in museums today—one at the National Aviation Museum at Ottawa, Ontario, Canada, and another, the City of Renton, in flying condition at the Museum of Flight, Boeing Field, Seattle, Washington.

PCA, based at the new Allegheny County Airport near Pittsburgh, continued to add routes, notably to Chicago in 1938, and aircraft, notably the Douglas DC-3, in 1940. In 1941 PCA moved its headquarters to the new Washington National Airport in Arlington, Virginia, becoming one of its three original tenants; PCA had been consulted during the airport's design. The row of office buildings next to its hangars became "mahogany row" and the airline adopted the slogan "The Capital Airline", with its aircraft dubbed "Capitaliners". In September 1943 Pennsylvania Central requested the CAB authorize new routes affecting 23 states indicating plans for a major expansion after the war. PCA even had big trans-Atlantic ambitions. PCA did see expansion as the war wound down. The company signed contracts with Douglas Aircraft for DC-4s, on September 28, 1944, worth $10 million.

In 1946 PCA began flying the Douglas DC-4 but found the airplane was unprofitable on some of its low volume short segment routes. One of PCA's DC-4s had been used to transport President Roosevelt to the Casablanca Conference during World War II Ten DC-4s still served Capital at the time of the UAL merger. All were immediately disposed of by United.

By 1946, the combination of expansion and post-war inflation were financially pressing United States airlines. PCA was facing stronger competition on the essential New York to Chicago route. By the end of the first quarter of 1947 Pennsylvania-Central was in such a bad situation that the company president had to seek S.E.C. approval for a refinancing agreement with PCA's bankers.

The crisis led PCA to the election of J.H. "Slim" Charmichael as president, and drastic cuts from 4,800 employees to 3,000. By October 1, 1947, PCA had 25 DC-3s (two cargo only) and three DC-4s. "We had a sick airline on our hands, and we had to get it out of bed, but quickly. We figured our best chance lay in leading not just following the others", Charmichael told the New York Times. The cuts were followed by the acquisition of used, but newer, equipment and the situation was saved.

By 1947 PCA's route network no longer reflected its name. On April 21, 1948, the airline adopted a new insignia, colors and the name Capital Airlines.

=== Capital Airlines ===
In 1948 Capital introduced the "Nighthawk", one of the first coach class services, to compete with the railroads between Chicago and New York City, as well as the dominant airlines on the route, United, TWA and American. Each flight left at 1 AM and stopped for ten minutes at Pittsburgh (Allegheny County). Chicago-NY fare was $29.60 plus 15% federal tax; seats on all other flights cost $44.10 plus tax.

Also in 1948 the first airborne television was installed on a Capital airplane.

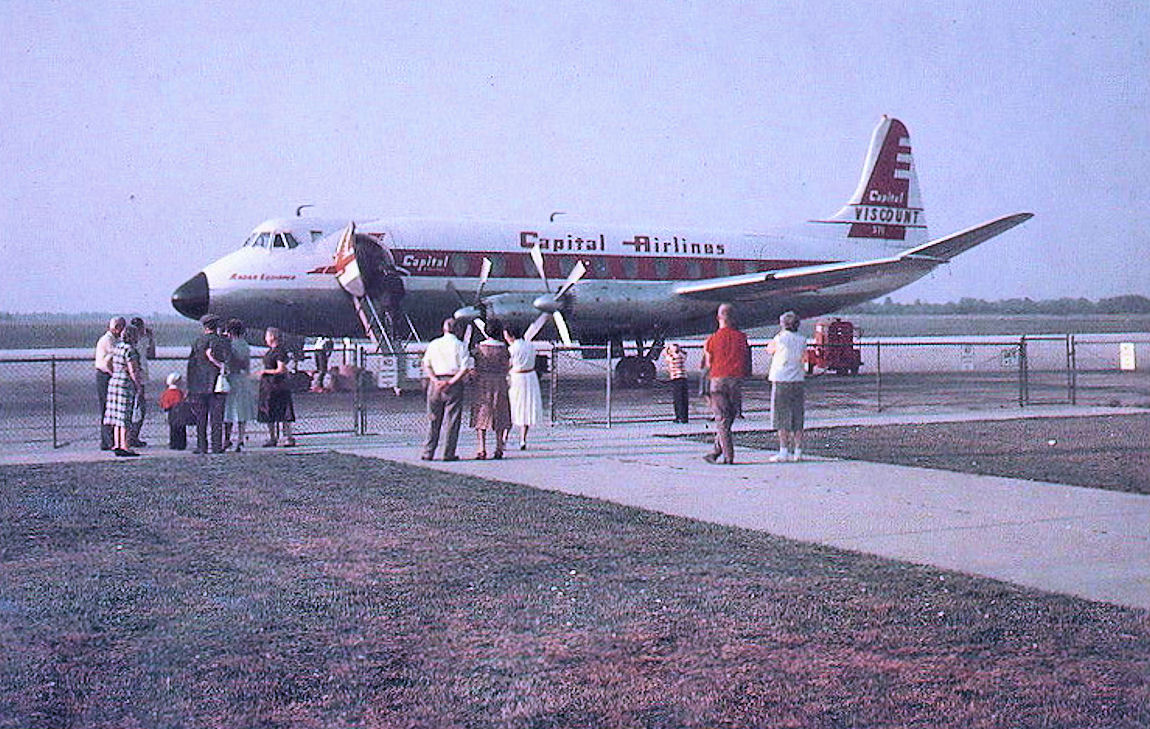
A Capital Airlines Vickers Viscount at Allentown, Pennsylvania, discharging passengers in 1960.

In 1950 Capital Airlines received its first Lockheed Constellations. In 1955 Capital became the first U.S. operator of the British manufactured, four engine Vickers Viscount, the first passenger turboprop airliner. The Viscount propjets were deployed on the flagship Washington-Chicago route and the airline had planned to fly them on expanded service; however, Capital was mostly stymied by the federal Civil Aeronautics Board (CAB). The CAB also refused Capital a requested subsidy. Still, Capital's passenger-miles in 1957 were 88% more than 1955.

In 1958, Capital was operating shuttle service with its Viscount propjets between New York and Chicago, New York and Detroit, and Chicago and Washington D.C. The cover of its April 27, 1958, system timetable proclaimed: "Now! Viscounts every sixty minutes all day long! Chicago-New York, New York-Detroit, Chicago-Washington". The next year, the airline introduced high frequency Viscount service between Chicago and Minneapolis–St. Paul with this message appearing on the cover of its August 3, 1959, system timetable: "First Jet-Powered Service Between Minneapolis–St. Paul and Chicago - 7 Jet-Prop Viscounts Each Direction Daily".

The airline encountered labor difficulties when the International Association of Machinists went on strike in fall 1958. The strike crippled operations for 38 days. On April 1, 1960, the New York State Commission Against Discrimination faulted Capital Airlines for failing to hire Patricia Banks, an African-American woman who had been denied employment as a flight attendant despite meeting all job requirements. She became one of only two Black flight attendants in the country.

By 1961 Capital had begun operating its first and only jet aircraft type: new Boeing 720 jetliners leased from United Airlines. The cover of the airline's June 1, 1961, timetable proclaimed: "New Boeing 720 Jets New York - Atlanta - New Orleans: 2 Round Trips Daily". This same timetable stated that Capital was operating "596 daily flights" and was also flying: "The Only Jets to Miami from Pittsburgh and Cleveland". However, this was not the airline's first attempt to operate jets as Capital had previously placed orders for the De Havilland Comet 4 and 4C jet aircraft models. The airline then canceled these orders after taking into consideration its declining financial standing.

=== Acquisition by and merger with United ===
In the late 1950s, Capital began to struggle financially. In May 1960, Vickers foreclosed on Capital's entire fleet of Viscounts, and bankruptcy for the airline seemed certain. However, on July 28, 1960, a merger with Chicago-based rival United Airlines was announced. The federal Civil Aeronautics Board (CAB) had to approve airline mergers. United wanted Capital Airlines' CAB-awarded routes to Florida. At the time of its acquisition by United, Capital was flying nonstop between Miami and Buffalo, Cleveland, and Pittsburgh; nonstop between Tampa and Atlanta, Cleveland, and Pittsburgh; and nonstop between Jacksonville and Atlanta. When completed on June 1, 1961, the merger of the second and fifth-largest airlines in the U.S. was the largest airline merger in history at that time. Despite a year of planning, all did not go smoothly on merger day. United continued to operate forty-one of Capital's Viscount propjets as well as three of Capital's Douglas DC-3s. United soon purchased six Viscounts which Capital had returned to Vickers. United operated three ex-PCA/Capital DC-3s for one year after the merger. United had retired its last DC-3s in the 1950s. Because of the need to operate CAB route award AM-34, it suddenly became the last major United States airline to operate the DC-3.

=== The New Capital Airlines ===
In 1981, former employees formed the Capital Airlines Association to preserve their memories of the old carrier. A retired United Airlines pilot, Milt Marshall, bought the Capital trademark and operated a charter business under the Capital name out of Waterbury-Oxford Airport in Connecticut.

In a bizarre final chapter to the brand's story, in July 2004 Capt. Marshall was transporting a passenger in a Capital Airways Piper PA-31 Navajo from Waterbury to upstate New York. The plane crashed as it made an approach in clear weather near Lake George. Both pilot and passenger were killed. Their bodies were mangled and burned in the wreckage. A pistol magazine with two missing rounds was found at the crash scene, but no gun was ever found. Many people believe that the passenger, a businessman who was facing both bankruptcy and indictment for fraud, and who had attempted to buy a large life insurance policy just prior to the flight, killed the pilot and himself, causing the crash. The bodies were so mutilated that no official cause of death was determined and the case was closed. This marked the last chapter of Capital Airlines.

== Destinations: 1937–1960 ==
In 1937, PCA's main route was from Milwaukee to Washington, D.C., with stops in Muskegon, Grand Rapids, Lansing, Detroit, Cleveland, Akron, and Pittsburgh. Spurs ran from Detroit to Pontiac and Flint, and from Pittsburgh to Parkersburg and Charleston.

By 1941, new spurs were added from Grand Rapids to Chicago, Sault Ste. Marie and Traverse City; from Pittsburgh to Erie and Buffalo; and from Charleston to Tri-Cities, Knoxville, Chattanooga, and Birmingham. New routes ran north from Washington to Baltimore, Harrisburg and Williamsport, and south to Norfolk, then across North Carolina serving Rocky Mount, Raleigh, Greensboro, Hickory, and Asheville. Pittsburgh-New York City service was added by 1946.

By 1950 the network extended south to Atlanta, Mobile, and New Orleans, and west to Minneapolis. Memphis and Huntsville were added by 1953, along with interchange service on National Airlines to Florida.

By 1960, the year before its merger with United, Capital served Florida with its own aircraft on flights to Jacksonville, Miami, St. Petersburg, Tampa, and West Palm Beach.

== Destinations in 1961 ==
The June 1, 1961, Capital Airlines system timetable listed service to the following destinations. Cities noted in bold received Boeing 720 jet flights:

- Akron, Ohio/Canton, Ohio
- **Atlanta, Georgia**
- Asheville, North Carolina
- Baltimore, Maryland
- Birmingham, Alabama
- Bristol, Virginia/Kingsport, Tennessee/Johnson City, Tennessee
- Buffalo, New York
- Charleston, West Virginia
- Charlotte, North Carolina
- Chattanooga, Tennessee
- Chicago, Illinois – Midway Airport
- Chicago, Illinois – O'Hare Airport
- **Cleveland, Ohio** (Burke Lakefront Airport)
- Detroit, Michigan (Willow Run Airport)
- Elmira, New York/Corning, New York
- Flint, Michigan
- Grand Rapids, Michigan
- Greensboro, North Carolina/High Point, North Carolina
- Harrisburg, Pennsylvania
- Huntsville, Alabama
- Jacksonville, Florida
- Knoxville, Tennessee
- Lansing, Michigan
- Memphis, Tennessee
- **Miami, Florida**
- Milwaukee, Wisconsin
- Minneapolis/St. Paul, Minnesota
- Mobile, Alabama
- Muskegon, Michigan
- Newark, New Jersey
- **New Orleans, Louisiana**
- Newport News, Virginia
- **New York City** – Idlewild Airport (now JFK Airport)
- New York City – LaGuardia Airport
- Norfolk, Virginia
- Philadelphia, Pennsylvania
- **Pittsburgh, Pennsylvania**
- Raleigh, North Carolina/Durham, North Carolina
- Richmond, Virginia
- Rochester, New York
- Saginaw, Michigan/Bay City, Michigan/Midland, Michigan
- Tampa/St. Petersburg, Florida
- Toledo, Ohio
- Washington, D.C. – National Airport (now Reagan Airport)
- West Palm Beach, Florida
- Williamsport, Pennsylvania
- Winston-Salem, North Carolina
- Youngstown, Ohio

== Former destinations in 1955 ==
Capital was serving these additional destinations in 1955 but had discontinued service to all of these smaller cities by 1961.

- Cheboygan, Michigan/Petoskey, Michigan/Pellston, Michigan/Harbor Springs, Michigan
- Clarksburg, West Virginia
- Elizabeth City, North Carolina
- Erie, Pennsylvania
- Hickory, North Carolina
- Morgantown, West Virginia
- Reading, Pennsylvania
- Rocky Mount, North Carolina
- Sault Ste. Marie, Michigan
- Traverse City, Michigan
- Wheeling, West Virginia

== Fleet in 1961 ==
The above referenced June 1, 1961, Capital timetable lists flights operated with the following aircraft:

- Boeing 720 – the only jet type operated by the airline, leased from United Airlines but flown by Capital crews.
- Douglas DC-3
- Douglas DC-4
- Douglas DC-6
- Douglas DC-6B – listed in the June 1, 1961, timetable although they had been returned to Pan American World Airways (Pan Am) in May 1961.
- Vickers Viscount – the only turboprop operated by the airline. United Airlines operated the Viscount aircraft following the acquisition of Capital by United.

Capital operated Lockheed Constellations until 1960. It also ordered Bristol Britannia turboprops in 1956, de Havilland Comet jets in 1956, Convair 880 jets in 1958, and Lockheed L-188 Electra turboprops in 1959. However, none of these aircraft were delivered to or operated by the airline.

== Accidents and incidents ==
November 16, 1935
A Central Airlines Stinson Model A (NO-15107), forced to land after taking off from Allegheny County Airport when all three engines failed at an altitude of about 50 feet. The pilot made a wheels up landing straight ahead on an unfinished portion of the runway. There were no injuries but the airplane suffered major damage. The cause was fuel contamination.

August 31, 1940
PCA Trip 19, a Douglas DC-3-313 (NC21789), departed Washington, D.C., into an intense thunderstorm. Probable cause was the disabling of the pilots by a severe lightning discharge close to the plane, which caused a sudden dive from 6,000 feet (1,800 m), killing all 25 aboard. The crash was the worst American airline accident to that date.

April 16, 1941
Pennsylvania Central Airlines Trip 143, a Boeing 247D (NC13359), en route from Charleston, West Virginia (Wertz Field), to Pittsburgh, Pennsylvania, crashed into the hills near St. Albans, West Virginia, after the right engine failed just after takeoff. One member of the crew and two passengers suffered serious injuries. One member of the crew and the other four passengers suffered minor injuries. There were no fatalities.

October 2, 1941
Pennsylvania Central Airlines Trip 142, a Douglas DC-3 (NC25691), was involved in an accident at the Municipal Airport, Morgantown, West Virginia. After touchdown the Captain allowed the airplane to roll for approximately 1,500 feet and was within 700 feet of the runway end before applying the brakes. At that time the Captain found that the brakes were not working, or had no braking action. Then the captain unlocked the tail wheel and attempted a groundloop. The groundloop did not salvage the situation and the airplane slid sideways over a 25-foot embankment. The landing gear was sheared off and the airplane came to rest on its belly. Subsequent testing showed no problems with the brakes. The probable cause "was the failure of the captain to apply the brakes in time to permit a successful take-off when they were found to be ineffective".

March 2, 16, 1942
Pennsylvania Central Airlines Trip 17, a Douglas DC-3 (NC21788), was involved in an accident while landing at Detroit City Airport, Detroit, Michigan. The airplane, approaching fast and high, landed long on a snow-covered runway and bounced repeatedly. The Captain attempted to turn so as not to hit the boundary fence. The airplane went through the fence causing major damage to the airplane. There were no injuries.

April 14, 1945
Pennsylvania Central Airlines Flight 142, a Douglas DC-3-313A (NC25692), crashed against the west slope of Cheat Mountain near Morgantown, West Virginia, due to pilot error, killing all 20 on board.

January 6, 1946
Pennsylvania Central Airlines Flight 105, a Douglas DC-3 (NC21786), originating in New York City with stops in Pittsburgh and Knoxville crashed while on an instrument approach to Runway 18 at Birmingham Municipal Airport in Birmingham, Alabama. The pilot, first officer, and a check airman who occupied the cockpit jump seat perished; several passengers were injured, none fatally.

September 12, 1946
A Pennsylvania Central Airlines Douglas DC-4 (NX91068), landed safely at Washington, D.C., following an engine fire. The crew received minor injuries and the aircraft suffered major damage.

May 8, 1947
A Capital Airlines Douglas DC-3 (NC11917), on a ferry flight from Norfolk, Virginia, to Washington, D.C., suffered a failure of the left engine. The propeller could not be feathered and there was severe vibration. Leaking oil and sparks were coming from the engine. The crew elected to make a forced landing, wheels up and flaps down. Major damage resulted.

June 13, 1947
Pennsylvania Central Airlines Flight 410, a Douglas C-54 Skymaster (NC88842), crashed into Lookout Rock, West Virginia, about eight miles southeast of Charles Town, West Virginia, while en route from Pittsburgh, Pennsylvania, to Washington, D.C., killing all 50 on board.

April 27, 1949
Capital Airlines Trip 40, a Douglas DC-3 (NC25689), made a forced landing near Frankfort Springs, Pennsylvania. There was only minor damage to the airplane and there were no injuries

August 7, 1949
Capital Airlines Flight 19, a Douglas DC-3 (NC25689), collided with a Cessna 140 near General Mitchell Field, Milwaukee, Wisconsin. The Cessna was destroyed and the occupants killed. The DC-3 lost six feet off the right wing, and a portion of the right aileron. No one aboard the airliner were injured and the airplane landed at the airport. The probable cause of the accident was the failure of the pilots in the DC-3 to observe and avoid the Cessna aircraft.

December 12, 1949
Capital Airlines Flight 500 a Douglas DC-3-313A (NC45379), stalled and crashed in the Potomac River off Washington, D.C., killing six of 23 on board.

February 20, 1956
Capital Airlines Flight 141, a Vickers Viscount 744 (N7404, Fin #327), was badly damaged at Chicago Midway International Airport after a hard landing due to a malfunction of the propeller control switches; all 42 on board survived. Despite this, the aircraft was remanufactured as c/n 301 and entered service with Trans-Canada Air Lines in May 1957.

June 22, 1957
A Capital Airlines Douglas C-47 (N88835), which was on a training flight, crashed near Clarksburg, Maryland. The aircraft was destroyed and the crew were all killed. The probable cause was loss of airspeed while executing maneuvers, resulting in a stall followed by a spin.

April 6, 1958
Capital Airlines Flight 67, a Vickers Viscount 745D (N7437, Fin #356), lost control and crashed on approach to Saginaw, Michigan, resulting in 47 fatalities. The crash was attributed to ice on the horizontal stabilizer.

May 20, 1958
Capital Airlines Flight 300, a Vickers Viscount 745D (N7410, Fin #329), collided with Air National Guard Lockheed T-33 53-5966, killing all eleven on board when the Viscount crashed at Brunswick, Maryland, as was one of the two crew members of the T-33.

June 4, 1958
Capital Airlines Flight 3, a Douglas C-53B (N49553, Fin #233), crashed at Martinsburg Airport, Martinsburg, West Virginia. A trainee stalled the aircraft on takeoff, the instructor failed to monitor the situation and airplane crashed off the end of the runway.

May 12, 1959
Capital Airlines Flight 983, a Lockheed L-049E Constellation (N2735A), was intentionally ground looped by the pilot, after a landing on a short, wet runway at Charleston, West Virginia. It caught fire as it skidded and slid down a steep embankment, killing two of 44 on board.

May 12, 1959
Capital Airlines Flight 75, a Vickers Viscount 745D (N7463), broke up in mid-air after encountering thunderstorms. The aircraft crashed at Chase, Maryland, killing all 31 people on board.

August 26, 1959
A Capital Airlines Douglas DC-3 (N44993), crashed on landing at Charleston, West Virginia. The pilot lost control and the airplane swerved off the runway and plunged down an embankment. The probable cause of the accident was loss of control following a poorly executed landing.

January 18, 1960
Capital Airlines Flight 20, a Vickers Viscount 745D (N7462, Fin #380), crashed at Holdcroft, Virginia, after losing power from at first two, then all four engines (although one engine was restarted). All 50 people on board were killed.

== See also ==
- List of defunct airlines of the United States
- Miss Pittsburgh – preserved historic aircraft flown by Clifford Ball

== Sources ==
- Charles Baptie "Capital Airlines a Nostalgic Flight into the Past" Charles Baptie Studio, Annandale, Virginia, 1984, L.O.C Number 84-070588
- Airline History: Capital Airlines (archive.org copy)
- Lloyd, Kristin B. "Flying the Capital Way, Part I" (PDF), Historic Alexandria Quarterly, Winter 1997
- Lloyd, Kristin B. "Flying the Capital Way, Part II" (PDF), Historic Alexandria Quarterly, Spring 1998
