= Pittsburgh Institute of Aeronautics =

Private trade school in West Mifflin, Pennsylvania, US

- Type: Private trade school
- Established: 1929
- President: Suzanne Markle
- Undergraduates: 465
- Location: West Mifflin, Pennsylvania, United States; 40°21′03″N 79°55′35″W
- Website: www.pia.edu

The Pittsburgh Institute of Aeronautics (PIA) is a private trade school focused on aviation-related programs with its main location in West Mifflin, Pennsylvania. The institution's headquarters is at the Allegheny County Airport and it has three branch campuses. PIA's aviation programs are accredited by the Accrediting Commission of Career Schools and Colleges.

== History ==
Pittsburgh Institute of Aeronautics was founded in 1929. PIA's short term program offerings began as PIA Truck Driving in 1995.
