= List of Trans World Airlines accidents and incidents =

This is a list of accidents and incidents involving American airlines Trans World Airlines and Transcontinental & Western Air. The airlines suffered a combined total of 106 accidents.

== As Transcontinental & Western Air ==
=== 1930s ===
March 31, 1931
Fokker F-10 NC999E crashed near Bazaar, Kansas, due to wing separation, killing all eight on board, including Notre Dame football coach Knute Rockne. The wings of the aircraft was constructed of wood laminate; over time, moisture leaking into the inside of one wing weakened the glue bonding the structure and a wing spar eventually failed, causing the wing to develop uncontrolled flutter and resultant separation.

December 19, 1931
Ford 4-AT-E Trimotor NC7119 crashed during a two-engine takeoff from Oklahoma City, killing the co-pilot; the pilot survived. The aircraft was being ferried from Tulsa to Amarillo with a stop in Oklahoma City.

March 21, 1932
Northrop Alpha 3 NC966Y crashed in the Ohio River at Steubenville, Ohio, killing the pilot and passenger. During a Columbus-Pittsburgh cargo flight, the pilot encountered poor weather with heavy snow. He decided to bail out, but the cords of his parachute became lodged in the fuselage. The aircraft entered a dive, taking him with it. The female passenger was never found.

December 14, 1932
Ford 5-AT-B Trimotor NC9650 lost control and crashed upside down on landing at English Field, Amarillo, Texas in a snowstorm, killing both pilots.

July 28, 1933
Lockheed 9A Orion NC12277, Ship #256 stalled and crashed in the Missouri River shortly after takeoff from Kansas City Airport due to engine failure, killing the pilot. The aircraft was operating a Kansas City–Wichita mail flight.

August 29, 1933
Ford 5-AT-B Trimotor NC9607 entered a dive and struck the side of Mesa Mountain (near Quay, New Mexico) in a severe rainstorm, killing all five on board. The aircraft was operating an Amarillo–Albuquerque passenger service.

May 6, 1935
Flight 6, a Douglas DC-2-112, crashed near Atlanta, Missouri, killing five of 13 on board, including New Mexico Republican Senator Bronson M. Cutting. The aircraft had been flying too low in poor visibility at night. A Bureau of Air Commerce investigation concluded that inaccurate weather forecasts as well as pilot and TWA ground personnel errors caused the crash, however in June 1936, the Copeland Committee concluded that faulty navigation aids were to blame as well as criticizing the Bureau; this would lead to the creation of the Civil Aeronautics Authority in 1938.

April 7, 1936
Flight 1, a Douglas DC-2-112, struck Cheat Mountain in poor visibility due to pilot error, killing 12 of 14 on board.

May 31, 1936
A Douglas DC-2-172, NC 14979, approaching Chicago Municipal Airport for landing, crashed half a mile east of the airfield on approach to runway 27L during strong gusts with one engine out. The Skyliner struck the cupola of a house, causing the plane to lose a wing and half-spin into an adjacent lot. The plane came to a rest with its tail against a telephone pole. Twelve of the fifteen passengers and crew sustained injuries; however, all survived.

March 25, 1937
Flight 15A, a Douglas DC-2-112, crashed in a nose dive near Clifton, Pennsylvania due to wing icing, killing all 13 on board.

March 1, 1938
Flight 8, a Douglas DC-2-112, crashed on Buena Vista Peak in Yosemite National Park, killing all nine on board. The wreckage was found three months later; the aircraft was probably blown off course in strong winds while attempting to divert to Fresno.

=== 1940s ===
January 23, 1941
Trip 6, a Douglas DC-3B-202 (NC17315), struck trees and crashed near Saint Louis Airport in bad weather due to pilot error, killing two of 14 on board. The aircraft was completing the Kansas City–St. Louis leg of a transcontinental Los Angeles to New York service.

January 16, 1942
Flight 3, a Douglas DC-3-382, struck Potosi Mountain due to a navigation error, killing all 22 on board, including movie star Carole Lombard, her mother, and 15 US Army Air Corp personnel.

January 15, 1943
Douglas C-54 Skymaster 41-32929 broke-up in mid-air for reasons unknown and crashed near Bakkie, Reynsdorp, Suriname, killing all 35 on board in the first loss as well as the first fatal crash of the DC-4/C-54. The aircraft was operating for TWA on behalf of the USAAC's Air Transport Command.

June 20, 1944
Flight 277, a Douglas C-54 Skymaster, struck Fort Mountain after the pilot became disoriented in severe weather, killing all seven on board. The aircraft was operating for TWA on behalf of USAAC's Air Transport Command.

November 4, 1944
Flight 8, a Douglas DC-3-454 (NC28310), crashed near Hanford, California following an in-flight breakup in bad weather and severe turbulence, killing all 24 on board.

December 1, 1944
Flight 18, a Douglas DC-3-209 (NC17322) crashed near Burbank, California following an unexplained, premature descent due to pilot error, killing eight of 23 on board.

== As Trans World Airlines ==
=== 1940s ===
July 11, 1946
Flight 513, operated by Lockheed L-049 Constellation Ship #557 Star of Lisbon, crashed near Reading, Pennsylvania during a training flight following an in-flight fire, killing five of six on board. Wiring in the baggage compartment arced, causing intense heat that ignited insulation and generated smoke to the point that the pilot lost control of the aircraft. All Constellations were grounded from July 12 to August 23, 1946 so that fire detection equipment could be installed.

December 28, 1946
Flight 6963, operated by Lockheed L-049 Constellation Ship #550 Cairo Skychief, crashed while on approach to Shannon Airport, killing nine of 23 on board. The altimeter had been incorrectly wired, causing false readings.

May 11, 1947
Lockheed L-049 Constellation Star of Athens (NC86508, Ship #553) crashed off Cape May Pount, Delaware Bay, New Jersey during a training flight following an unexplained loss of control, killing the four crew.

November 18, 1947
Lockheed L-049 Constellation Star of Madrid (NC86507, Ship #552) crashed at New Castle County Airport, Delaware while completing a training flight, killing the five crew. The pilot landed the aircraft short of the runway but became airborne after hitting an embankment after which it landed on the runway and skidded forward some 1300 feet. The right wing was torn off as the fuselage turned upside down. Spilled fuel ignited and the aircraft burned out.

=== 1950s ===
August 31, 1950
Flight 903, operated by Lockheed L-749A Constellation Star of Maryland, crashed near Ityai el Barud, Egypt while attempting a forced landing following a failure, fire and separation of the number three engine, killing all 55 on board. The engine failure was caused by the failure of the rear master rod bearing on the number three engine, ultimately causing the rear connecting rods to tear through the cylinder walls and crankcase and well as breaking oil lines, causing the fire.

January 12, 1955
Flight 694, operated by Martin 2-0-2A Skyliner Lancaster, collided in mid-air with a private DC-3 (N999B) over Cincinnati, Ohio, killing all 15 on board both aircraft.

February 19, 1955
Flight 260, operated by Martin 4-0-4 Skyliner Binghamton, struck the Sandia Mountains near Albuquerque, New Mexico following an unexplained course change, killing all 16 on board. The crash site is now known as TWA Canyon.

April 1, 1956
Flight 400, operated by Martin 4-0-4 Skyliner Pittsburgh, crashed on climbout from Greater Pittsburgh Airport, killing 22 of 36 on board. Just as the aircraft lifted off, the aircraft entered a sharp yaw and the co-pilot reduced power. The fire warning light for the number one engine came on, but the warning bell did not go off. The number one engine was throttled down and the co-pilot reached for the manual feathering button, but the pilot prevented him and indicated that the propeller would autofeather, but this never happened because the throttle was pulled back too far. The aircraft continue to yaw to the left until it crashed. It was revealed that the fire warning was false, caused by a failed hose clamp allowing exhaust gas to trip a overheat detector.

June 30, 1956
Flight 2, operated by Lockheed L-1049 Super Constellation Star of the Seine collided with United Air Lines Flight 718, a DC-7, over the Grand Canyon due to ATC errors, killing all 128 on board both aircraft.

June 26, 1959
Flight 891, operated by Lockheed L-1649 Starliner Star of Severn was struck by lightning and crashed near Marnate, Italy, killing all 68 on board.

November 24, 1959
Flight 595, a Lockheed L-1049H Super Constellation (N102R) crashed in Chicago while attempting to return to Midway Airport following a fire warning on the number two engine due to excessive descent caused by pilot error, killing all three crew and eight people on the ground. The aircraft was beginning a Chicago–Los Angeles cargo service.

=== 1960s ===
December 16, 1960
Flight 266, operated by Lockheed L-1049 Super Constellation Star of Sicily collided with United Air Lines Flight 826, a DC-8, over Staten Island, New York, killing all 128 on board both aircraft; another five (later six) on the ground also died. The DC-8 had been flying too fast and left the airspace assigned to it.

September 1, 1961
Flight 529, operated by Lockheed L-049 Constellation Star of Dublin, pitched up, stalled and crashed on climbout from Midway Airport, killing all 78 on board. A 5/16 inch bolt fell out of the elevator boost mechanism on climbout, causing the pitch up.

November 23, 1964
Flight 800, a Boeing 707-331, veered off the runway on takeoff from Fiumicino Airport, killing 50 of 73 on board. During takeoff, the number four engine indicated zero thrust and the thrust reverser deployment light for the number two engine came on. The crew aborted the takeoff below V1 speed some 800-900 m down the runway, but the aircraft did not slow as quickly as the crew expected and veered to the right, after which the number four engine hit a pavement roller. The thrust reverser on the number two engine was not working.

March 9, 1967
Flight 553, a Douglas DC-9-15, collided in mid-air with a private Beechcraft 55 (N6127V) near Urbana, Ohio, killing all 26 on board both aircraft.

November 6, 1967
Flight 159, a Boeing 707-131, overran the runway and crashed following an aborted takeoff at Cincinnati/Northern Kentucky International Airport, killing one of 36 on board. During the takeoff roll, the 707 passed a Delta DC-9 that was stuck in mud next to the runway and the jet blast from the DC-9 caused a compressor stall in the number four engine of the 707. The pilot thought he had hit the DC-9 and aborted the takeoff.

November 20, 1967
Flight 128, a Convair 880, struck trees and crashed while on approach to Cincinnati due to crew error, killing 70 of 82 on board.

July 26, 1969
Flight 5787, a Boeing 707-331C, lost control and crashed at Atlantic City International Airport during a training flight, killing the five crew. The crew were simulating takeoffs and landings with one engine out. During an approach, hydraulic power was lost, due to a failure in the left outboard spoiler actuator that dumped all hydraulic fluid overboard. With no power to the rudder actuator, at low speed, gear down, full flaps, and three engines, a loss of control resulted and the aircraft crashed.

=== 1970s ===
August 28, 1973
TWA Flight 742, a Boeing 707-331B, experienced severe in-flight oscillation over the Pacific Ocean; 1 critically injured passenger died two days later.
September 8, 1974
Flight 841, a Boeing 707-331B, crashed in the Ionian Sea off the Greek coast after a bomb on board exploded, killing all 88 on board.

December 1, 1974
Flight 514, a Boeing 727-231, struck Mount Weather, Virginia due to crew and ATC errors, killing all 92 on board.

=== 1980s ===
April 2, 1986
A bomb on board Flight 840, a Boeing 727-231, detonated over Argos, Greece, blowing a hole in the right side of the fuselage. Although four passengers were sucked out of the aircraft and killed, the aircraft landed safely at Athens with no other casualties.

=== 1990s ===
November 22, 1994
TWA Flight 427, a McDonnell Douglas MD-82, collided on the runway with a Cessna 441 (N441KM) at Lambert International Airport due to pilot error, killing both pilots in the Cessna; all 140 on board the MD-82 survived. The MD-82 was repaired and returned to service.

July 17, 1996
Flight 800, a Boeing 747-131, exploded in mid-air and crashed in the Atlantic Ocean off East Moriches, New York, killing all 230 on board.

== Non-fatal accidents ==
=== 1930s ===
January 27, 1931
Ford 5-AT-B Trimotor NC9647 City of Indianapolis struck an embankment after landing short at Harrisburg, Pennsylvania; no casualties.

August 19, 1931
Ford 5-AT-B Trimotor NC9554 crashed on landing at Pittsburgh in a storm, injuring five people.

February 10, 1933
Ford 5-AT-B Trimotor NC9666 crashed at Bakersfield, California following an unexplained in-flight fire; all nine on board survived.

August 3, 1935
Flight 6, a Douglas DC-2-112 (NC13722), force-landed 48 km (30 mi) east of Albuquerque, New Mexico following double engine failure; all 11 on board survived. After climbout, the pilot switched from the reserve tank of 87 octane fuel to the left main tank filled with 80 octane fuel. Both engines quit shortly after this was done. The pilot switched back to the reserve tank and attempted to start the engines, but altitude had been lost and a forced landing was performed. The fuel in the main tank had been contaminated with water that had entered the underground tank at Albuquerque following a rainstorm. Steps were taken at all airlines so that such an incident would never happen again.

May 31, 1936
Flight 9, a Douglas DC-2-172 (NC14979, Ship #330), crashed while on approach to Chicago Municipal Airport in strong winds while flying on one engine; all 15 on board survived. The left engine was shut down due to unexplained oil pressure problems. While on approach to Chicago the pilot encountered winds higher than expected; altitude was later lost and the aircraft crashed.

=== 1940s ===
April 3, 1940
Douglas DC-2-112 NC13786, Ship #324 ran off the runway while landing at Allegheny County Airport in a storm at night; all 15 on board survived.

May 17, 1940
Boeing 307B Stratoliner NC19905 force-landed 35 km (22 mi) west of Pritchett, Colorado following triple engine failure due to carburetor icing; all 19 on board survived. The aircraft was repaired and returned to service.

November 4, 1942
Douglas DC-3-209A NC18951, Ship #377 collided in mid-air with USAAF C-53 41-20116 near Kansas City, Missouri due to ATC errors; the DC-3 lost control, hit several small trees and crashed while the C-53 was able to land safely at Kansas City Municipal Airport despite a portion of the right wing missing. All on board both aircraft survived.

September 26, 1945
Flight 47, a Douglas C-49J (NC19939, Ship #343), collided in mid-air with a Boeing A75N1 biplane trainer (NC51445) near Chicago; the Boeing lost its upper right wing and fell almost vertically and crashed, killing both pilots while the DC-3 landed safely at Chicago.

=== 1940s ===
March 29, 1946
Flight 955, operated by Lockheed L-049 Constellation NC86510, Ship #554 Star of Rome, ran off the runway on landing at Washington-National Airport due to crew error; all 12 on board survived.

July 2, 1946
Flight 456, a Douglas DC-3-201F (NC28383, Ship #343), crashed at Chicago shortly after takeoff due to double engine failure caused by unexplained fuel starvation; all 21 on board survived.

October 12, 1946
Lockheed L-049 Constellation NC86512 Star of Geneva was on a positioning flight from New York to Wilmington when it overran the runway on landing at New Castle County Airport due to pilot error; all eight crew survived.

September 28, 1948
Douglas DC-4 NC43535, Ship #604 Arc de Triomphe burned out at LaGuardia Airport while a mechanic was filling the oxygen tanks; no casualties.

November 25, 1948
Flight 211, a Lockheed L-049 Constellation (NC90824, Ship #514) landed hard at Los Angeles Municipal Airport, causing the number four propeller to strike the runway. After landing, fire was seen in the area of the number four engine and brakes were applied. The aircraft came to a stop 1500 feet from where it landed and 197 feet from the edge of the runway and burned out. All 23 on board survived. The pilot was unable to see the runway due to dense fog.

March 2, 1949
Flight 924, operated by Douglas C-54B NC34537 (former 42-72349), Ship #607 The Citadel, struck a power line on landing at Gander Airport, landed, became airborne, then landed normally; all 33 on board survived. The aircraft was repaired and returned to service.

December 18, 1949
Flight 154, operated by Lockheed L-049 Constellation NC86501, Ship #501 Star of the Persian Gulf, ran off the runway at Chicago Municipal Airport due to pilot error; all 31 on board survived. The aircraft was repaired and returned to service.

=== 1950s ===
November 18, 1950
Lockheed L-049 Constellation NC86511, Ship #555 Star of Dublin ran off the runway at Long Beach Airport after the aircraft diverted there following double engine failure; all 60 on board survived. Although the aircraft was repaired and returned to service, it was written off following the crash of Flight 529 in 1961.

March 19, 1951
Flight 59, operated by Lockheed L-749A Constellation N91202, Ship #702 Star of Pennsylvania, landed wheels-up at Sky Harbor International Airport due to pilot error; all 34 on board survived. The aircraft was repaired and returned to service.

December 7, 1952
Flight 35, operated by Lockheed L-1049G Super Constellation N6904C, Ship #901 Star of the Thames, ran off the runway while landing at NAS Fallon, Nevada after the aircraft diverted there following double engine failure; all 40 on board survived. While landing, the emergency braking system was not used properly. The aircraft was repaired and returned to service.

July 12, 1955
Douglas C-47 N51167 collided in mid-air with a private Cessna 140 over Kansas City, Missouri during a training flight; the Cessna crashed, killing both pilots; both pilots on board the C-47 survived.

November 15, 1956
Martin 4-0-4 N40404 overran the runway while landing at McCarran International Airport following problems with the number two engine; all 38 on board survived. The pilot failed to slow the aircraft down during the approach.

=== 1960s ===
February 29, 1960
Lockheed L-1049G Super Constellation N7101C Star of Balmoral crashed on takeoff from Midway Airport following right side main gear collapse; all 60 on board survived.

May 29, 1964
Boeing 707-331 N761TW ran off the runway at Orly Airport following an aborted takeoff when the pilot felt a vibration; all 103 on board survived. The forward right landing gear tire had blown out. Although the aircraft was repaired and returned to service, it was written off following a bomb explosion in 1972.

September 13, 1965
Convair 880 N820TW lost control and crashed at Kansas City Downtown Municipal Airport during a training flight; all four crew survived.

December 4, 1965
Flight 42, a Boeing 707-131B, collided in mid-air with Eastern Air Lines Flight 853, a Lockheed L-1049 Super Constellation, over Carmel, New York; the Constellation crashed on Hunt Mountain, killing four of 50 on board while the 707 landed safely at New York.

January 26, 1966
Lockheed L-1049G Super Constellation N7115C Star of Chillon was written off at John F. Kennedy International Airport following nosegear collapse; the aircraft was sold to the Grater Company and was broken up in October 1967.

=== 1970s ===
April 22, 1970
Boeing 707-131 N743TW burned out while parked at Weir Cook International Airport following an electrical fire; no casualties.

November 30, 1970
Boeing 707-373C N790TW struck a Boeing 377 Stratocruiser that was being towed across the runway at Lod International Airport, killing two people on board the 377; all three crew on board the 707 survived.

March 8, 1972
Boeing 707-331 N761TW exploded while parked at McCarran International Airport after a bomb was placed on board; no casualties.

September 13, 1972
Flight 604, a Boeing 707-331C (N15712), ran off the runway on takeoff from San Francisco International Airport into San Francisco Bay and broke in two; all three crew survived. Two tires on the right side landing gear blew out, forcing the crew to abort the takeoff at high speed.

December 12, 1972
Flight 669, a Boeing 707-331C (N788TW), crashed short of the runway on landing at John F. Kennedy International Airport; all three crew on board survived. The aircraft was repaired and returned to service.

January 16, 1974
Flight 701, a Boeing 707-131B (N757TW), suffered a nosegear collapse on landing at Los Angeles International Airport; the aircraft caught fire and burned out but all 63 on board survived.

April 19, 1974
Lockheed TriStar 1 (N31007) burned out while parked at Logan International Airport following an unexplained fire; no casualties.

August 26, 1974
A fire was discovered in the rear baggage compartment of a Boeing 707 after landing at Rome. A bomb placed on board malfunctioned and started a fire instead of exploding.

November 26, 1975
Flight 37, a Lockheed L-1011 TriStar 1 (N11002) narrowly averted a mid-air collision with American Airlines Flight 182, a McDonnell Douglas DC-10-10.
December 22, 1975
Flight 841, a Boeing 707-331B (N18701), crashed short of the runway while landing at Malpensa Airport; all 125 on board survived.

November 27, 1978
Flight 505, a Douglas DC-9-15 (N1065T), lost control and crashed on takeoff from Newark International Airport due to icing; all 83 on board survived. The aircraft was repaired and returned to service.

April 4, 1979
Flight 841, a Boeing 727-31, went into a spiral dive over Saginaw, Michigan; the aircraft descended to 5000 feet in 63 seconds before the crew regained control and then made an emergency landing at Detroit; all 89 on board survived. The crew stated that the No. 7 slat extended due to a failed actuator, causing the dive, but the NTSB disputed this and concluded that the pilot had manipulated the controls himself. The aircraft was repaired and returned to service in May 1979.

=== 1980s ===
November 30, 1980
Boeing 707-131B N797TW landed at San Francisco International Airport with the nosegear up; all 133 on board survived.

August 22, 1987
Flight 756, a Boeing 767-231ER (N609TW) landed at Scott Air Force Base with the right landing gear up; all 181 on board survived. During maintenance, the No. 3 right main landing gear wheel/brake assembly had been improperly installed. The aircraft was repaired and returned to service.

August 27, 1988
Boeing 727-31 N852TW landed wheels-up at O'Hare International Airport due to landing gear problems; all 68 on board survived. A critical step had been omitted from the manual gear extension procedure checklist.

=== 1990s ===
July 30, 1992
Flight 843, a Lockheed TriStar L-1011 crashed at John F. Kennedy International Airport following an aborted takeoff due to false stick-shaker warnings; all 292 on board survived.

March 11, 1993
Flight 5591, a Douglas DC-9-31 (N978Z) lost control and crashed while performing a touch-and-go landing during a training flight due to pilot error; both pilots survived.

August 25, 1996
Flight 778, a Lockheed TriStar 100 (N31031), suffered a tailstrike on landing at John F. Kennedy International Airport due to crew errors; all 262 on board survived. The aircraft was repaired and returned to service.

September 9, 1999
Flight 600, a Douglas DC-9-31 (N993Z) landed hard at Nashville Metropolitan Airport due to pilot error; the left landing gear later separated after the landing due to crack in the outer cylinder housing; all 46 on board survived.

=== 2000s ===
August 9, 2001
Flight 519, a Boeing 717-231 (N2417F) landed at Scott Air Force Base with the nosegear up; all 76 on board survived. The nosegear extension system had been damaged following a collision with a wheel chock.

== Hijackings ==
July 4, 1968
Flight 329, a Boeing 727, was hijacked by a federal prisoner who claimed that there was a second man on board armed with a gun and dynamite (although this was later proven false); he was subdued by two U.S marshals who were escorting him. All 77 on board survived.

December 11, 1968
Flight 496, a Boeing 727, was hijacked to Cuba 20 minutes after takeoff from Nashville by one man who pulled out a gun and entered the cockpit. After landing at Havana, the hijacker and a female passenger exited the aircraft. All 39 on board survived.

June 17, 1969
Flight 154, a Boeing 707, was hijacked to Cuba by William Lee Brent. All 89 on board survived.

July 31, 1969
Flight 79, a Boeing 727, was hijacked to Cuba by a prisoner under escort; he had previously threatened a flight attendant with a razor blade. All 131 on board survived.

August 29, 1969
Flight 840, a Boeing 707-331B, was hijacked to Damascus by two members of the PFLP. All 127 on board evacuated the aircraft after which the nose section was blown up by one of the hijackers. All crew and passengers except for six Israeli passengers were released by Syrian authorities; four would be released the next day and the remaining two in December 1969 in exchange for 71 Syrian and Egyptian soldiers released by Israel. The aircraft was repaired with a new nose diverted from the Renton production line and returned to service with registration N28714.

October 31, 1969
Flight 85, a Boeing 707, was hijacked to Rome; all 47 on board survived.

December 2, 1969
Flight 54, a Boeing 707, was flying over Omaha, Nebraska when it was hijacked to Cuba; all 28 on board survived.

January 8, 1970
Flight 802, a Boeing 707 was hijacked to Beirut where the hijacker surrendered; all 20 on board survived.

June 4, 1970
Flight 486, a Boeing 727 was hijacked at Washington, DC by a man demanding a ransom; all 58 on board survived.

August 24, 1970
Flight 134, a Boeing 727 was hijacked by a man who demanded to be taken to Cuba; all 86 on board survived.

September 6, 1970
Flight 741, a Boeing 707-331B, was flying over Brussels when it was hijacked to Jordan by members of the PFLP. Hostages were released a week later and the aircraft was blown up.

September 15, 1970
A Boeing 707 was hijacked by a gun-wielding man demanding to be taken to North Korea. Thirty-five passengers were released when the aircraft landed at San Francisco. A security guard on board as a passenger drew his gun and shot and wounded the hijacker.

June 11, 1971
Flight 358, a Boeing 727, was hijacked by 23 year old Gregory White who boarded without a ticket. White then drew a gun and held it to a flight attendant's head and demanded to be flown to North Vietnam as well as demanding a machine gun and $75,000. The passengers left the aircraft while an air marshal sneaked on board, but one passenger who returned to the aircraft was shot and killed by the hijacker. Negotiations began and the aircraft was flown to New York to find a larger aircraft for travel to North Vietnam, but en route to New York, a shootout ensued with White. He was shot in the arm by an FBI agent after landing at New York and then arrested after surrendering.

July 23, 1971
A man was shot and killed at LaGuardia Airport while attempting to hijack Flight 335, a Boeing 727, after attempting to hijack a TWA Boeing 707 to Italy.

November 27, 1971
Flight 106, a Boeing 727, was hijacked by three members of Republic of New Afrika and demanded to be flown to Africa, but the crew talked them into flying to Cuba. During a refueling stop at Tampa the passengers were released and the aircraft continued to Havana.

January 29, 1972
Flight 2, a Boeing 707, was hijacked at New York by a man who demanded a ransom and release of prisoners. The aircraft was stormed and the hijacker was arrested.

September 10, 1976
Flight 355, a Boeing 727, was hijacked by five members of "Fighters for Free Croatia", a group seeking Croatian independence from Yugoslavia, and flown to Montreal and later to Gander where 35 passengers were released and finally onto Iceland with a larger TWA aircraft escorting it. The bomb on board the aircraft was revealed to be fake, but the bomb placed at Grand Central Station was real and it exploded while being dismantled, killing an NYPD officer and injuring another.

January 11, 1977
Flight 700, a Boeing 747, was hijacked by a man demanding to go to Uganda and claimed that he had a grenade. He was subdued several hours later when he became violent.

August 25, 1978
A passenger dropped a note next to a napping flight attendant on board Flight 830, a Boeing 707-300, demanding the release of several prisoners, including Rudolf Hess. After landing at Geneva all passengers deplaned and were questioned by Swiss authorities to determine the identity of the hijacker.

December 21, 1978
Flight 541, a Douglas DC-9, was hijacked by a man who demanded release of prisoners. The aircraft was stormed and the hijacker arrested.

December 5, 1981
Flight 534, a Boeing 707, was hijacked by a man who was then subdued.

October 27, 1982
A pocketknife-wielding man attempted to hijack Flight 72, a Lockheed L-1011 TriStar, at Los Angeles. He forced his way on board and tried (but failed) to get into the cockpit. He got on the intercom system and demanded that the aircraft take off, but did not give a destination. A deputy sheriff on board as a passenger had the hijacker open an emergency door, presumably to cool off the aircraft. While the hijacker looked out the door, the sheriff pushed him out of the aircraft and he fell to the ground. The hijacker was arrested and taken to a hospital for treatment of injuries he suffered when he fell and later received a 12 year prison sentence for air piracy.

June 14, 1985
Flight 847, a Boeing 727-231, was hijacked by two Shi'ite Lebanese men and diverted to Beirut where 19 passengers were released in exchange for fuel after which the aircraft flew on to Algiers where another 20 passengers were released. The aircraft flew back to Beirut where U.S Navy diver Robert Stethem was beaten and shot and dumped on the tarmac. Seven American passengers with Jewish-sounding names were held at a Shia prison in Beirut. A dozen armed men joined the hijackers after which the aircraft flew back to Algiers where another 65 passengers and all five female flight crew were released. The hijackers wanted to fly to Iran, but returned to Beirut a third time instead where the remaining hostages were released by June 30.

February 27, 1986
Flight 348, a Boeing 727, was hijacked by a female passenger. She became angry after being told to put out a cigarette before takeoff. En route to New York she threatened a crew member with a knife, but later surrendered it to a crew member and was arrested after landing in New York. The hijacker had a history of mental problems.

December 11, 1988
Flight 469, a Boeing 727, was hijacked between Florida and Puerto Rico by a man demanding to go to Cuba, but the pilot diverted to Grand Turk instead. After landing, the hijacker was tricked into believing he was in Cuba and was arrested. Although the hijacker claimed there was a bomb on board, no bomb was found.
