= Omak Airport =

Airport based in Omak, Washington

Omak Airport Omak Municipal Airport
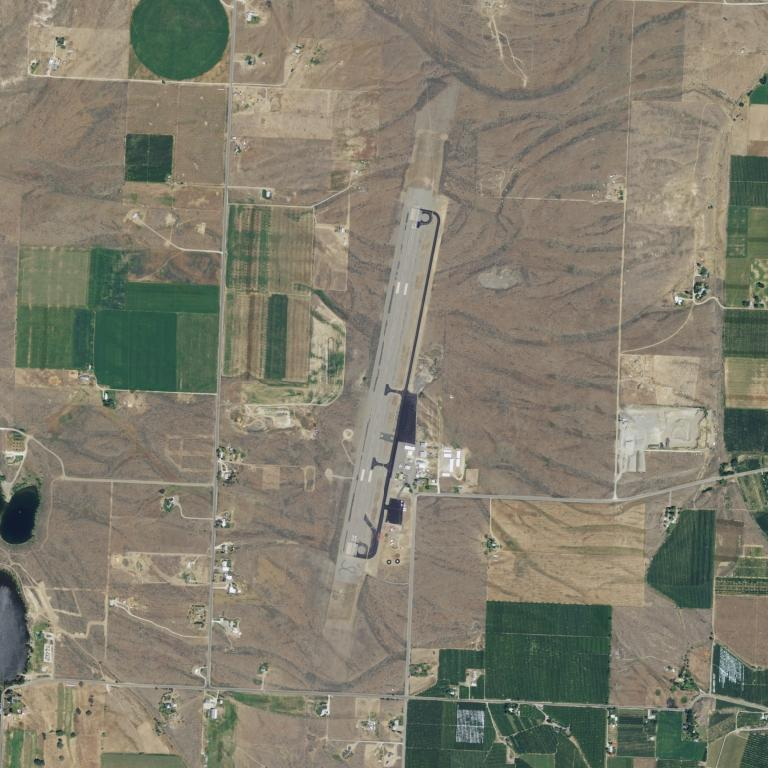
- 2006 digital orthophoto of the airport released by the United States Geological Survey (USGS)
- IATA: OMK; ICAO: KOMK; FAA LID: OMK

Summary
- Airport type: Public
- Owner/Operator: Omak City Council
- Serves: Omak, Washington, United States
- Location: Riverside, Washington, United States
- Opened: 1956
- Built: 1942
- Elevation AMSL: 1,305 ft (398 m)
- Coordinates: 48°27′51″N 119°31′05″W
- Website: www.omakcity.com

Maps
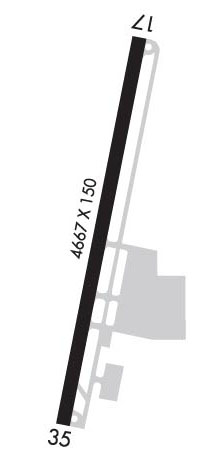
- Airport diagram created by the Federal Aviation Administration (FAA)

- Location of the airport in Washington KOMK (the United States)

Runways
Direction	Length		Surface
Direction	ft	m	Surface
17/35	4,667	1,423	Asphalt

Statistics (2001–12)
- Aircraft movements: 23,750 (2012)
- Air cargo operations: 1,000 (2001)
- Enplanement passenger boardings: 2 (2011)
- Based aircraft: 3 (2012)
- Source: Federal Aviation Administration; Coordinates from Bing Maps; Cargo from the Washington State Department of Transportation

Omak Airport (IATA: OMK, ICAO: KOMK, FAA LID: OMK), also known as Omak Municipal Airport or Omak City Airport, is a regional airport located 3 miles (4.8 km) north of Omak, Washington, a city in the Okanogan region of United States. It is owned and operated by the Omak City Council and serves Omak, although it is situated in nearby town Riverside's city limits rather. The airport was built by the United States Army Air Forces around 1942 and was approved for public use the following year. After World War II ended, it was closed and turned over for local government use by the War Assets Administration (WAA). Throughout its history, a number of improvements and expansions have occurred with its terminal, runways and taxiways, specifically in June 1979, when improvements made around that month were celebrated with an air show presentation.

Numerous airlines have previously served the airport, including Omak Airlines which had its headquarters and hub based at the terminal around 1980. Historically, it has also suffered from financial difficulties, specifically due to budget restrictions having been leased numerous times. The Federal Aviation Administration (FAA) has released demographics relating to the airport, including historical aircraft movements, based aircraft and passenger boarding statistics. According to the Washington State Department of Transportation (WSDOT), the highest number of aircraft movements it has handled annually is 142,000 and lowest is 4,254, while the most based aircraft at the Omak Airport was 658. It has seen no major accidents or incidents throughout its history.

The Omak Airport, which covers an area of 153 acres (62 ha) of city-owned property and 325 acres (132 ha) overall at an elevation of 1,305 feet (398 m), has a 4,667 by 150 feet (1,423 by 46 m) runway aligned 17–35, making it the third largest runway in Central Washington. Military aircraft are permitted for the airport. The terminal maintains a pilot lounge, as well as a medical facility, accommodation areas and administrative buildings; food and snacks are also offered. Its weather station is used to determine the local and upcoming weather of Omak and Riverside, as well as historical climate recordings. This data differs significantly from central Omak's recordings.

The airport does not support commercial flights or charge non-commercial payments, but does provide three daily charter flights or general aviation services to other destinations from Monday to Friday which are commonly used for commuter purposes. These offerings are provided by a number of charter airlines, including Ameriflight and Empire Airlines. Cargo flights are also offered to fellow airports using packages from FedEx and the United Parcel Service (UPS) by a number of airlines. For the 12-month period ending on May 30, 2012, it garnered 23,750 aircraft movements and maintained three based aircraft. The Seattle Air Route Traffic Control Center, based in Auburn, manages the traffic at the airport, in addition to all other airports in Washington.

== History ==
=== Origin ===
The United States Army Air Forces built the airport around 1942, when it was known as the Okanogan Flight Strip and Omak Flight Strip. The initial construction, which was completed in 1943, consisted of a 4,654-foot (1,419 m) long, 150-foot (46 m) wide paved runway running north and south, with graded sides and overrun areas which were 175 feet (53 m) wide. It was constructed around the Donald Dodge and Grace Bell ranches, and served as a 1 mile (1.6 km) long hard-surfaced emergency landing airfield strip primarily used by military aircraft on training flights, for which purpose it was approved by the United States Armed Forces.

By December 1943, bomber aircraft commonly used the flight strip. It was closed after World War II and turned over for local government use by the War Assets Administration (WAA) in 1954. In 1956, the airport's ownership was transferred to the Omak City Council under the condition that it be maintained properly. According to the city council, it has been expanded since then with assistance from the Federal Aviation Administration (FAA) and Washington State Department of Transportation (WSDOT).

=== Improvements ===
After being considered for upgrading in December 1956, the Omak City Council thought that the boundary lighting of what would become known as Omak Airport required improvements, and estimated that the cost would be around $16,000. By March 1957, the improvements were seen as a high priority, but all of the bids from the seven companies interested in carrying out the work exceeded the estimate. The Civil Aeronautics Administration (CAA) was notified, with the city council suggesting that the contract should be awarded to Wenatchee's Regan Electric, who bid $17,672. In addition to the lighting, 14,000 feet (4,300 m) of electric cables were to be installed, and the work was to be completed within 120 days of signing the contract. A tour sponsored by the Wenatchee Chamber of Commerce was provided to enable aviators to see the improvements being made. The work, which included an aerodrome beacon, was not completed until 1958, and a dedication program was planned for May 1958, jointly organised by two flying clubs and the city council. All of these improvements ultimately cost $18,000. The city council approved an ordinance which made an extra $1,000 available towards their share of the cost, which amounted to 48.28 percent of the total; the remaining 52 percent was paid for by the CAA.

With the state given $994,938 in 1960 for airport improvements across Washington, the Omak City Council was granted $12,172 for their Omak Airport. A radio navigation aid was proposed for the Omak Airport around 1961 by affiliated city council members because it would increase aircraft traffic according to supporters, although the FAA suggested that nearby city Brewster gain an aid for their local airport: Anderson Field. The former now maintains a navigation aid, while the latter does not. In June 1979, a terminal, air traffic controller and fuel tanks containing 10,000 US gallons (38,000 L; 8,300 imp gal) of jet fuel, 100 octanes of general aviation fuel and 6,000 octanes of fuel for older aircraft costing approximately $237,000 at the Omak Airport began to construct, having completed in August 1979; its newly paved runway was 5,000 feet (1,500 m) at that time. The terminal was dedicated to Arno Hopfer, a former city councilman who positively spoke for the airport when others considered it to be a stale project; the then-new Okanogan Valley Pilots Association, which is no longer existent, gave it an aircraft presentation on September 30, 1979.

Numerous aircraft took off after an air show celebration at the terminal, which contained a breakfast service for aircraft pilots and a dinner service later that day. Precision aircraft takeoffs and landings were also provided at the presentation, which flew around the Okanogan County, in addition to flour bombing runs which involved flour dropping onto selected targets on the ground. These services were initially announced by Bruce Burk, the then-new spokesman for the Okanogan Valley Pilots Association. Members of this organization parked their aircraft at the Omak Airport, at their permanent high-downs. According to The Spokesman-Review, these services were provided in the hopes that Omak Airport may become a commercial airport in the future. There were plans later that month by a member of the no longer existent flight school Omak Aviation which operated at the airport, to create an airline between Omak, Portland, Seattle, Spokane and Wenatchee. It served as the largest airport in the Okanogan County that supported Boeing B-17, Boeing B-26, Cessna, Douglas DC-3, and helicopter landings since historical dates; some of these aircraft were operated around the local community during World War II. The Omak Airport's taxiway and runway lighting was expanded in 1993, and 1997 with approximately $662,400 in funds the latter year. The Omak Flying Club and Norcewa Flying Club, both pilot training clubs, formerly operated at the Omak Airport around the 1960s.

Around the early 2000s, the Omak Airport was the subject of significant improvement with over $750,000 worth of funds. Its runway and taxiway was reconstructed as a priority around 2002 with about $100,000 of the funds; the runway's main width was reduced to 75 feet (23 m). While an FAA survey was also conducted in the early 2000s due to consideration for upgrades, a transponder landing system was requested for the airport in 2003, as per a city request with a contract agreement of $2,000,000 recorded by the United States Congress. That same year, a Spokane government person proposed navigational equipment being added to the Omak Airport. In 2007, the Omak City Council was granted $142,500 to improve the airfield's taxiway and parking area, some of which was provided by the FAA. This would improve its infrastructure that would ensure aircraft safety. The following year, a crack sealing concern was addressed.

=== Airlines and difficulties ===
Throughout its history, a number of airlines have served the airport. Flights have been provided since historical dates to Omak for access to the Omak Stampede using charter airlines. 30 private aircraft came to the airport from locations in Eastern Washington in 1949, for an air show presentation around the Okanogan County. Commercial airlines have also previously served the airport. West Coast Airlines offered their services at this airport from 1954 to 1960 as a trial. In July 1960, the airline provided 149 flights to other destinations. According to the then-airport manager Jim Davenport, if five more flights were provided that month, then it would have been about five flights given to other airports daily. However, as this was a trial, West Coast Airlines stated that five was the minimal amount for their services to continue. In September that year, Taquan Air also began testing their services at the Omak Airport to Wenatchee and Seattle for a period of three to six months; this did not continue after because of a consensus against it. Omak Airlines operated its services and maintained its hub and headquarters at the airport, having provided flights to destinations such as the Spokane International Airport and there was consideration then to offer flights to other airports around Washington, while its runway was also improved in 1980. Operations to Seattle or Spokane and Wenatchee were considered around 2005 by the Omak City Council in response to offered information to Harbor Air, but no further action was taken.

Aside from airline flights, Ivan Farrar built an aircraft himself around 1970 and tested it at the Omak Airport in the 1970s. No major accidents or incidents have occurred throughout its history among all aircraft operations. In October 1953, the airfield was leased to a firm for four-years under conditions as a public airport; the Omak Chamber of Commerce was told about the situation. The Omak Airport has historically suffered from financial difficulties, specifically in November 1959. In attempt to resolve the issue, city and county members met in a government conference. The flight strip gained $40,000 and $60,000 for improvements and maintenance. Despite this, it was suggested that this money depends largely upon commercial airline service among the Okanogan County and the "job is too big" for the Omak City Council. At that time, there were also budget restrictions which prevented large help for the airport. One proposal was to develop a port or airport district to operate the airfield, although snow removal in the winter by a plow machine would be a difficult task to perform. City council members of nearby city Okanogan stated that their airport, Okanogan Legion Airport, also required assistance with its snow by a plow machine. The city proposed leasing the airfield in 1965, but an action was not noted.

=== Demographics ===
Historical movements
Year	Pop.	±%
1980	10,010	—
1985	21,450	+114.3%
1990	18,875	−12.0%
1995	18,875	+0.0%
2000	18,875	+0.0%
2001	18,800	−0.4%
2005	8,000	−57.4%
2008	15,396	+92.5%
2009	15,396	+0.0%
2010	4,254	−72.4%

Historical boardings
Year	Pop.	±%
2000	64	—
2001	57	−10.9%
2002	24	−57.9%
2003	20	−16.7%
2004	31	+55.0%
2005	56	+80.6%
2006	69	+23.2%
2007	14	−79.7%
2008	25	+78.6%
2009	48	+92.0%
2010	23	−52.1%

Historical demographics for the Omak Airport have been released by the FAA. In 1980, there were 10,010 aircraft movements, 7,000 of which were used for itinerant general aviation purposes, while the count for local general aviation aircraft was 3,000 and operations for military purposes were 10. A 114.3 percent increase, approximately 21,450 aircraft operations were garnered in 1985; a total of 3,500 aircraft used its air taxi service, 15,000 were used for itinerant general aviation purposes, while 15,000 operations were provided for local general aviation purposes. In 1990, about 18,875 aircraft movements occurred, a 12 percent drop, with 3,300 aircraft movements used for air taxi purposes and 12,000 itinerant general aviation operations, in addition to 3,500 aircraft movements serving for local general aviation services and 75 serving for military use.

Approximately 17,875 aircraft movements were also garnered in 1995, 2000 and 2001, showing no sign of improvement over the previous statistics from 1990; it gained the same amount of operations under the same categories until 2005. At this time, there was a significant decrease in aircraft movements representing a drop by 57.4 percent and dropped to 8,000 in terms of actual aircraft operations. Of these, 75 were used for both itinerant and local military purposes, totaling to 150, while there were 3,600 aircraft movements for commercial use air taxi services; a total of 3,081 movements were provided for itinerant general aviation needs and 1,169 were used for local general aviation services. No aircraft used the airport in 2006 and 2007 although the following year, 15,396 did. Of these aircraft movements, 75 were used for local military purposes, 2,887 for commercial air taxi purposes, 9,626 for itinerant general aviation use and 2,808 for local general aviation service. A total of 15,396 also used the airfield the following year, having gained the same number of movements under the same categories.

In 2010, when a 72.4 percent decrease was represented, a total of 4,254 aircraft used the Omak Airport. 80 aircraft were used for local military purposes and there were 2,714 commercial air taxi movements, while the count for both itinerant and local general aviation was 730, totaling to 1,460. Statistics for based aircraft and passengers have also been recorded. In 1980, there were 32 based aircraft, 28 of which were single-engined and four were multi-engined, while in 1985, 29 aircraft were based, with the total of singled-engined planes being 27 and multi-engined being two. Meanwhile, the airport had 64 enplanement passenger boardings in 2000, 57 in 2001, 24 in 2002, 20 in 2003, 31 in 2004, 56 in 2005, 69 in 2006, 14 in 2007, 25 in 2008, 48 in 2009, and 23 in 2010. While the FAA has not released statistics, it was estimated that approximately 2,000 passengers were served in 2005. Overall, the highest number of movements it has gained yearly is 142,000 and lowest is 4,254 according to the WSDOT; the most based aircraft at the Omak Airport was 658 at one point.

== Facilities ==
=== Geography and climate ===
The Omak Airport, a non-towered airport that covers an area of 153 acres (62 ha) of city-owned property and 325 acres (132 ha) overall at an elevation of 1,305 feet (398 m), is located on 202 Omak Airport Road in Riverside, 3 miles (4.8 km) north of Omak's city centre, which is the municipality it primarily serves, situated off Washington State Route 20 and Washington State Route 97 on a mountainous and forested terrain. However, some people have stated it is based in Omak city limits regardless. It is located 41.3 miles (66.5 km) south of the Canada–United States border and opposite the Duck Lake, Fry Lake and Proctor Lake attractions, which are lakes based in the area; to the east of the airfield are mountain peaks. The nearest commercial airport is the Penticton Regional Airport, 79.3 miles (127.6 km) north in the Canadian city of Penticton. It is part of the Okanogan County minimum requirement district, and North Omak Business Park. Due to its location, the airport serves the Okanogan County as a whole, and nearby communities outside of that county.

This is one of three aviation services serving the Omak area, the others being Mid-Valley Hospital EMS Heliport, 5.3 miles (8.5 km) south, and Wings for Christ Airport, 3.6 miles (5.8 km) southeast, which are available for private use. Paid parking, taxis and car rentals are available, but there is no bus service. There are 34 tie-in parking spaces offered that are enlarged. The local and upcoming weather of Omak and Riverside is observed at its weather station, which provides real-time climatologically data, such as wind directions and speed using an automated surface observation system. The station determined that the Omak Airport itself experiences a semi-arid climate (Köppen climate classification BSk). With little precipitation, hot summers, and moderate winters, it annually handles 15.72 inches (399 mm) of precipitation, an average high of 56.1 °F (13.4 °C), a daily mean of 47.3 °F (8.5 °C), an average low of 39.2 °F (4.0 °C) and 46.12 inches (1,171 mm) of snow. These statistics differ significantly from central Omak.

Climate data for Omak Airport
Month	Jan	Feb	Mar	Apr	May	Jun	Jul	Aug	Sep	Oct	Nov	Dec	Year
Mean daily maximum °F (°C)	31 (−1)	38 (3)	46 (8)	56 (13)	65 (18)	72 (22)	82 (28)	80 (27)	71 (22)	58 (14)	41 (5)	33 (1)	56 (13)
Daily mean °F (°C)	26 (−3)	32 (0)	38 (3)	46 (8)	55 (13)	62 (17)	69 (21)	68 (20)	59 (15)	48 (9)	35 (2)	29 (−2)	47 (9)
Mean daily minimum °F (°C)	21 (−6)	26 (−3)	30 (−1)	36 (2)	44 (7)	51 (11)	56 (13)	56 (13)	48 (9)	48 (9)	30 (−1)	24 (−4)	39 (4)
Record low °F (°C)	−21 (−29)	−18 (−28)	−3 (−19)	22 (−6)	27 (−3)	35 (2)	31 (−1)	35 (2)	26 (−3)	15 (−9)	−12 (−24)	−18 (−28)	−21 (−29)
Average precipitation inches (mm)	2.03 (52)	1.46 (37)	1.44 (37)	1.04 (26)	1.29 (33)	1.04 (26)	0.49 (12)	0.68 (17)	0.79 (20)	1.14 (29)	2.13 (54)	2.19 (56)	15.72 (399)
Average snowfall inches (cm)	14.81 (37.6)	7.01 (17.8)	3.11 (7.9)	0.59 (1.5)	0.12 (0.30)	0 (0)	0 (0)	0 (0)	0 (0)	0.39 (0.99)	6.30 (16.0)	13.79 (35.0)	46.12 (117.09)
Source: MyForecast

=== Runways and terminals ===
Food and snacks are available at this airport's terminal, as well as a medical facility, accommodation areas, administrative offices and hangar buildings maintained by the Omak City Council; some of these serve as pilot lounges, while three office spaces exist. There are also off-site buildings relating to the airport, several of which are used for storage purposes. The based aircraft obtain their fuel from Chevron Corporation, which is located on site and serves as an aviation dealer. This site is home to a self-service automated fuel pump system by the company which serves 100LL avgas, just outside the terminal, and credit card purchasing system. Per year, about 50,000 US gallons (190,000 L; 42,000 imp gal) of fuel are sold. There is also a FedEx Express drop-off box available for public use. As of 1999 when a performance survey was conducted for improvement, the airfield has a 4,667 by 150 feet (1,423 by 46 m) paved, asphalt runway aligned 17–35 that is equipped with automated lights and maintains a published global positioning system non-precision approach approved by the FAA, making it the largest in the Okanogan County and third largest in Central Washington, that large aircraft and bomb tankers may land on. Military transportation rights have been secured for the airport.

The runway, which is home to a non-directional beacon, is inspected occasionally by land development and transportation service organization WHPacific, is home to a full-length 50 feet (15 m) taxiway which was developed in 1997 and finished by 1999 in addition to a taxilane between hangar buildings in "fair to poor condition" according to the WSDOT. There is guidance provided on the runway for use by pilots who use it. Its orientation is determined by the direction of winds. Its freight volume includes 910,000 pounds (410,000 kg) of deplaned cargo and an enplane of 100,000 pounds (45,000 kg). The airfield contains three apron areas, all of which are situated on the east side. The fueling apron is the southernmost apron in the airport, with a 325 by 200 feet (99 by 61 m) region with concrete anchors, while the central one is an asphalt 140 by 200 feet (43 by 61 m) tie-down. With a dimension of 195 by 688 feet (59 by 210 m), the northernmost apron is covered by asphalt and is a tie-down. Funds for airport improvement in the future consists of $48,675.

=== Services ===
A private business instructor offers flying lessons at the airfield, while Omak Aircraft Services is based on site and offers airframe and powerplant repairs. Since August 2008 when a large fire occurred around Omak and surrounding communities, the Bureau of Indian Affairs and Washington State Department of Natural Resources (DNR) have been permitted to land large tanker aircraft and helicopters at it for firefighting purposes; this service frequents in the summer months. The critical aircraft, which refers to what the airfield was initially designed for and has landed at it at least 500 times, serves as the Cessna 208 Caravan according to WSDOT database records. The Seattle Air Route Traffic Control Center, based in Auburn about 243 miles (391 km) away, manages traffic at the airport, in addition to all other airports in Washington and some selected airfields in other nearby states.

There is a radio navigation aid provided at the Omak Airport which are used by pilots on aircraft coming from other nearby airports to determine their location. The navigation system is owned by the Omak City Council, operates 24 hours daily, and serves a number of surrounding airports that do not contain these aids. Other navigational purpose aids include a communication system, full-instrument landing approach system, lighted wind sock and segmented circle. A water system is situated at the Omak Airport as well, and there are proposals to improve it. While telephone service is provided by US West, power to the E-class airfield in Omak, is offered by the Okanogan County Public Utilities District. There have been proposals from the FAA to amend its E-class status by extending upward to an elevation of 700 feet (210 m) and removing its non-active navigation aid since January 2013. The FAA noted that the size and shape of the Omak Airport would still stay the same by using its airport reference point. According to them, the regulation would only involve technical facilities. Owned and operated by the Omak City Council, the airport contains a number of employees including manager Ken Mears. Having been surveyed by the U.S. National Geodetic Survey and part of the Civil Rights Act of 1964, it serves as a member of the National Plan of Integrated Airport Systems (NPIAS) for 2011–2015, which categorized it as a general aviation airport, along with two other Okanogan airports: Anderson Field and Dorothy Scott Airport. The NPIAS has commercial airports, reliever and selected general aviation airports part of their system.

The Omak Airport's revenue resources include fuel sales, landing fees and rental fees set by the Omak City Council. While aircraft fuel charges are $0.50 per gallon, landing fees are charged to commercial contact carriers who do not purchase at least 20 US gallons (76 L; 17 imp gal) of fuel for their respective airplane, typically $40 per month. Tanker aircraft are also charged for this reasoning unless they buy gas at a rate of $0.20 per 1,000 pounds (450 kg) of maximum depending on aircraft weight usually. In addition, there are hangar lease fees; all hangars are owned and operated by the Omak City Council with a $0.09 per square foot rate annually. In January 2012, there were plans for an airport technical maintainer to be obtained. After expressing this interest in improving their airport, the Omak City Council requested access to letters of interests from qualified consultants who would like to provide design and construction of it for a period of five years in April 2012. The Washington State Office of Minority & Women's Business stated that management offerings may also be included in what the consultant chosen must perform.

== Airlines and destinations ==
Although this airport does not support direct commercial flights, it does provide three daily charter flights and general aviation services from Monday to Friday to other selected destinations, including the Pangborn Memorial Airport, by charter airlines such as Ameriflight and Empire Airlines. For the 12-month period ending on May 30, 2012, the airport garnered 23,750 aircraft movements, 1,000 of which were for cargo use with an average of 63 per day for all of the movements, making it the second busiest airport in the Okanogan County after Anderson Field, which gained 25,000 aircraft operations approximately. Of these aircraft movements, 3,600 of them were used for air taxi purposes, while 5,500 aircraft used it for local general aviation services; the aircraft operation count for itinerant general aviation was 14,500. Meanwhile, there were 150 military aircraft operations, meaning that based on all of these statistics, the following data was calculated: 61 percent used it for itinerant general aviation, while 23 percent used it for local general aviation; 15 percent used it for air taxi services and 1 percent for military purposes.

There were also three based aircraft, all of which were single engined, and two enplanement passenger boardings as of 2011. Updated statistics for the Omak Airport are scheduled to be released in July 2013. Although statistics have not been released by the FAA, it has been thought that a number of services are provided for commuter passenger service by the Omak City Council. Packages can be delivered to other airports by FedEx and the United Parcel Service (UPS) using Cessna 208 Caravans and Beechcraft Model 18s from Empire Airlines, FedEx Express and Pierce Aviation; the second has a fuel contract with the Omak City Council. Lifeline Aviation also commonly uses the airport. There is no non-commercial landing fee.

== See also ==
- List of airports in Washington
