= Flight 358 =

Flight 358 may refer to

- TWA Flight 358, hijacked on 11 June 1971
- Avensa Flight 358, 22 December 1974
- China Airlines Flight 358, 29 December 1991
- Air France Flight 358, crashed on 2 August 2005
