= TWA Flight 6963 =

1946 aviation accident

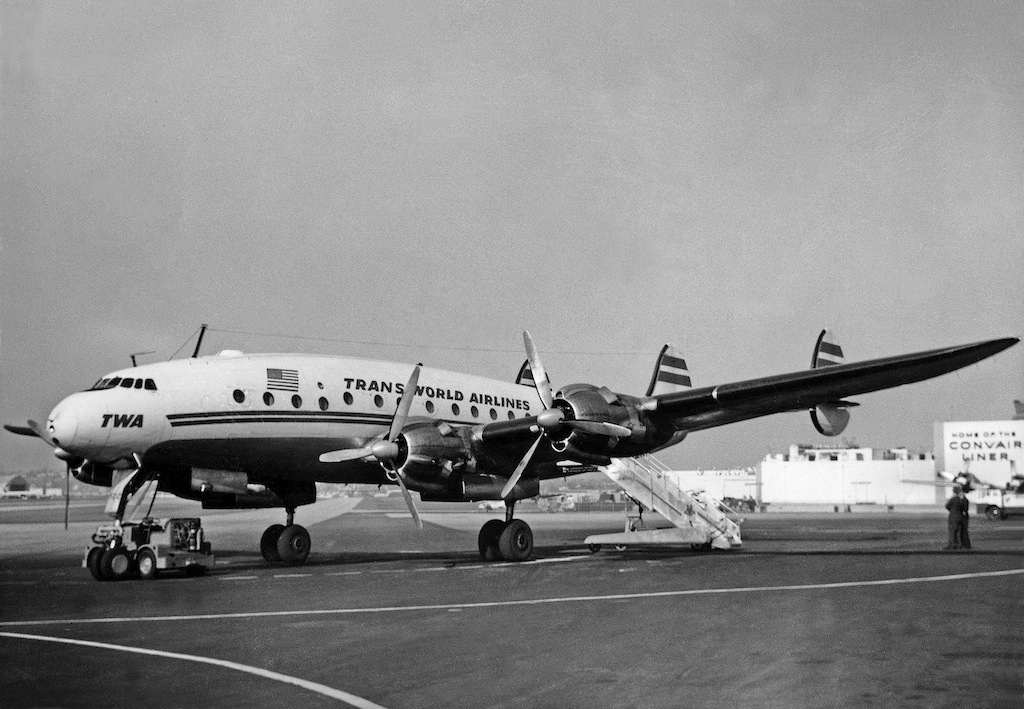
- N86502, sister-ship to the accident aircraft in a later livery.

Accident
- Date: December 28, 1946
- Summary: CFIT due to an inaccurate altimeter caused by maintenance errors
- Site: 1.5 km (0.93 mi) west-northwest of Shannon Airport; 52°42′39.0″N 8°57′22.0″W

Aircraft
- Aircraft type: Lockheed L-049 Constellation
- Aircraft name: Cairo Skychief
- Operator: Transcontinental & Western Air (TWA)
- Registration: NC86505
- Flight origin: Orly Airport, France
- 1st stopover: Shannon Airport, Ireland
- Last stopover: Gander Airport, Newfoundland
- Destination: LaGuardia Airport, New York City
- Occupants: 23
- Passengers: 14
- Crew: 9
- Fatalities: 9
- Survivors: 14

TWA Flight 6963, a scheduled Transcontinental & Western Air flight from Paris Orly Airport to New York City with scheduled stops at Shannon Airport and Gander, crashed on 28 December 1946 about 1.5 kilometres (0.81 nmi) west-northwest of Shannon Airport on the island of Inismacnaughton.

== The flight ==
The flight was being operated by Lockheed L-049 Constellation NC86505, c/n 2026, named Cairo Skychief. On approach to Shannon airport the aircraft struck the ground on Inishmacnaughton and was destroyed by fire, having broken up on impact. Of the 23 people on board, nine died; four crew members and five passengers, however, a 1947 amendment to the CAB report states that nine passengers died.

This TWA flight was authorised to carry persons, property and mail between the cities of the route. It was reported in The Times that this was a mail carrying flight and that the mails were retrieved but, as of 1997, no covers have been noted.

== The accident ==
Cairo Skychief departed Paris-Orly at 23:16 arriving at Shannon at 02:00 when Shannon control tower cleared the aircraft for approach to runway 14. At 02:06 the crew reported being over the range station at 1,200 ft (370 m). Shannon Tower advised the crew that Shannon was reporting 10/10 cloud cover at 400 ft (120 m), 4/10 at 250 ft (76 m), visibility 1 mi (1.6 km), wind 120 degrees, 5 kn (9.3 km/h; 5.8 mph). During the left turn onto final, the aircraft passed behind a low hill blocking the airport lights from the pilot's vision, the aircraft lost altitude and the port wing-tip struck the ground; the aircraft crashed and caught fire.

Captain Herbert W. Tansey and First Officer Clifford V. Sparrow were seriously injured, but were among the survivors. The Irish Department of Industry and Commerce, the U.S. Civil Aeronautics Administration, and the TWA Regional Accident Board started an investigation into the crash. Investigators arrived in Shannon on 31 December for the local phase and later phases took place in London, New York, and Wilmington, with a public hearing on 30 and 31 January 1947, in New York City.

== Causes ==
Contributory causes were determined to have been the incorrect assembly of the instruments static pipelines and the poor weather conditions.
