= Pangborn Memorial Airport =

Airport in Washington, United States

- FAA airport diagram
- IATA: EAT; ICAO: KEAT; FAA LID: EAT

Summary
- Airport type: Public
- Owner: Ports of Chelan and Douglas Counties
- Serves: Wenatchee, Washington
- Elevation AMSL: 1,249 ft (381 m)
- Coordinates: 47°23′53″N 120°12′21″W

Map
- Location within Washington (state) Location within the United States

Runways
Direction	Length		Surface
Direction	ft	m	Surface
7/25	4,460	1,359	Closed
12/30	7,000	2,134	Asphalt

Statistics (2017)
- Aircraft operations: 44,376
- Based aircraft: 108
- Source: Federal Aviation Administration

Pangborn Memorial Airport (IATA: EAT, ICAO: KEAT, FAA LID: EAT) is in Douglas County, Washington, four miles east of Wenatchee, a city in Chelan County. The airport is owned by the Ports of Chelan and Douglas Counties.

The airport is used for general aviation and is served by one airline (Horizon Air), offering in-state service. SeaPort Airlines served the airport until winter 2012. As of September 28, 2006, Pangborn Memorial began supporting ILS (Instrument Landing System) approaches.

Pangborn Memorial Airport is named for Clyde Pangborn, who in 1931 was the first pilot to fly non-stop across the Pacific Ocean. Taking off from Misawa, Aomori, Japan with an intended destination of Seattle, he and his co-pilot, Hugh Herndon Jr., instead landed in Wenatchee.

== History ==
In 2009, the FAA recommended and approved an expansion of the Pangborn runway to 7,000 feet.

== Facilities ==
Pangborn Memorial Airport covers 665 acres (269 ha) at an elevation of 1,249 feet (381 m). It has one asphalt runway: runway 12/30 is 7,000 by 150 feet (2,134 x 46 m). A former runway, designated as runway 7/25, is closed; it was 4,460 by 75 feet (1,359 x 23 m).

== Airline and destinations ==
In the year ending December 31, 2017, the airport had 44,376 aircraft operations, average 121 per day: 89% general aviation, 5% air taxi, 5% airline and 1% military. 108 aircraft were then based at this airport: 82 single-engine, 7 multi-engine, 2 jet, 5 helicopter, 10 glider and 2 ultralight.

The airport has Alaska Airlines service to Seattle. On October 3, 2026, Alaska Airlines will launch additional service to Portland, Oregon on Embraer 175s operated by Horizon Air.

=== Passenger ===
Airlines	Destinations
Alaska Airlines	Portland (OR) , Seattle/Tacoma

Destination map
Destinations from Pangborn Memorial Airport
Red = Year-round destination
Blue = Future destination

=== Cargo ===
Airlines	Destinations
Ameriflight	Omak, Seattle–Boeing
FedEx Feeder	Spokane

== Statistics ==
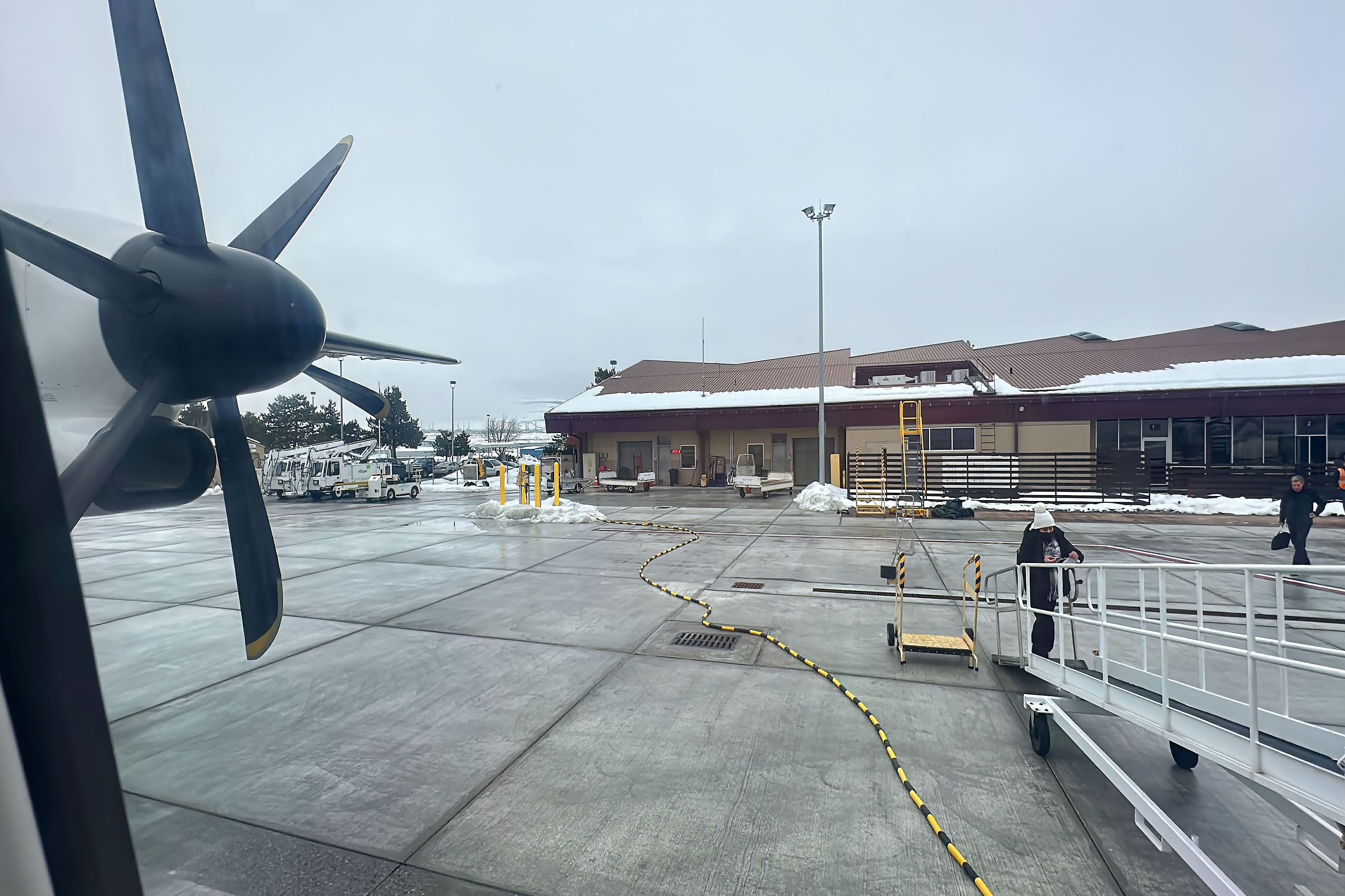
View of the terminal from a Horizon Air Dash 8-400

=== Top destinations ===
Busiest domestic routes from EAT (September 2022 – August 2023)
Rank	City	Passengers	Carriers
1	Seattle/Tacoma, Washington	20,680	Alaska

== See also ==
- List of airports in Washington
