= Riverside, Washington =

Riverside
- Town
- Riverside, Washington
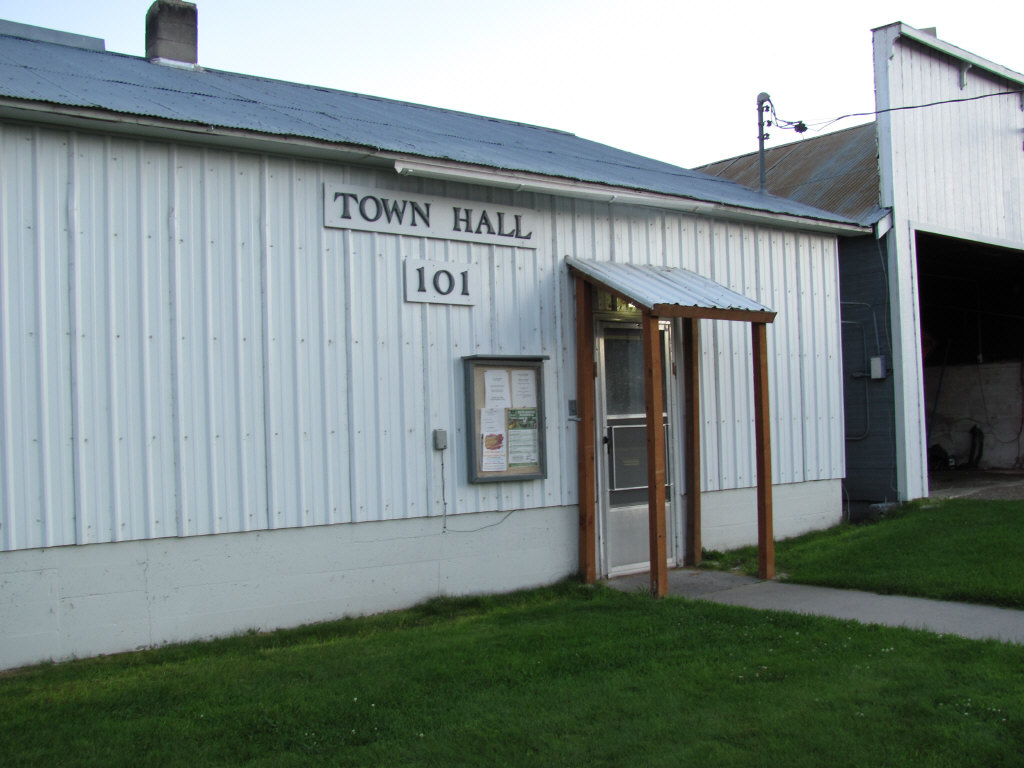
- Riverside City Hall

- Location of Riverside, Washington
- Coordinates: 48°30′00″N 119°30′12″W
- Country: United States
- State: Washington
- County: Okanogan

Government
  - Mayor: Kyle Nelson

Area
  - Total: 0.94 sq mi (2.43 km^{2})
  - Land: 0.89 sq mi (2.30 km^{2})
  - Water: 0.050 sq mi (0.13 km^{2})
- Elevation: 929 ft (283 m)

Population (2020)
  - Total: 329
  - Density: 370/sq mi (143/km^{2})
- Time zone: UTC-8 (Pacific (PST))
  - Summer (DST): UTC-7 (PDT)
- ZIP code: 98849
- Area code: 509
- FIPS code: 53-58795
- GNIS feature ID: 2412556

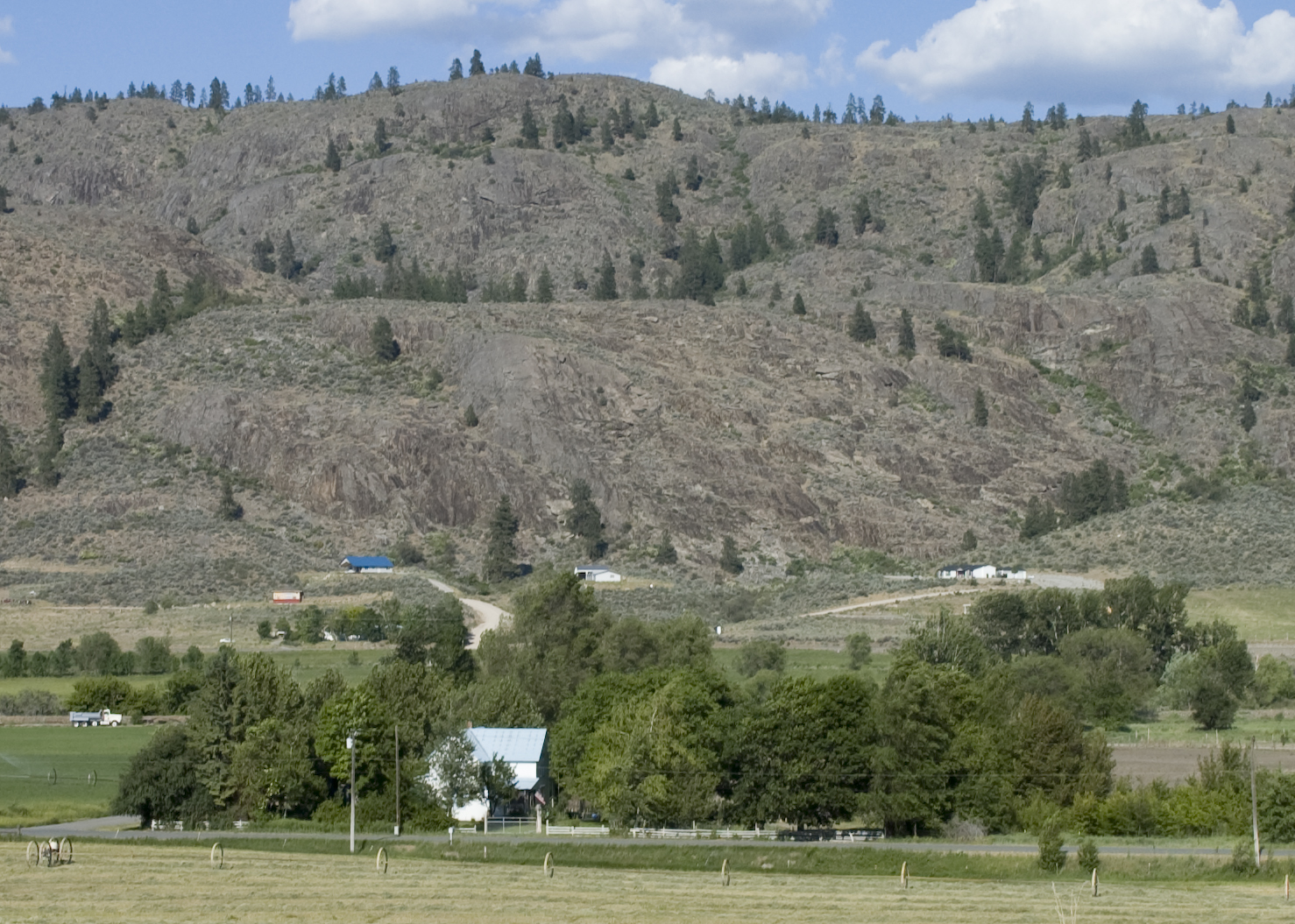
Farm and barren hills near Riverside

Riverside is a town in Okanogan County, Washington, United States. The population was 280 at the 2010 census, and increased to 329 at the 2020 census.

== History ==
Riverside was first settled in the 1880s by Uriah Ward. When steamboats began traveling up the Okanogan River, Riverside was the upstream limit of navigation during the high water season. Riverside was officially incorporated on December 22, 1913. Riverside is one of the few locations in the world where the mineral thulite is found, the others being Mitchell County, North Carolina; Orkland, Norway; and the Otago region of New Zealand.

== Geography ==
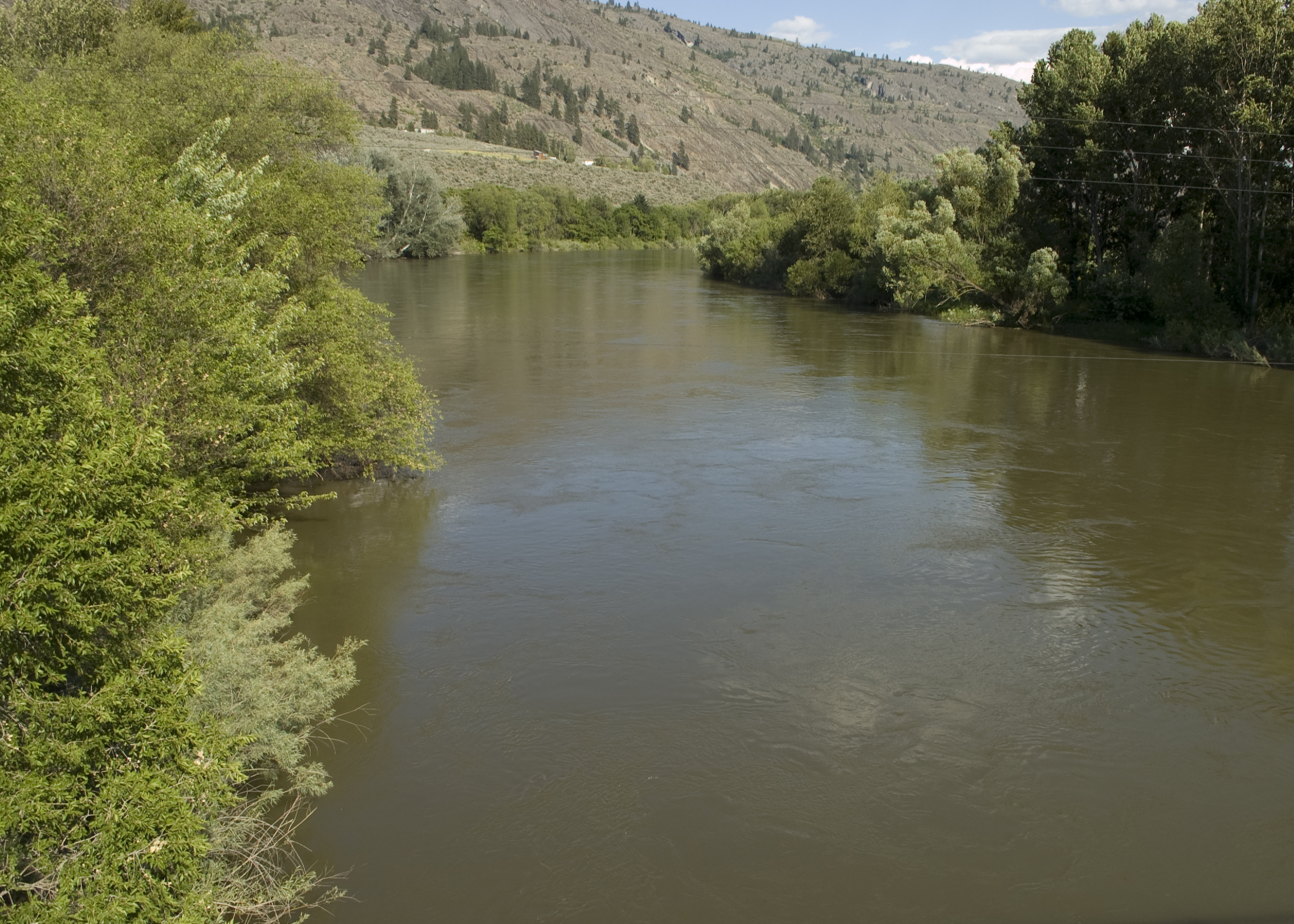
The Okanogan River at Riverside

According to the United States Census Bureau, the town has a total area of 0.99 square miles (2.56 km^{2}), of which, 0.97 square miles (2.51 km^{2}) is land and 0.02 square miles (0.05 km^{2}) is water. Sometimes considered to be part of Greater Omak, it is home to the Omak Airport.

== Demographics ==
Historical population
| Census | Pop. | Note | %± |
|---|---|---|---|
| 1920 | 209 | | — |
| 1930 | 218 | | 4.3% |
| 1940 | 192 | | −11.9% |
| 1950 | 149 | | −22.4% |
| 1960 | 201 | | 34.9% |
| 1970 | 228 | | 13.4% |
| 1980 | 243 | | 6.6% |
| 1990 | 223 | | −8.2% |
| 2000 | 348 | | 56.1% |
| 2010 | 280 | | −19.5% |
| 2020 | 329 | | 17.5% |
U.S. Decennial Census; 2020 Census

=== 2010 census ===
As of the 2010 census, there were 280 people, 128 households, and 78 families living in the town. The population density was 288.7 inhabitants per square mile (111.5/km^{2}). There were 154 housing units at an average density of 158.8 per square mile (61.3/km^{2}). The racial makeup of the town was 87.1% White, 7.5% Native American, 1.8% from other races, and 3.6% from two or more races. Hispanic or Latino of any race were 6.4% of the population.

There were 128 households, of which 23.4% had children under the age of 18 living with them, 45.3% were married couples living together, 10.9% had a female householder with no husband present, 4.7% had a male householder with no wife present, and 39.1% were non-families. 32.8% of all households were made up of individuals, and 10.9% had someone living alone who was 65 years of age or older. The average household size was 2.17 and the average family size was 2.68.

The median age in the town was 47 years. 20% of residents were under the age of 18; 5.7% were between the ages of 18 and 24; 21.8% were from 25 to 44; 30.4% were from 45 to 64; and 22.1% were 65 years of age or older. The gender makeup of the town was 50.0% male and 50.0% female.

=== 2000 census ===
As of the 2000 census, there were 348 people, 143 households, and 95 families living in the town. The population density was 389.5 people per square mile (151.0/km^{2}). There were 153 housing units at an average density of 171.2 per square mile (66.4/km^{2}). The racial makeup of the town was 90.52% White, 0.29% African American, 5.17% Native American, 0.29% Asian, 1.15% from other races, and 2.59% from two or more races. Hispanic or Latino of any race were 2.87% of the population.

There were 143 households, out of which 30.1% had children under the age of 18 living with them, 49.0% were married couples living together, 11.9% had a female householder with no husband present, and 32.9% were non-families. 24.5% of all households were made up of individuals, and 11.9% had someone living alone who was 65 years of age or older. The average household size was 2.43 and the average family size was 2.93. In the town, the population dispersal was 26.7% under the age of 18, 5.7% from 18 to 24, 27.9% from 25 to 44, 21.3% from 45 to 64, and 18.4% who were 65 years of age or older. The median age was 39 years. For every 100 females, there were 105.9 males. For every 100 females age 18 and over, there were 104.0 males.

The median income for a household in the town was $23,125, and the median income for a family was $28,250. Males had a median income of $28,750 versus $19,375 for females. The per capita income for the town was $11,297. About 12.9% of families and 18.4% of the population were below the poverty line, including 24.4% of those under age 18 and 9.2% of those age 65 or over.

== Education ==
The town is served by the Omak School District.
