= Frank S. Matsura =

American photographer

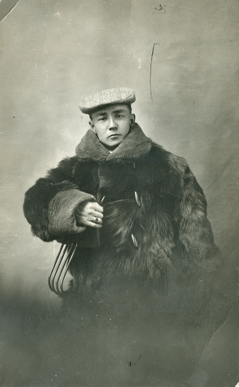
Self-portrait of Frank (Sakae) Matsura (circa 1904)

Frank (Sakae) Matsura (1873–1913) was an early 20th-century Japanese photographer who travelled from Japan to America in 1901 where he lived until his early death. More than 1,800 of his frontier-era photographs and glass plate negatives have been preserved by the Okanogan County Historical Society and Washington State University.

He was born Sakae Matsuura (松浦 栄, Matsūra Sakae) in 1873, a descendant of Emperor Saga, the 52nd emperor of Japan, through the Matsuura, lords of Hirado Island (northwest of Kyūshū). For unknown reasons, Matsura led his friends and acquaintances to believe he was seven years younger than he actually was. For example, the US Census sheet for 1910 lists his age as 28, and the headstone on his grave states "aged 32 years" in 1913. Researchers discovered his passport application dated 1901 for a "Sakae Matsuura" that lists his age at 27. Matsura's earliest photos give his name as Frank S. Matsuura.

Frank S. Matsura's father and uncle were samurai, serving Tokugawa Yoshinobu, 15th Shōgun of the Tokugawa Shogunate. After the Meiji Restoration in 1868, the family entered the tea business. Matsura's parents died, and he was raised by an uncle and aunt, learning English at a school they founded in Tokyo. As further evidence of his family's high standing, he possessed a ceremonial sword.

In 1903, he answered an ad in a Seattle newspaper for a cook's helper and laundryman placed by Jesse Dillabough, owner of the Elliott Hotel in Conconully, Washington, and was hired. He arrived with his camera equipment and began photographing the Okanogan region. His photographic subjects were wide and varied and included portraits, infrastructure projects such as the construction of Conconully Dam, Native Americans, celebrations and parades, stage coaches, riverboats, farming and ranching, and virtually all aspects of the lives of the people of Okanogan county.

For four years he worked at the Elliott Hotel, developing his pictures in the laundry, before relocating to the growing city of Okanogan in 1907. In Okanogan, he built a two-room store on First Avenue which served as a studio and darkroom.

Although business was initially slow, Matsura became popular for his portraits, and promotional photos of the Okanogan. The Okanogan Commercial Club distributed his work in brochures and postcards, and several images were exhibited at the Alaska–Yukon–Pacific Exposition (AYPE) of 1909 in Seattle, where they attracted favorable notice. In fact, the AYPE official photographer and photographic curator J. A. McCormick sent a letter to Matsura informing him that Matsura's collection of photographs was the best he had secured of all the photographs he had received from all over the nation to be displayed during the AYPE.

Some of Matsura's work features a distinctly zany streak, particularly in costume photographs featuring local residents, or a photograph in which the Okanogan baseball team, Sam's Colts, imagine and dress themselves as old men. Matsura also had a pioneering spirit, participating in and photographing the clearing of the first 26-mile auto trail between Okanogan to Condon Ferry, cutting forty miles off the transit from Okanogan to Spokane.

Matsura maintained close relations with many prominent local families and photographed them often. The Dillaboughs, Nelsons, Browns, Schallers and Gards appear in many of his most inventive and comical photos. His subjects were captured at birthday parties, town events, school graduations and in formal studio portraits. His landscape images capture the end of the pioneer era, and his portraits of Native Americans remain some of the finest captured during the era.

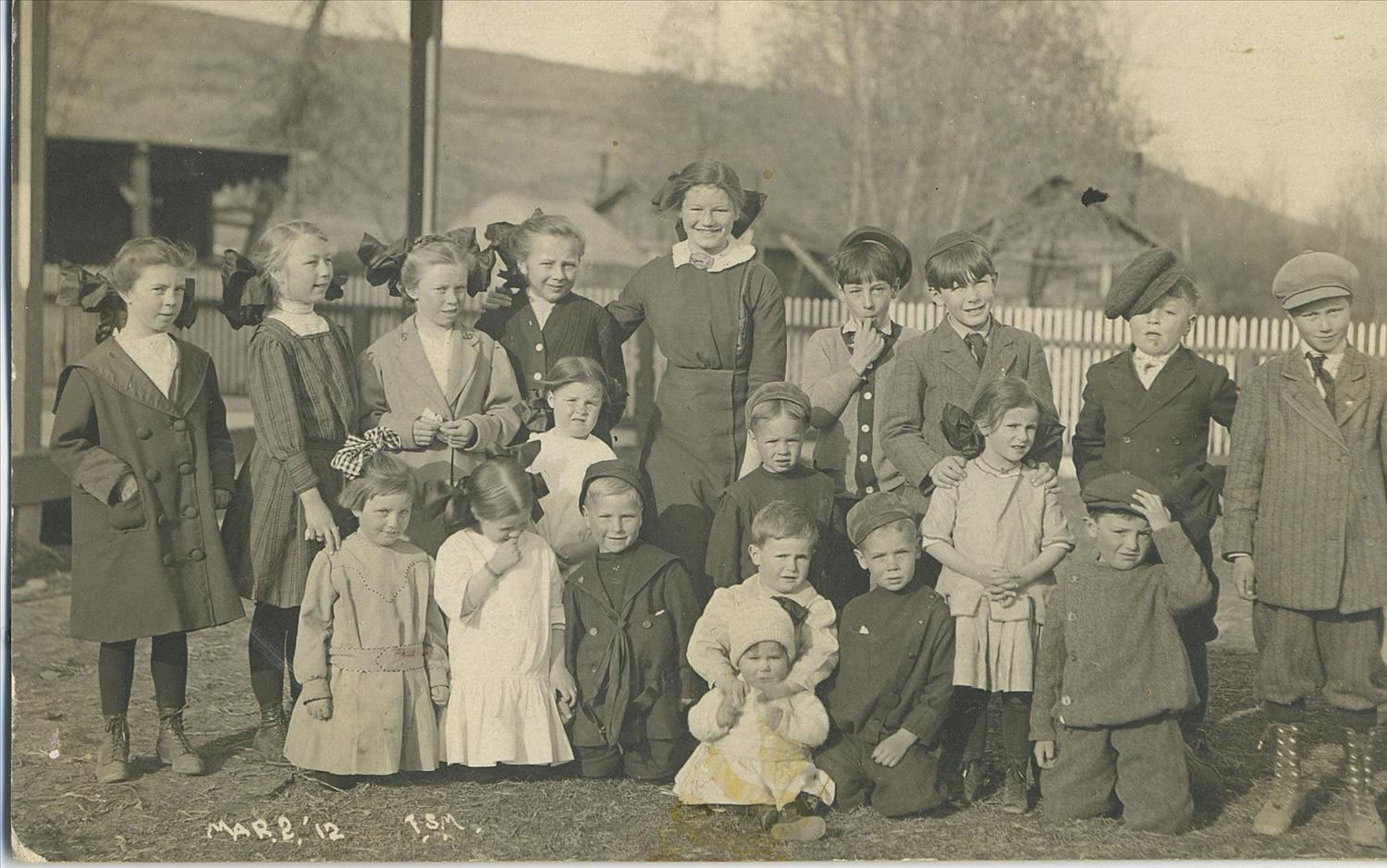
Matsura photograph taken in Okanogan, March 2, 1912, for the fifth birthday of Ardes Nelson (2nd from right, front row), her brother Tyler is 4th from right, front row, holding their sister Brownie. Ardes Nelson was the eldest granddaughter of Jess Dillabough, Matsura's former employer.

Matsura candidly disclosed that he suffered from tuberculosis, but Okanogan was profoundly shocked when he died suddenly on June 16, 1913, at the age of only 39. Matsura was a respected and beloved figure in this frontier region that he documented with his camera. His funeral attracted more than three hundred Native American and pioneer mourners. A newspaper article which appeared in the June 20, 1913 edition of the Okanogan Independent states in part:

A shadow of sorrow was cast over the community early in the week by the sudden death on Monday night of Frank S. Matsura, the Japanese photographer who has been a part and parcel of the city ever since its establishment seven years ago.... Although an unpretentious, unassuming, modest little Japanese, Frank Matsura's place in Okanogan city will never be filled. He was a photographer of fine ability and his studio contains a collection of views that form a most complete photographic history of this city and surrounding country covering a period of seven or eight years. He was always on the job. Whenever anything happened Frank was there with his camera to record the event.... He has done more to advertise Okanogan city and valley than any other individual. Furthermore Frank Matsura was a gentleman in every sense of the word. He held the highest esteem of all who knew him. He was one of the most popular men in Okanogan and was known from one end of this vast county to the other.... He was well educated, being a graduate from a Japanese college at Tokio, and had done newspaper work in his native land. He came from a wealthy and aristocratic family in Japan.

Matsura was buried in Okanogan and much of his work went to a close friend, Judge William Compton Brown. Brown ultimately donated it to the Washington State University archives, which has catalogued the images and placed a valuable collection on the internet. Several heavy boxes of Matsura's original glass negatives were discovered in Brown's garage after his death in 1963 and these were donated to the Okanogan County Historical Society by Eva Wilson, Brown's longtime caregiver, at the suggestion of Joseph Wicks, who had succeeded Brown as the Superior Court Judge of Okanogan County.

In 1984, TV Asahi in Japan aired a two-hour docudrama starring Morio Kazama as Matsura. Collections and exhibits of Matsura's work have also been published in Japan.

In 2002, Matsura was mentioned in the last page of the manga, Sky Hawk, as a photographer of indigenous peoples of the United States.

In 2024, the Northwest Museum of Arts and Culture exhibited Matsura's work in the "Frank S. Matsura: Portraits from the Borderland" exhibition.

== Books ==
- Fitzgerald, Georgene Davis. Frank S. Matsura, A Scrapbook. Okanogan County Historical Society, 2007.
- Kurihara, Tatsuo (栗原達男). Furanku to yobareta otoko: Seibu no shashinka "Matsuura Sakae" no kiseki (フランクと呼ばれた男―西部の写真家「松浦栄」の軌跡, A man named Frank: Memories of Sakae Matsuura, photographer of the West). (in Japanese) Tokyo: Jōhō Sentā Shuppankyoku, 1993. ISBN 4-7958-1422-8.
- Okanogan County Historical Society and the Omak-Okanogan County Chronicle, eds. Images of Okanogan County as Photographed by Frank S. Matsura. Pediment, 2002. ISBN 1-932129-20-0.
- Roe, JoAnn. Frank Matsura: Frontier Photographer. Seattle: Madrona, 1981. ISBN 0-914842-67-6. Canadian edition: The Real Old West: Images of a Frontier. Vancouver: Douglas & McIntyre, 1981. ISBN 0-88894-340-7.
- Wang, ShiPu. The Other American Moderns. Matsura, Ishigaki, Noda, Hayakawa. Penn State University Press, 2017. ISBN 978-0-271-07773-4.
