= Okanogan Legion Airport =

- IATA: none; ICAO: none; FAA LID: S35

Summary
- Airport type: Public
- Owner: City of Okanogan
- Serves: Okanogan, Washington
- Elevation AMSL: 1,042 ft / 318 m
- Coordinates: 48°21′43″N 119°34′03″W

Map
- Location of airport in Washington S35 (the United States)

Runways
Direction	Length		Surface
Direction	ft	m	Surface
4/22	2,533	772	Asphalt

Statistics (2012)
- Aircraft operations: 4,100
- Based aircraft: 14
- Source: Federal Aviation Administration

Okanogan Legion Airport (FAA LID: S35) is a city-owned, public-use airport located one nautical mile (2 km) east of the central business district of Okanogan, a city in Okanogan County, Washington, United States.

== Facilities and aircraft ==
Okanogan Legion Airport covers an area of 30 acres (12 ha) at an elevation of 1,042 feet (318 m) above mean sea level. It has one runway designated 4/22 with an asphalt surface measuring 2,533 by 36 feet (772 x 11 m).

For the 12-month period ending May 30, 2012, the airport had 4,100 aircraft operations, an average of 11 per day: 98% general aviation and 2% air taxi. At that time there were 14 aircraft based at this airport: 86% single-engine, 7% multi-engine, and 7% ultralight.

== See also ==
- List of airports in Washington
