= TWA Flight 6 =

1935 aircraft crash in Missouri, US

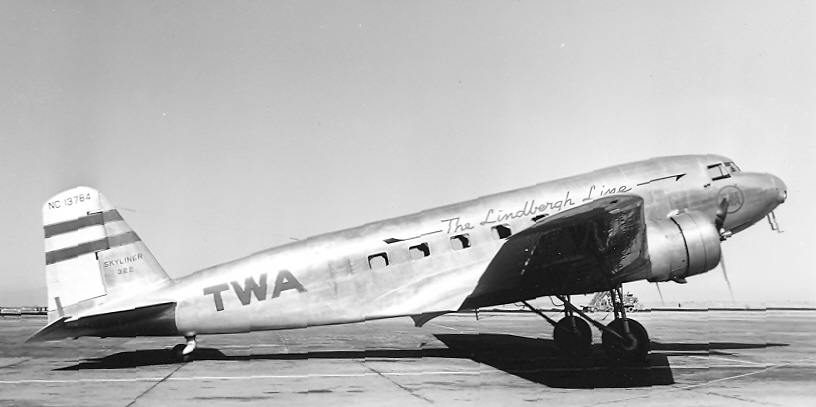
- A TWA Douglas DC-2 (NC13784) sister ship to the accident aircraft

Accident
- Date: May 6, 1935
- Summary: Controlled Flight Into Terrain when flying in low visibility
- Site: Near Atlanta, Missouri; 39.93°N 92.59°W

Aircraft
- Aircraft type: Douglas DC-2
- Operator: Transcontinental & Western Air
- Registration: NC13785
- Flight origin: Los Angeles, California
- 1st stopover: Albuquerque, New Mexico
- 2nd stopover: Kansas City, Missouri (not reached; additional stopovers omitted)
- Destination: Newark, New Jersey
- Passengers: 11
- Crew: 2
- Fatalities: 5
- Injuries: 8
- Survivors: 8

TWA Flight 6 was a Transcontinental & Western Air Douglas DC-2, on a route from Los Angeles to Newark, New Jersey, that crashed near Atlanta, Missouri, on May 6, 1935, killing five of the thirteen people on board, including Senator Bronson M. Cutting of New Mexico. The airliner crashed when its wingtip hit the ground as it flew under a low cloud ceiling at very low level, over dark, fog-shrouded country, while its pilots were trying desperately to reach a nearby emergency landing field before their fuel ran out.

Investigators from the Bureau of Air Commerce concluded that several factors had led up to this crisis, including communications malfunctions, darkness, inaccurate weather forecasts, worsening weather at the destination airport, and errors in judgment from both the airline dispatchers and the flight crew; they also found TWA in violation of several aviation regulations. Senator Cutting's death drove Congress to look into the Bureau's own management of civil aviation. Senator Royal S. Copeland established a special subcommittee, the Copeland Committee, which held hearings that harshly criticized the Bureau and released a controversial preliminary report that blamed the Bureau's management for the accident. This political battle played a major role in the Bureau of Air Commerce being replaced in 1938 by the newly formed Civil Aeronautics Authority.

== Bibliography ==
- Davies, John; Ross, Alastair; Wallace, Brendan (2017). Safety Management: A Qualitative Systems Approach. CRC Press. ISBN 978-1-351-98874-2.
