= Okanogan, Washington =

City in Washington, United States

Okanogan
- City
- City of Okanogan
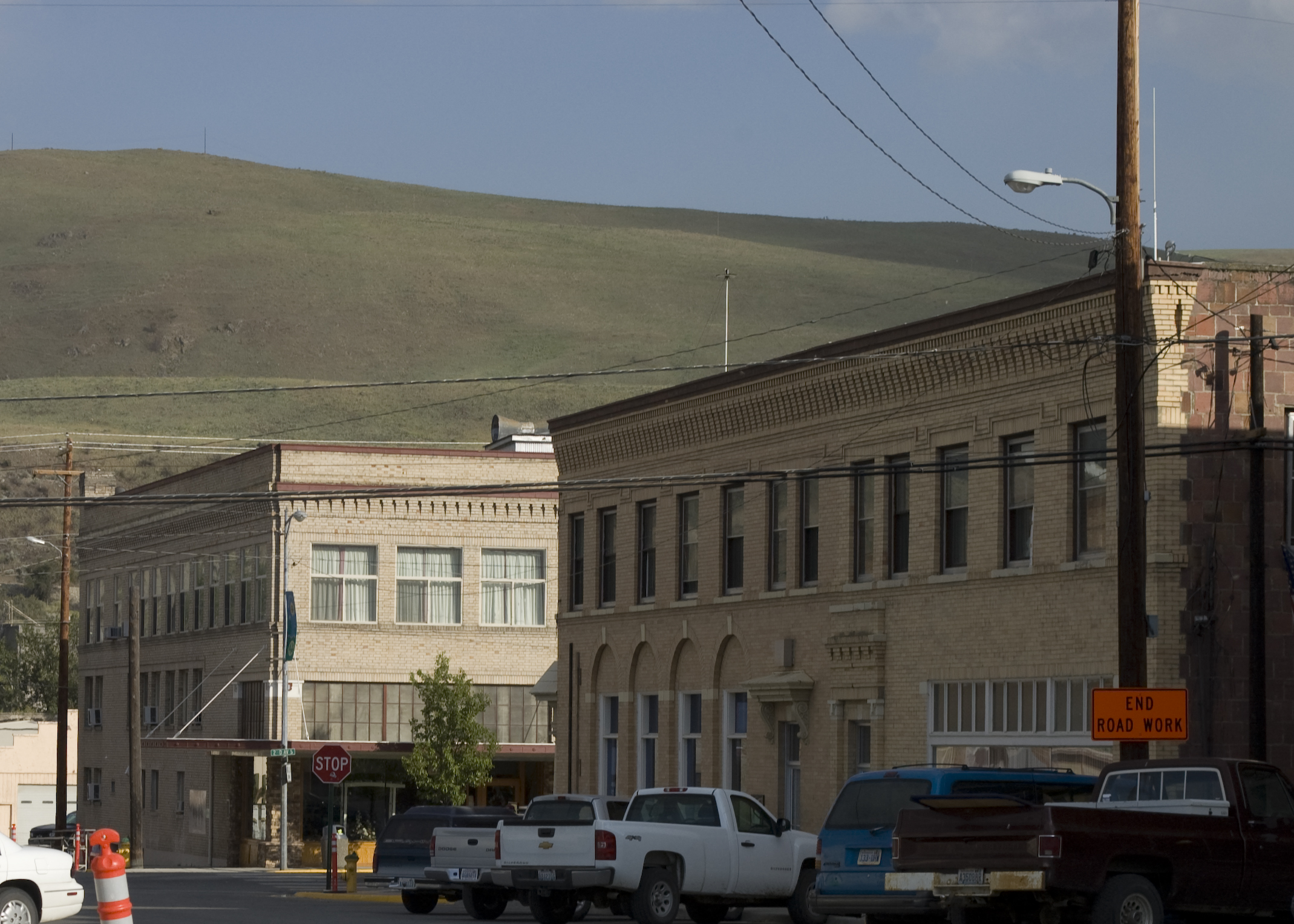
- Skyline of downtown Okanogan

- Motto: 100 Years of Community Pride
- Location of Okanogan in Okanogan County, Washington

- Location in the United States
- Coordinates: 48°22′42″N 119°34′02″W
- Country: United States
- State: Washington
- County: Okanogan
- Established: 1888
- Incorporated: October 29, 1907

Government
  - Type: Mayor–council
  - Mayor: Wayne Turner

Area
  - City: 2.12 sq mi (5.48 km^{2})
  - Land: 2.01 sq mi (5.20 km^{2})
  - Water: 0.11 sq mi (0.28 km^{2})
  - Urban: 4.736 sq mi (12.267 km^{2})
- Elevation: 860 ft (260 m)

Population (2020)
  - City: 2,379
  - Density: 1,180/sq mi (458/km^{2})
- Time zone: UTC-8 (PST)
  - Summer (DST): UTC-7 (PDT)
- ZIP code: 98840
- Area code: 509
- FIPS code: 53-50920
- GNIS feature ID: 2411309
- Website: www.okanogancity.com

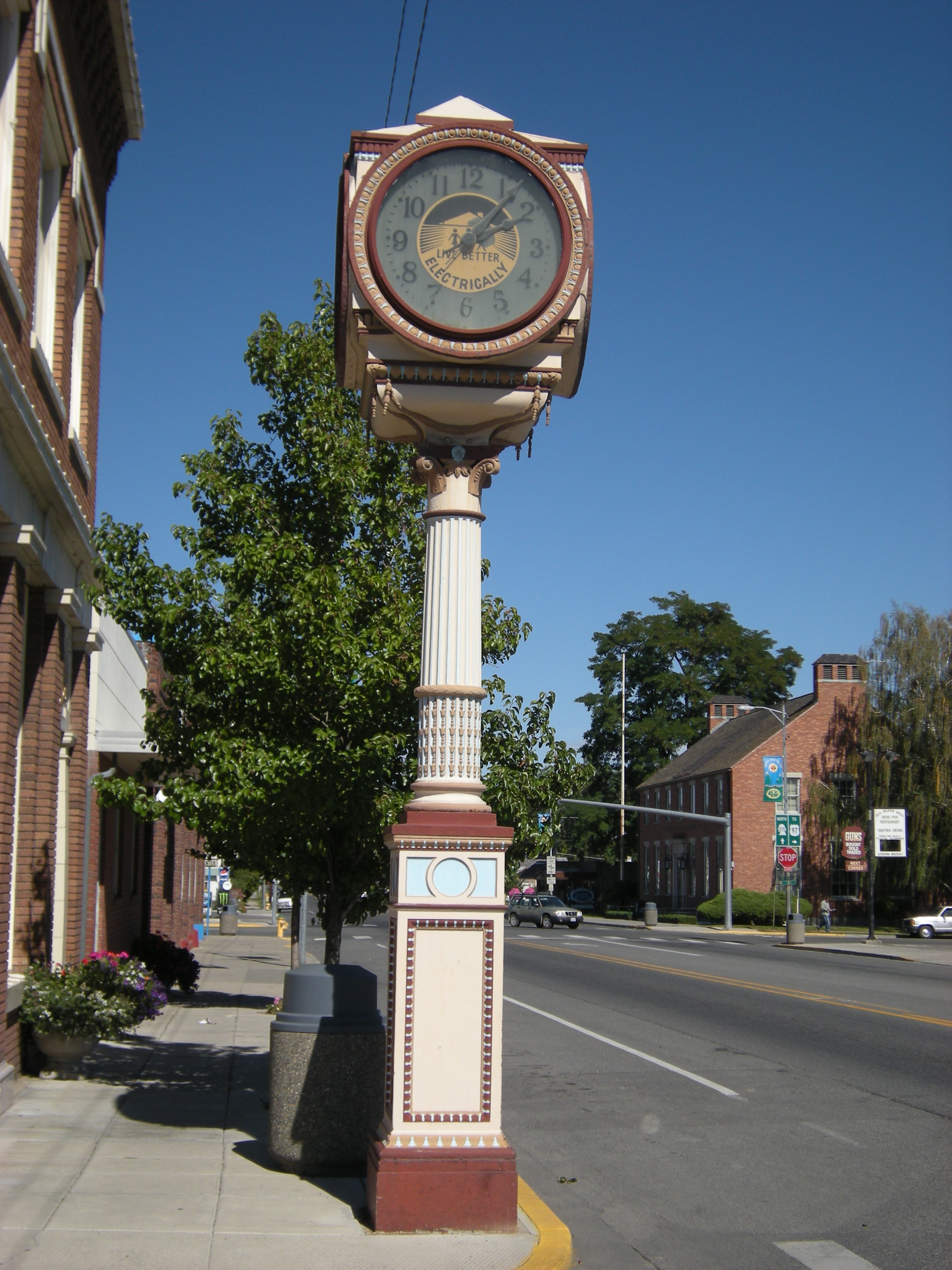

Okanogan (/ˌoʊkəˈnɒɡən/ OH-kə-NOG-ən; derived from Syilx'tsn: "rendezvous" or "meeting place") is a city in Okanogan County, Washington, United States. The population was 2,379 at the 2020 census, down from 2,552 at the 2010 census, within the Greater Omak Area. It is the county seat of Okanogan County.

It has a small commuter airfield, Okanogan Legion Airport – (S35) with one paved runway of 2,533 ft (772 m) in length.

== History ==
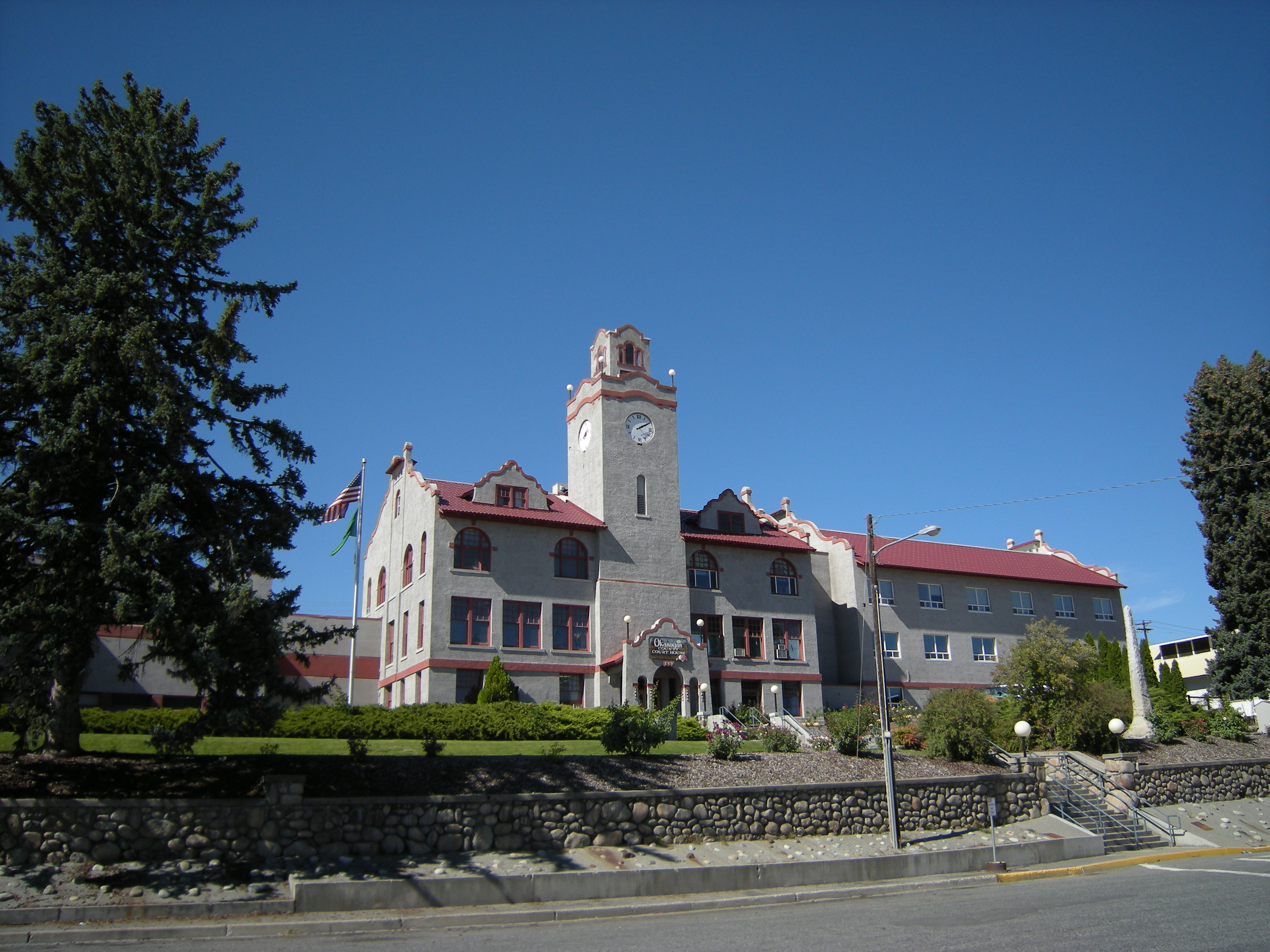
Okanogan County Courthouse, Okanogan, Washington

Okanogan was officially incorporated on October 29, 1907.

A pair of 115 year old, 60-foot-long (18 m) murals were discovered during renovation of a 1907 commercial building in January 2022. The murals were initially tentatively attributed to Western photographer Frank S. Matsura as the building had been used as a theater several times and Matsura had played in the Okanogan County Band on stage there. The mural is painted on canvases split between the north and south walls, and a 1915 newspaper clipping found by the Okanogan County Historical Society provided coverage of plans for the murals. Then the Hub Theater, the building was planned to incorporate panoramic scenery murals in tans painted by a local artist. further investigation lead to attribution of the murals to a Wenatchee painter W.J. McConnon. The owners planned to take the murals down for restoration before rehanging them as the centerpiece of a historical exhibit.

== Geography ==
According to the United States Census Bureau, the city has a total area of 2.00 square miles (5.18 km^{2}), of which, 1.95 square miles (5.05 km^{2}) is land and 0.05 square miles (0.13 km^{2}) is water.

The town is located along the Okanogan River.

=== Climate ===
Okanogan experiences a semi-arid climate (Köppen climate classification: BSk). A weather station is located in nearby Omak.

Climate data for Omak Municipal Airport (1909–2013)
Month	Jan	Feb	Mar	Apr	May	Jun	Jul	Aug	Sep	Oct	Nov	Dec	Year
Record high °F (°C)	60 (16)	63 (17)	79 (26)	96 (36)	101 (38)	117 (47)	114 (46)	107 (42)	102 (39)	90 (32)	77 (25)	67 (19)	117 (47)
Mean daily maximum °F (°C)	30.2 (−1.0)	38.3 (3.5)	51.9 (11.1)	64.1 (17.8)	73.5 (23.1)	80.6 (27.0)	88.8 (31.6)	87.1 (30.6)	77.1 (25.1)	62.2 (16.8)	43.6 (6.4)	33.0 (0.6)	60.9 (16.1)
Daily mean °F (°C)	23.4 (−4.8)	29.9 (−1.2)	40.4 (4.7)	50.1 (10.1)	58.4 (14.7)	65.4 (18.6)	72.2 (22.3)	70.5 (21.4)	61.2 (16.2)	48.8 (9.3)	35.5 (1.9)	26.9 (−2.8)	48.6 (9.2)
Mean daily minimum °F (°C)	16.6 (−8.6)	21.5 (−5.8)	29.0 (−1.7)	36.1 (2.3)	43.3 (6.3)	50.2 (10.1)	55.6 (13.1)	53.9 (12.2)	45.3 (7.4)	35.5 (1.9)	27.5 (−2.5)	20.8 (−6.2)	36.3 (2.4)
Record low °F (°C)	−22 (−30)	−26 (−32)	−7 (−22)	15 (−9)	19 (−7)	30 (−1)	35 (2)	31 (−1)	20 (−7)	8 (−13)	−6 (−21)	−21 (−29)	−26 (−32)
Average precipitation inches (mm)	1.32 (34)	1.08 (27)	0.83 (21)	0.87 (22)	0.98 (25)	1.13 (29)	0.61 (15)	0.49 (12)	0.56 (14)	0.89 (23)	1.44 (37)	1.66 (42)	11.86 (301)
Average snowfall inches (cm)	7.3 (19)	4.0 (10)	0.7 (1.8)	0 (0)	0 (0)	0 (0)	0 (0)	0 (0)	0 (0)	0 (0)	2.5 (6.4)	7.7 (20)	22.3 (57)
Average precipitation days (≥ 0.01 in)	8	6	5	5	5	6	3	3	4	5	8	9	68
Source: Western Regional Climate Center, The Weather Channel

== Demographics ==
Historical population
Census	Pop.	Note	%±
1910	611		—
1920	1,015		66.1%
1930	1,519		49.7%
1940	1,735		14.2%
1950	2,013		16.0%
1960	2,001		−0.6%
1970	2,015		0.7%
1980	2,326		15.4%
1990	2,370		1.9%
2000	2,484		4.8%
2010	2,552		2.7%
2020	2,379		−6.8%
U.S. Decennial Census; 2020 Census

=== 2020 census ===
As of the 2020 census, Okanogan had a population of 2,379. The median age was 39.9 years. 22.0% of residents were under the age of 18 and 20.2% of residents were 65 years of age or older. For every 100 females there were 101.6 males, and for every 100 females age 18 and over there were 99.8 males age 18 and over.

98.4% of residents lived in urban areas, while 1.6% lived in rural areas.

There were 964 households in Okanogan, of which 30.5% had children under the age of 18 living in them. Of all households, 37.8% were married-couple households, 22.0% were households with a male householder and no spouse or partner present, and 33.0% were households with a female householder and no spouse or partner present. About 34.3% of all households were made up of individuals and 16.1% had someone living alone who was 65 years of age or older.

There were 1,063 housing units, of which 9.3% were vacant. The homeowner vacancy rate was 2.6% and the rental vacancy rate was 7.1%.

Racial composition as of the 2020 census
Race	Number	Percent
White	1,716	72.1%
Black or African American	10	0.4%
American Indian and Alaska Native	157	6.6%
Asian	23	1.0%
Native Hawaiian and Other Pacific Islander	5	0.2%
Some other race	216	9.1%
Two or more races	252	10.6%
Hispanic or Latino (of any race)	359	15.1%

=== 2010 census ===
As of the 2010 census, there were 2,552 people, 983 households, and 619 families living in the city. The population density was 1,308.7 inhabitants per square mile (505.3/km^{2}). There were 1,051 housing units at an average density of 539.0 per square mile (208.1/km^{2}). The racial makeup of the city was 79.8% White, 0.5% African American, 7.9% Native American, 0.4% Asian, 0.2% Pacific Islander, 6.4% from other races, and 4.8% from two or more races. Hispanic or Latino of any race were 14.1% of the population.

There were 983 households, of which 32.6% had children under the age of 18 living with them, 40.6% were married couples living together, 15.8% had a female householder with no husband present, 6.6% had a male householder with no wife present, and 37.0% were non-families. 30.1% of all households were made up of individuals, and 11.4% had someone living alone who was 65 years of age or older. The average household size was 2.39 and the average family size was 2.91.

The median age in the city was 37.7 years. 24.2% of residents were under the age of 18; 10.1% were between the ages of 18 and 24; 24.3% were from 25 to 44; 26.6% were from 45 to 64; and 14.9% were 65 years of age or older. The gender makeup of the city was 50.7% male and 49.3% female.

=== 2000 census ===
As of the 2000 census, there were 2,484 people, 909 households, and 599 families living in the city. The population density was 1,354.8 people per square mile (524.1/km^{2}). There were 997 housing units at an average density of 543.8 per square mile (210.4/km^{2}). The racial makeup of the city was 80.60% White, 0.36% African American, 8.17% Native American, 0.40% Asian, 0.08% Pacific Islander, 6.64% from other races, and 3.74% from two or more races. Hispanic or Latino of any race were 10.10% of the population.

There were 909 households, out of which 37.1% had children under the age of 18 living with them, 48.1% were married couples living together, 13.4% had a female householder with no husband present, and 34.0% were non-families. 28.7% of all households were made up of individuals, and 10.9% had someone living alone who was 65 years of age or older. The average household size was 2.49 and the average family size was 3.06.

In the city, the population was spread out, with 27.7% under the age of 18, 8.9% from 18 to 24, 26.4% from 25 to 44, 21.9% from 45 to 64, and 15.1% who were 65 years of age or older. The median age was 37 years. For every 100 females, there were 99.7 males. For every 100 females age 18 and over, there were 94.6 males.

The median income for a household in the city was $26,994, and the median income for a family was $33,947. Males had a median income of $31,143 versus $20,822 for females. The per capita income for the city was $13,849. About 20.2% of families and 24.3% of the population were below the poverty line, including 31.9% of those under age 18 and 16.3% of those age 65 or over.

== Education ==
The city is served by the Okanogan School District.

== Sister city ==
Okanogan has one Sister City:

- Keremeos, British Columbia, Canada
