= Atlanta, Missouri =

- City
- Location in Macon County and the state of Missouri
- Coordinates: 39°53′55″N 92°28′48″W
- Country: United States
- State: Missouri
- County: Macon

Government
  - Mayor: Lisa Bender

Area
  - Total: 0.34 sq mi (0.89 km^{2})
  - Land: 0.34 sq mi (0.89 km^{2})
  - Water: 0 sq mi (0.00 km^{2})
- Elevation: 906 ft (276 m)

Population (2020)
  - Total: 379
  - Density: 1,106.9/sq mi (427.37/km^{2})
- Time zone: UTC-6 (Central (CST))
  - Summer (DST): UTC-5 (CDT)
- ZIP Code: 63530
- Area code: 660
- FIPS code: 29-02422
- GNIS feature ID: 2394015

Atlanta is a city in Macon County, Missouri, United States. The population was 379 at the 2020 census.

== History ==
Atlanta was platted in 1858. The community was named after Atlanta, Georgia. A post office called Atlanta has been in operation since 1868.

On May 6, 1935, TWA Flight 6, a TWA DC-2 en route from Los Angeles, California, to Washington, D.C., became lost in heavy fog near Atlanta. Running out of fuel, the pilot attempted an emergency landing but crashed, which killed four and injured several others. Among the dead was Senator Bronson Cutting of New Mexico. The crash made national headlines and prompted Congress to commission the Copeland Committee report on air traffic safety.

During the summer of 2022, Atlanta City Hall was relocated. Due to circumstances, the former Atlanta Methodist Church became available and was acquired by the city, where it remains to this day. The former City Hall has since been converted into a local memorial to a previous mayor, Owen L. "Woody" Woodward.

== Geography ==
Atlanta is in north-eastern Macon County. U.S. Route 63 passes just east of the city limits, leading north 9 miles (14 km) to La Plata and south 11 miles (18 km) to Macon, the county seat.

Getting here: Atlanta is reachable by Amtrak to the nearby La Plata Station on the Southwest Chief, a line stretching from Chicago to Los Angeles. Amtrak is also available from Quincy (one hour commute) to Chicago. Flights to the area are available from Chicago's O'Hare to Kirksville on Contour Airlines or to Quincy on Southern Airways. Longer commutes are available: Columbia, MO connects to Dallas Fort Worth and O'Hare. St. Louis and Kansas City airports are around 2.5 hours away.

According to the U.S. Census Bureau, Atlanta has a total area of 0.34 square miles (0.88 km^{2}), of which 0.001 square miles (0.6 acres), or 0.29%, are water. The city sits on a ridge which drains west toward Long Branch and east toward the Middle Fork of the Salt River. Long Branch is a south-flowing tributary of the Little Chariton River, leading south to the Missouri River, while the Salt River is an east-flowing direct tributary of the Mississippi.

== Demographics ==
Historical population
Census	Pop.	Note	%±
1910	523		—
1920	536		2.5%
1930	497		−7.3%
1940	507		2.0%
1950	438		−13.6%
1960	386		−11.9%
1970	377		−2.3%
1980	441		17.0%
1990	411		−6.8%
2000	450		9.5%
2010	385		−14.4%
2020	379		−1.6%
2022 (est.)	373		−1.6%
U.S. Decennial Census

=== 2020 census ===
As of the 2020 census there are 373 people.

=== 2010 census ===
As of the census of 2010, there were 385 people, 157 households, and 104 families residing in the city. The population density was 1,132.4 inhabitants per square mile (437.2/km^{2}). There were 189 housing units at an average density of 555.9 per square mile (214.6/km^{2}). The racial makeup of the city was 97.1% White, 0.3% African American, 0.5% Native American, and 2.1% from two or more races. Hispanic or Latino of any race were 0.3% of the population.

There were 157 households, of which 38.2% had children under the age of 18 living with them, 45.2% were married couples living together, 14.6% had a female householder with no husband present, 6.4% had a male householder with no wife present, and 33.8% were non-families. 30.6% of all households were made up of individuals, and 14.7% had someone living alone who was 65 years of age or older. The average household size was 2.45 and the average family size was 2.99.

The median age in the city was 37.9 years. 28.1% of residents were under the age of 18; 5.1% were between the ages of 18 and 24; 28.6% were from 25 to 44; 22.1% were from 45 to 64; and 16.1% were 65 years of age or older. The gender makeup of the city was 47.3% male and 52.7% female.

=== 2000 census ===
As of the census of 2000, there were 450 people, 173 households, and 129 families residing in the city. The population density was 1,314.2 inhabitants per square mile (507.4/km^{2}). There were 199 housing units at an average density of 581.2 per square mile (224.4/km^{2}). The racial makeup of the city was 99.11% White, 0.22% Native American, and 0.67% from two or more races.

There were 173 households, out of which 39.3% had children under the age of 18 living with them, 56.1% were married couples living together, 15.6% had a female householder with no husband present, and 25.4% were non-families. 23.1% of all households were made up of individuals, and 8.7% had someone living alone who was 65 years of age or older. The average household size was 2.60 and the average family size was 3.03.

In the city the population was spread out, with 30.7% under the age of 18, 7.8% from 18 to 24, 30.7% from 25 to 44, 18.9% from 45 to 64, and 12.0% who were 65 years of age or older. The median age was 31 years. For every 100 females there were 90.7 males. For every 100 females age 18 and over, there were 84.6 males.

The median income for a household in the city was $33,571, and the median income for a family was $39,271. Males had a median income of $25,673 versus $16,875 for females. The per capita income for the city was $14,940. About 7.3% of families and 9.1% of the population were below the poverty line, including 8.5% of those under age 18 and 11.5% of those age 65 or over.

== Sports and external affiliations ==
Atlanta residents are known for their love for their local "Hornets" sports teams and the local school colors of blue and white. Atlanta's local high school is affiliated with MSHSAA. In 1998, the Atlanta Lady Hornets won first in state in basketball, with a record of 31–0. In 2015, the Hornets lost their state game coming into second place in the 1-A class.

Spring Baseball
Year	Record	PPG	OP PPG
2022	11 - 0	10	3.9
2021	8 - 5	10	5.1
2020	(No Season)	(No Season)	(No Season)
2019	6 - 6	6.3	4.9
2018	6 - 6	6.2	5.3
2017	1 - 12	2.3	10.8
2016	1 - 9	3.9	11.9
2015*	14 - 4	7.1	3.8
2014	13 - 1	9.4	2.4
2013	9 - 5	7.4	3.8
2012	13 - 9	7.1	4.3
2011	10 - 9	9.7	8.2
2010	10 - 7	6.2	5.6
2009	6 - 9	6.2	7.7

Fall Baseball
Years	Record	PPG	OPP PG
2022^			
2021	12 - 5	11.5	3.8
2020	5 - 7	6.7	5.6
2019	10 - 4	7.7	4.1
2018	4 - 8	4.8	8.3
2017	8 - 9	6.9	7.5
2016	3 - 9	6.3	12.3
2015	4 - 11	6.3	11.3
2014	17 - 0	10	2.4
2013	13 - 2	9.5	1.3
2012	9 - 7	8.9	5.9

Fall Softball
Year	Record	PPG	OPP PG
2021	22 - 4	7.9	2
2020	15 - 5	8.8	2.7
2019	20 - 4	9.6	1.8
2018	13 - 3	11.9	1.8
2017	20 - 4	10.5	2.3
2016	4 - 13	7	13.9
2015	22 - 4	8	2.3
2014	11 - 8	8.9	8.5
2013	11 - 13	7.5	8
2012	4 - 11	5.6	10

- (*) Denotes state-appearance - (^) Denotes current season

== Churches ==
The Atlanta community is home to several churches, including small country churches outside of city limits. There are two churches inside the City of Atlanta - Atlanta Christian Church and Atlanta First Baptist Church.

== Annual events ==
The community hosts the "Atlanta Homecoming" every last full weekend in June in the town center, Atterberry Park.

Other downtown activities include the annual "Big Wheels" event hosted by the Atlanta PTO every September and an egg hunt hosted by Crossroads Christian Church of Macon, the Saturday before Easter every year.

Sports activities at the school include a Little Dribblers Tournament hosted by the PTO in March and the Pee Wee Baseball Tournament held in May.

== Education ==
The local school district, Atlanta C-3 school district averages about 200 students, K-12, annually. In 2007, the district was recognized as a National Blue Ribbon School by the United States Department of Education.

In 2019, Atlanta Elementary was ranked 7th out of 1,039 elementary schools in Missouri, based on Missouri's assessment program test scores.

The Home Pioneer 4-H Club is based in Atlanta and currently has 90 members, making it one of the largest 4-H clubs in Missouri.

== Recreation ==
Visitors to the area include hunters seeking whitetail deer and turkey.

There is a plethora of areas and parks that are protected by the Missouri Department of Conservation.

== Notable people ==
- Milton Romjue (1874–1968), Democrat who served in the United States Congress. He attended local schools and lived east of the Love Lake area.
