= TWA Flight 358 =

1971 aircraft hijacking

Hijacking
- Date: 11 June 1971
- Summary: Hijacking
- Site: Chicago, Illinois, Airspace, and New York City, New York, United States
- Operator: Trans World Airlines
- Flight origin: O'Hare International Airport, Chicago
- Destination: John F. Kennedy International Airport, New York
- Occupants: 26
- Fatalities: 1
- Injuries: 1 (hijacker)

Trans World Airlines Flight 358 (TWA Flight 358) was a domestic flight traveling from Chicago's O'Hare International Airport to New York City's John F. Kennedy International Airport. On June 11, 1971, a ticketless man named Gregory White boarded the Boeing 727 aircraft using force and demanded a machine gun, $75,000, and to be flown to North Vietnam. After murdering a passenger, White was soon apprehended at the John F. Kennedy International Airport by FBI agents, wounded, and arrested. It was the first attempted hijacking in the United States that resulted in a passenger fatality.

== Hijacking Events ==
On June 11, 1971, Gregory White bypassed security at O'Hare International Airport and entered onto the tarmac, preparing to board TWA Flight 358. When flight attendant Cathy Culver asked White to present his boarding ticket, White took out a pistol and held it to Culver's head. He then entered the aircraft and demanded to be flown to North Vietnam, in addition to demanding a machine gun and $75,000.

The pilot Captain Robert Elder and co-pilot Ronald Dupuis contacted TWA Operations for help. Passengers were allowed to exit the aircraft, and while they were doing so, U.S. Deputy Marshal Joseph Zito boarded by climbing a rope into a window in the cockpit. One passenger, Howard Franks, reentered the aircraft after forgetting an item and was shot dead by White. Captain Robert Elder dragged Franks' body back to the terminal, returned to the aircraft, and negotiated with the hijacker to stop at John F. Kennedy International Airport for a larger aircraft better suited for travel to North Vietnam.

While en route to New York, Zito gave an extra firearm to Don Welsheimer, the flight engineer, and both exchanged gunfire between the cockpit and the cabin with the hijacker. Once on the ground in New York, an FBI agent shot White in the arm and White surrendered. The pilots, flight engineer, flight attendant, and Deputy Marshal then escaped down an escape slide. White followed and was arrested and taken to Queens General Hospital. Later, White was deemed too incompetent for trial and was committed to a state mental hospital in Chester, Illinois.
