= United States government role in civil aviation =

The Air Commerce Act of 1926 created an Aeronautic Branch of the United States Department of Commerce. Its functions included testing and licensing of pilots, certification of aircraft and investigation of accidents.

In 1934, the Aeronautics Branch was renamed the Bureau of Air Commerce, to reflect the growing importance of commercial flying. It was subsequently divided into two authorities: the Civil Aeronautics Administration (CAA), concerned with air traffic control, and the Civil Aeronautics Board (CAB), concerned with safety regulations and accident investigation. Under the Federal Aviation Act of 1958, the CAA's powers were transferred to a new independent body, the Federal Aviation Administration (FAA). In the same year, the National Aeronautics and Space Administration (NASA) was created after the Soviet Union’s launch of the first artificial satellite. The accident investigation powers of the CAB were transferred to the new National Transportation Safety Board in 1967, at the same time that the United States Department of Transportation was created.

In response to the September 11 attacks, the federal government launched the Transportation Security Administration with broad powers to protect air travel and other transportation modes against criminal activity.

== National Advisory Committee for Aeronautics and airmail ==
European enthusiasm for air power was sparked by an arms race and then by the outbreak of World War I in 1914. During the following year, the United States Congress took a step toward revitalizing American aviation by establishing the National Advisory Committee for Aeronautics (NACA), an organization dedicated to the science of flight.

Upon entering World War I in 1917, the United States government mobilized the nation's economy, with results that included an expansion of the small aviation manufacturing industry. Before the end of the conflict, Congress voted funds for an innovative postal program that would serve as a model for commercial air operations. With initial help from the U.S. Army, the Post Office in 1918 initiated an intercity airmail route. The subsequent achievements of the Air Mail Service included the establishment of a transcontinental route and the development of airway lighting.

In 1925, the Airmail Act of 1925 authorized the Post Office to contract with private airlines to transport mail. The Airmail Act created American commercial aviation and several of today's airlines were formed to carry airmail in the late 1920s (including Trans World Airlines, Northwest Airlines, and United Airlines).

== Air Commerce Act ==
Air Commerce Act
- Other short titles: Air Commerce Act of 1926
- Long title: An Act To encourage and regulate the use of aircraft in commerce, and for other purposes
- Enacted by: the 69th United States Congress

Citations
- Public law: Pub. L. 69–254
- Statutes at Large: 44 Stat. 568

Codification
- Titles amended: 49

Legislative history
- Introduced in the Senate as S. 41; Signed into law by President Calvin Coolidge on May 20, 1926

Major amendments
- Civil Aeronautics Act of 1938

Aviation in the United States was not regulated during the early 20th century. A succession of accidents during the pre-war exhibition era (1910–16) and barnstorming decade of the 1920s gave way to early forms of federal regulation intended to instill public confidence in the safety of air transportation. As claimed by the Aircraft Year Book, barnstormers caused 66% of fatal accidents during 1924. Opponents of this view included those who distrusted government interference or wished to leave any such regulation to state authorities. Barnstorming accidents that led to such regulations during this period are accurately depicted in the 1975 film The Great Waldo Pepper.

At the urging of the aviation industry, that believed the airplane could not reach its full commercial potential without federal action to improve and maintain safety standards, President Calvin Coolidge appointed a board to investigate the issue. The board's report favored federal safety regulation. To that end, the Air Commerce Act became law on May 20, 1926. The act was sponsored by Rep. Laurence H. Watres, and subsequently referred to as the Watres Act.

The Act created an Aeronautic Branch assigned to the United States Department of Commerce, and vested that entity with regulatory powers to ensure a degree of civil air safety. Among these powers were: testing and licensing pilots, issuing certificates to guarantee the airworthiness of aircraft, making and enforcing safety rules, certificating aircraft, establishing airways, operating and maintaining aids to air navigation, and investigating accidents and incidents in aviation. The first head of the Branch was William P. MacCracken, Jr. High visibility accidents such as the 1931 Transcontinental & Western Air Fokker F-10 crash and the 1935 crash of TWA Flight 6 continued to make headlines.

In fulfilling its civil aviation responsibilities, the Department of Commerce initially concentrated on functions such as safety rulemaking and the certification of pilots and aircraft. It took over the building and operation of the nation's system of lighted airways, a task begun by the Post Office Department. The Department of Commerce improved aeronautical radio communications, and introduced radio beacons as an effective aid to air navigation.

In 1934, the Aeronautics Branch was renamed the Bureau of Air Commerce. As commercial aviation grew, the Bureau encouraged airlines to establish three centers (Newark, New Jersey; Cleveland, Ohio; and Chicago, Illinois) to provide air traffic control in airways. In 1936, the Bureau itself took over the centers and began to expand the ATC system. Pioneer air traffic controllers resorted to using maps, blackboards, and calculations to perform their new roles, making sure aircraft traveling along designated routes did not collide.

== Bureau of Air Commerce ==
The Department of Commerce created an Aeronautics Branch in 1926. The first head of this organization was William P. MacCracken, Jr. (first recipient of its pilot certification license), whose approach to regulation included consultation and cooperation with industry. A major challenge facing MacCracken was to enlarge and improve the nation's air navigation system. The Aeronautics Branch took over the Post Office's task of building airway light beacons, and in 1928 introduced a new navigation beacon system known as the low frequency radio range, or the "Four Course Radio Range". The branch also built additional airway communications stations to encourage broader use of aeronautical radio and combat adverse weather.

NACA began its own aeronautics research undertaking in 1920. In 1928, having created one of the first wind tunnels years earlier, the organization's work with the latter produced a new type of engine cowling with much less drag than former designs.

Under President Franklin D. Roosevelt, the Aeronautics Branch cooperated with public works agencies on projects that represented an early form of federal aid to airports. The Branch was restructured and in 1934 received a new name, the Bureau of Air Commerce. Eugene Luther Vidal, son-in-law of Senator Thomas Gore became its first director. Vidal resigned on February 28, 1937, and was replaced by Fred D. Fagg, Jr. Fagg reorganized the bureau, but retired in April 1938, being replaced by Hindenburg crash investigator Denis Mulligan.

The year 1934 also saw a crisis over airmail contracts that former Postmaster General W.F. Brown had used to strengthen the airline route structure. In the Air Mail scandal, Senate investigators charged that Brown's methods had been illegal, and President Roosevelt canceled the contracts. In 1935 the BAC encouraged a group of airlines to establish the first three centers (Newark, New Jersey; Cleveland, Ohio; and Chicago, Illinois) for providing air traffic control along the airways, the following year taking over the centers itself and expanding the traffic control system.

== Civil Aeronautics Authority ==
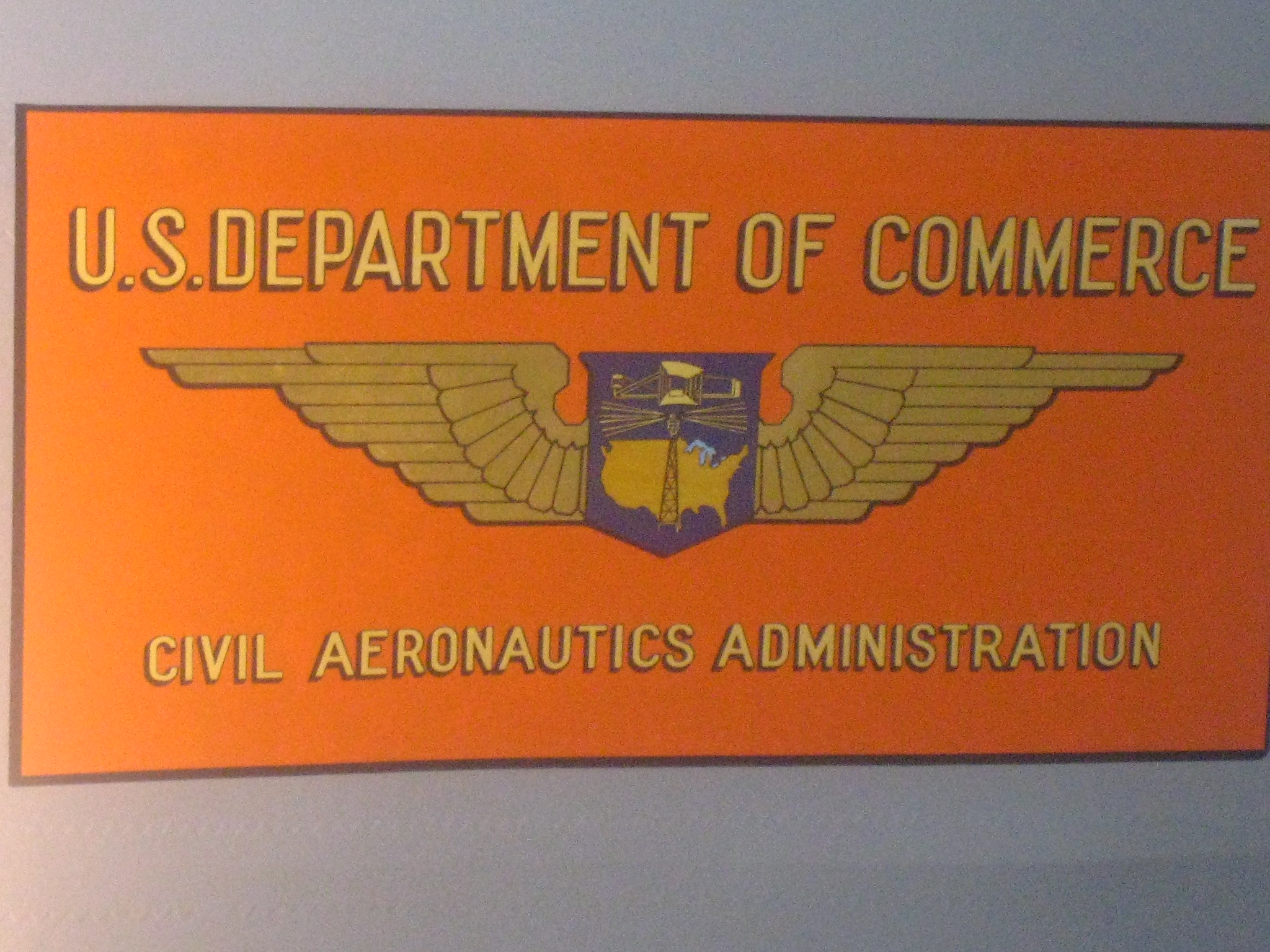
Logo on side of a test aircraft

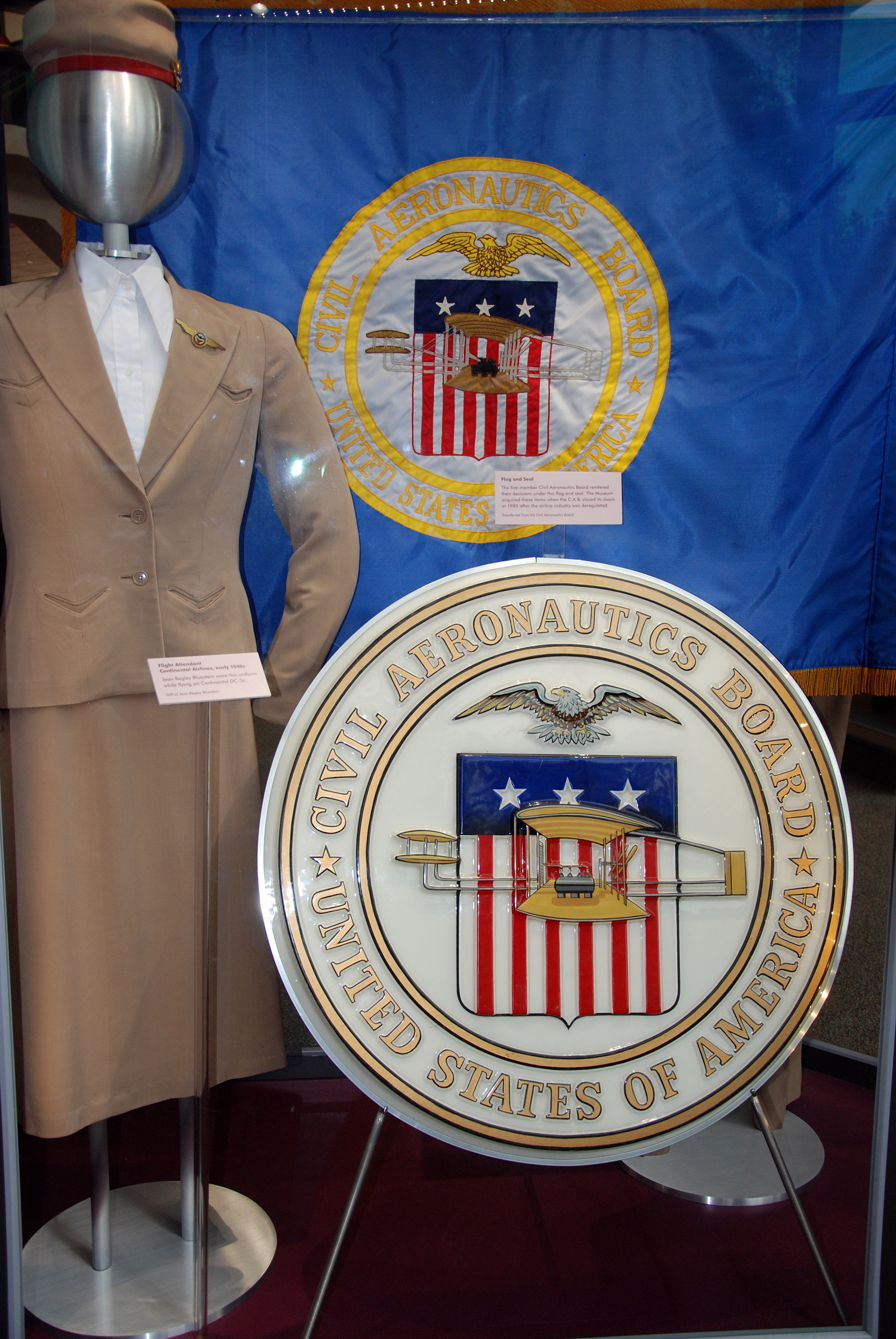
Seal and flag of the defunct Civil Aeronautics Board on display in the National Air and Space Museum

In 1938, the Civil Aeronautics Act transferred federal responsibilities for non-military aviation from the Bureau of Air Commerce to a new, independent agency, the Civil Aeronautics Authority. The legislation also gave the authority the power to regulate airline fares and to determine the routes that air carriers would serve.

=== Civil Aeronautics Administration and Civil Aeronautics Board ===
In 1940, President Franklin D. Roosevelt split the Civil Aeronautics Authority into two agencies, the Civil Aeronautics Administration and a five-member Civil Aeronautics Board. The CAA was responsible for air traffic control, safety programs, and airway development. The CAB was entrusted with safety rulemaking, accident investigation, and economic regulation of the airlines. Although both organizations were housed in the Department of Commerce, the CAB functioned independently. When a Douglas DC-3A crashed shortly after departing Washington, DC, on August 31, 1940, the CAB had their first major investigation, that of the Lovettsville air disaster, setting the pattern for subsequent accident investigations.

In 1942, President Roosevelt appointed L. Welch Pogue as Chairman of the Civil Aeronautics Board. Pogue served as Chairman until 1946. During his tenure he helped strike down a plan for a single world airline.

After World War II began in Europe, the CAA launched the Civilian Pilot Training Program to provide new pilots. On the eve of America's entry into the conflict, the agency began to take over operation of airport control towers, a role that eventually became permanent. During the war, the CAA also greatly enlarged its en route air traffic control system. In 1944, the United States hosted a conference in Chicago that led to the establishment of the International Civil Aviation Organization and set the framework for future aviation diplomacy. In 1946, Congress gave the CAA the task of administering a federal-aid airport program aimed exclusively at promoting development of the United States' civil airports.

This included the establishment of semi-permanent colonies in remote, U.S.-owned territories, such as the Palmyra Atoll, where beginning in 1948, nearly 100 men, women, and children were sent to live and work. They occupied the facilities of what had been a Navy refueling base during World War II, manning its radio station and maintaining the 6,000-foot runway. Strangely, this community was dispersed in 1949, and while the exact reasons why are unclear, it was likely because the benefits of operating the facilities did not outweigh the cost of providing for the colony members.

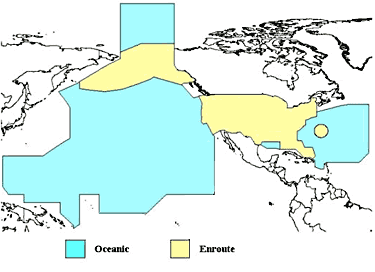
The FAA provides air traffic control services over US territory as well as over international waters where it has been delegated such authority by the ICAO. This map depicts overflight fee regions. Yellow (enroute) covers land territory, excluding Hawaii and some island territories but including most of the Bering Sea as well as Bermuda and the Bahamas (the former a British overseas territory and the latter a sovereign country, both where the FAA provides high-altitude ATC service). The blue regions are where the US provides oceanic ATC services over international waters (Hawaii, some US island territories, & some small, foreign island nations/territories where the US provides high-altitude ATC service are included in this region).

== Federal Aviation Administration and NASA ==
Several mid-air collisions occurred during the latter half of the 20th century, such as the 1956 Grand Canyon mid-air collision, the first time more than 100 people were killed. Jet travel was nascent at this time, prompting the passage of the Federal Aviation Act of 1958. The legislation gave the CAA's functions to a new independent body, the Federal Aviation Agency. The act transferred safety rulemaking from CAB to the new FAA (the CAB continued), and also made the FAA responsible for a common civil-military system of air navigation and air traffic control. The FAA's first administrator, Elwood R. Quesada, was a former U.S. Air Force Lt. General who commanded the early tactical air forces of the Ninth Air Force in Europe in World War II, and served as an advisor to President Dwight D. Eisenhower.

The same year witnessed the transformation of NACA into the National Aeronautics and Space Administration (NASA) in the wake of the Soviet Union's launch of the first artificial satellite, Sputnik. NASA assumed NACA's role of aeronautical research.

== Department of Transportation, NTSB and TSA ==
The accident investigation powers of the Civil Aeronautics Board were transferred to the new National Transportation Safety Board in 1967, at the same time that the United States Department of Transportation was created. The CAB's remaining authority was economic regulation of commercial air transportation. The Airline Deregulation Act of 1978 phased out these controls, resulting in the elimination of the CAB at the end of 1984, with most residual powers transferred to the DOT.

The September 11, 2001 attacks challenged the air transportation system by presenting a new type of terrorist attack: hijacked airliners used for terrorist attacks. The government's response included the Aviation and Transportation Security Act, enacted that November, that established a new DOT organization: the Transportation Security Administration. It received broad powers to protect air travel and other transportation modes against criminal activity.

In 2013, the FAA partnered with the rotorcraft industry to form the U.S. Helicopter Safety Team (USHST), a voluntary government-industry group tasked with reducing the civil helicopter fatal accident rate through data-driven safety analysis and recommendations.

In 2013, the FAA partnered with the rotorcraft industry to form the U.S. Helicopter Safety Team (USHST), a voluntary government-industry group tasked with reducing the civil helicopter fatal accident rate through data-driven safety analysis and recommendations.
