= 165th Air Support Operations Squadron =

- Active: 1988–present
- Country: United States
- Allegiance: Georgia
- Branch: Air National Guard, United States Air Force
- Type: Combat Support
- Role: Close Air Support Operations
- Part of: 165th Airlift Wing; Georgia Air National Guard; Air Combat Command
- Garrison/HQ: Savannah Air National Guard Base
- Mottos: "The Strong Shall Stand, The Weak Will Fall By The Wayside!" "Rock, Shield, and Sword"
- Decorations: Air Force Meritorious Unit Award

Insignia
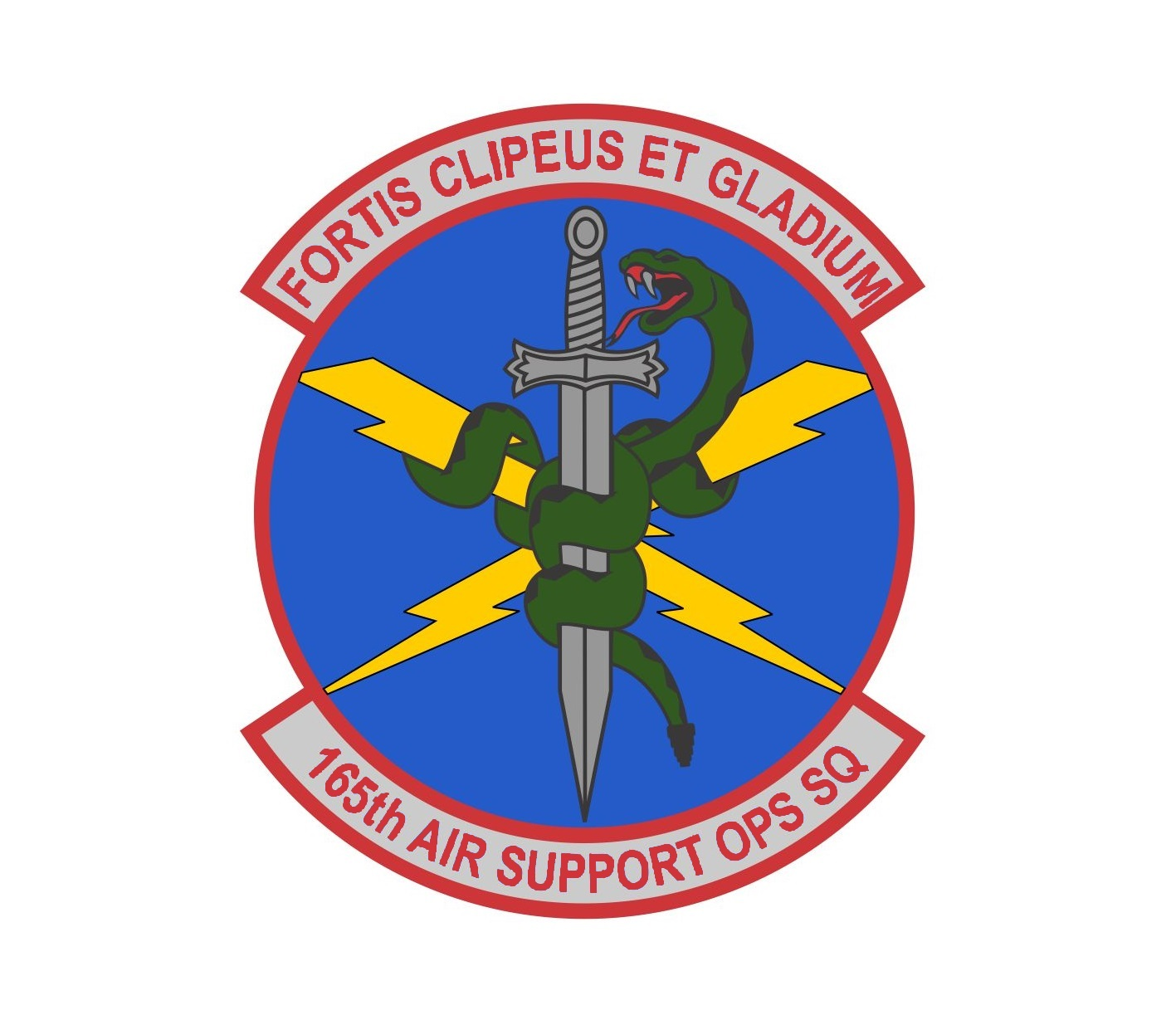
- 165th Air Support Operations Squadron emblem

The 165th Air Support Operations Squadron (165 ASOS) is a combat support and geographically separated unit of the 165th Airlift Wing (AW) in the Georgia Air National Guard. The 165 ASOS is located at Savannah-Hilton Head International Airport, in the U.S. state of Georgia. The 165 ASOS falls under jurisdiction of Air Combat Command (ACC) along with other Tactical Air Control Party (TACP) squadrons, whereas the 165 AW falls under the jurisdiction of Air Mobility Command. The 165 ASOS provides TACP members; Air Liaison Officer (ALO) members; Intelligence, Surveillance, and Reconnaissance Liaison Officer (ISRLO) members; and support personnel to aligned units in support of combat operations.

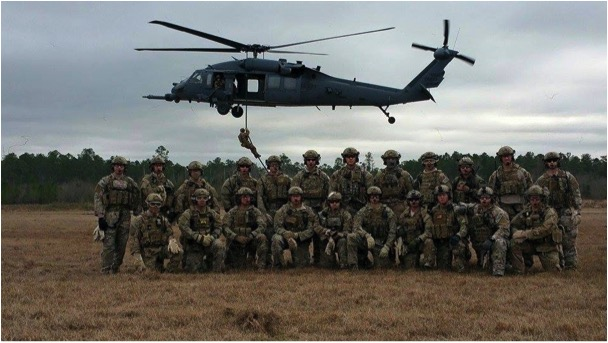

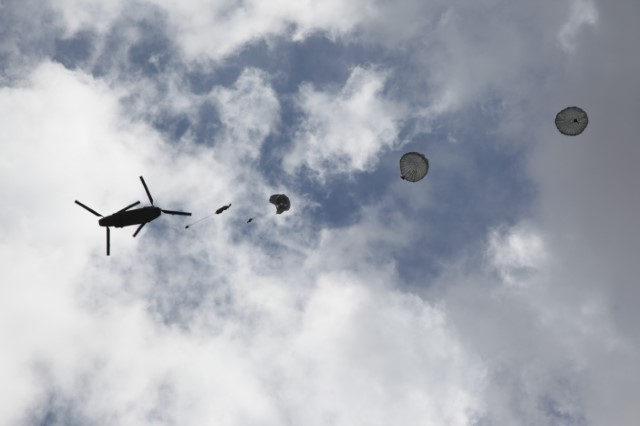

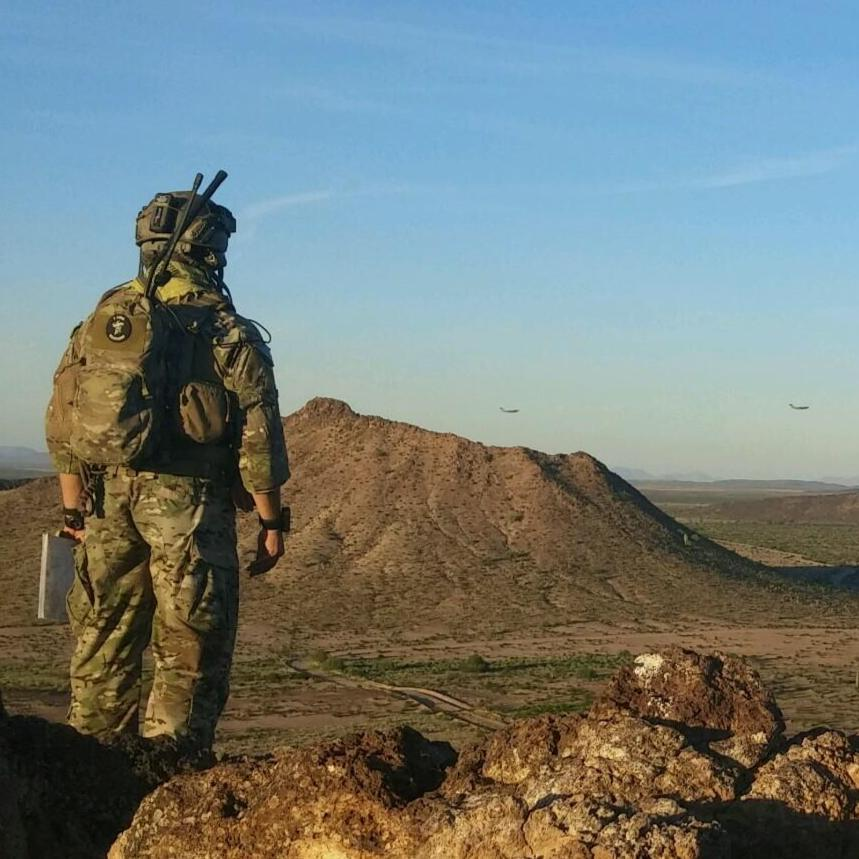

== Mission ==
The mission of the 165 ASOS is to provide combat mission ready TACP to aligned and supported units. The 165 ASOS provides support to the 48th Infantry Brigade Combat Team (IBCT) of the Georgia Army National Guard, the 53rd IBCT of the Florida Army National Guard, the 29th Infantry Division (ID), and augments any active duty conventional and special operations units. TACP specialist members of the 165 ASOS become fully trained and certified Joint Terminal Attack Controllers (JTACs), allowing them to provide terminal attack guidance of fixed and rotary wing attack aircraft. They also deploy with, advise, and assist joint force commanders in planning, requesting, coordinating and controlling, close air support, reconnaissance, and tactical airlift missions.

As a unit of the Georgia National Guard, the 165 ASOS also provides domestic support capabilities to the Governor of Georgia, and the greater region. Members are capable of responding to natural disasters and provide search and rescue operations, preservation of property, protection of life, public safety, maintenance of vital public services, logistic support, and manpower to meet any emergency relief support missions that arise.

== History ==
On 15 September 1988 the federal government recognized the 111th Tactical Control Party Flight. The unit was first located at the Jekyll Island Airport, but moved to Brunswick, Georgia in January 1998 and was designated the 165 ASOS. It has undergone three separate conversions and held residence in five different places. The unit received a new facility at its current location in Garden City, Georgia, just east of Savannah on 10 October 2012. The 165 ASOS has been awarded five Air Force Outstanding Unit Awards for meritorious achievement.

== Operations ==
The unit was first mobilized during Desert Storm in 1991. Following 9/11, members of the 165 ASOS have been deployed overseas supporting combat operations every year since 2002, except in 2013. Members have supported the 48th IBCT during Operation Iraqi Freedom (OIF) and Operation Enduring Freedom (OEF) (Afghanistan), and the 53rd IBCT in AFRICOM. Members have also supported numerous other groups in Special Operations Command, Combined Joint Task Force - Horn of Africa for Operation Octave Shield, and in South America. Additionally, the 165 ASOS has supported the 1st Cavalry Division; the 2nd, 3rd, and 4th IDs; the 82nd Airborne; the 101st Airborne; the 37th IBCT; and 1st Armored Division (AD).

The 165 ASOS stood up a fully operational Small Unmanned Aerial Systems (SUAS) program in 2015. Its program is the largest SUAS program of conventional ASOS units in the United States Air Force and Air National Guard.

The 165 ASOS has also played a role in support of domestic operations. During the aftermath of Hurricane Katrina, members deployed to New Orleans, set up communications, and conducted search and rescue operations. In 2007, thirty members of the squadron helped authorities conduct a weeklong search for a missing child in the Brunswick area. During severe winter ice storms in northern and eastern Georgia during 2014, the unit also responded and established a task force. This task force was able to clear downed trees, aided in the restoration of power and clearing of roads, and located and assisted stranded motorists. 165 ASOS members also assisted in moving families from homes without power to shelters throughout the area.

165 ASOS members conduct domestic training in a wide variety of specializations, and participate in exercises throughout the United States and world.

== See also ==
- Tactical Air Control Party
- Joint Terminal Attack Controller
- 165th Airlift Wing
