= 165 Squadron =

165 Squadron may refer to:

- 165 Squadron, Republic of Singapore Air Force
- No. 165 Squadron RAF, United Kingdom
- 165th Aero Squadron, Air Service, United States Army; see list of American aero squadrons
- 165th Airlift Squadron, United States Air Force
- 165th Air Support Operations Squadron, United States Air Force
- VA-165 (U.S. Navy)
- VMM-165, United States Marine Corps
