= 165th Airlift Wing =

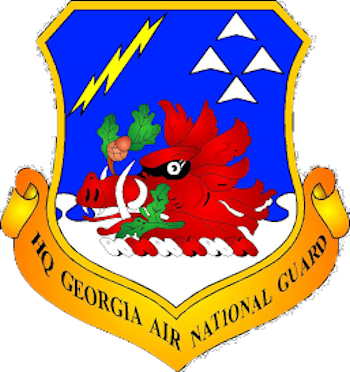
165th Airlift Wing

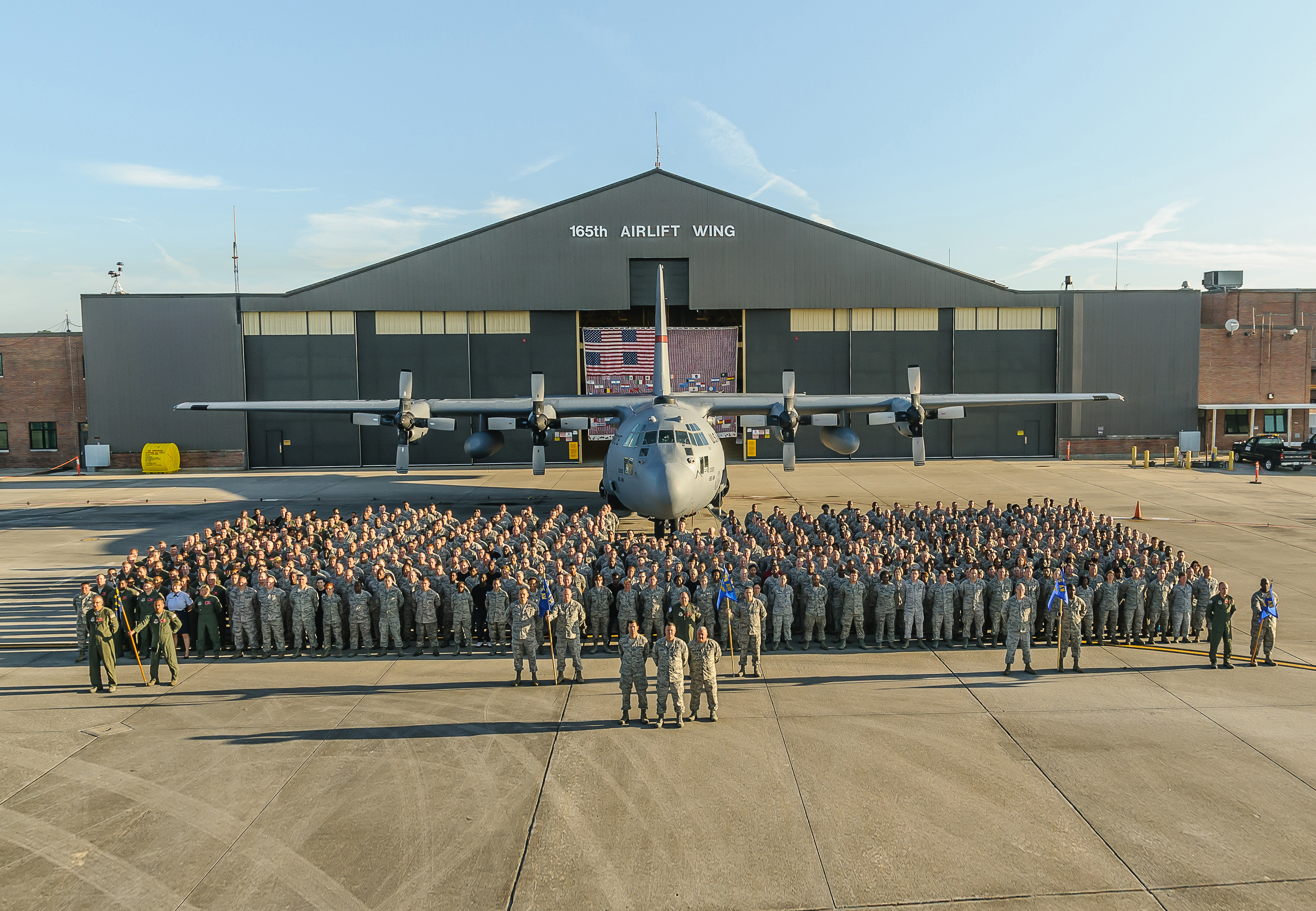
- Georgia National Guard airmen from the 165th Airlift Wing stand in front of a C-130H Hercules, 16 September 2012 at Savannah Air National Guard Base
- Active: 10 July 1958–present
- Country: United States
- Branch: Air National Guard
- Type: Wing
- Role: Airlift
- Size: 1000+
- Part of: Georgia Air National Guard
- Garrison/HQ: Savannah Air National Guard Base, Garden City, Georgia
- Decorations: Air Force Outstanding Unit Award

Insignia
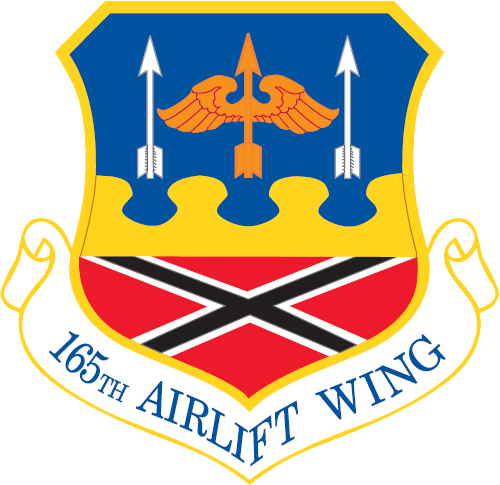
- 165th Airlift Wing emblem
- Tail stripe: Red, "Savannah" in white letters

The 165th Airlift Wing is a unit of the Georgia Air National Guard, stationed at Savannah Air National Guard Base, Georgia. If activated to federal service, the wing is gained by Air Mobility Command.

== Mission ==
The mission of the 165th Airlift Wing is to provide airlift of personnel, equipment and supplies worldwide.

== Units ==
The 165th Airlift Wing consists of the following units:

- 165th Operations Group

158th Airlift Squadron

- 165th Mission Support Group
- 165th Maintenance Group
- 165th Medical Group
- 224th Joint Communications Support Squadron
- 165th Air Support Operations Squadron
- 117th Air Control Squadron

== History ==
On 10 July 1958, the 158th Fighter-Interceptor Squadron of the Georgia ANG was authorized to expand to the size of a group, and the 165th Fighter Group was established by the National Guard Bureau. The 158th becaome the group's flying squadron. Other squadrons assigned into the group were the 165th Headquarters, 165th Material Squadron (Maintenance), 165th Air Base Squadron, and the 165th USAF Dispensary.

Gained by Air Defense Command, along with the activation of the group, the 158th was equipped with the North American F-86L Sabre, a day/night/all-weather aircraft designed to be integrated into the ADC SAGE interceptor direction and control system. In 1958, the 116th implemented the ADC Runway Alert Program, in which interceptors of the 158th were committed to a five-minute runway alert.

=== Airlift mission ===
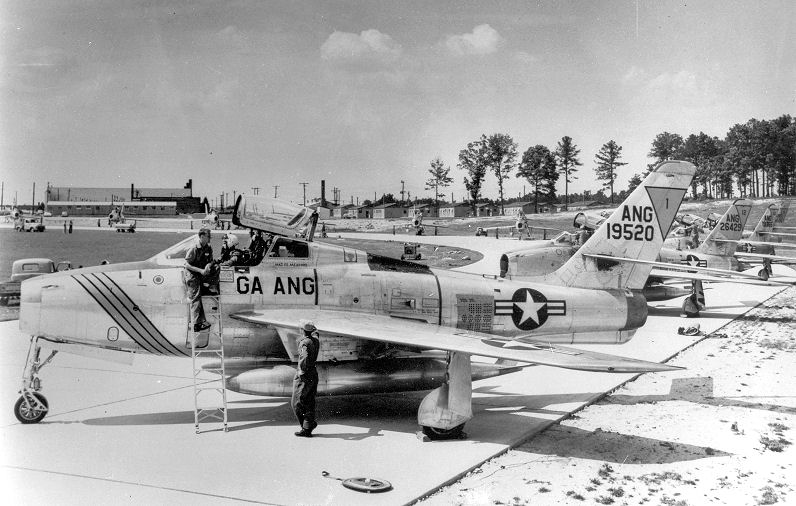
158th Fighter-Interceptor Squadron F-84Fs on alert at Travis Field, 1957

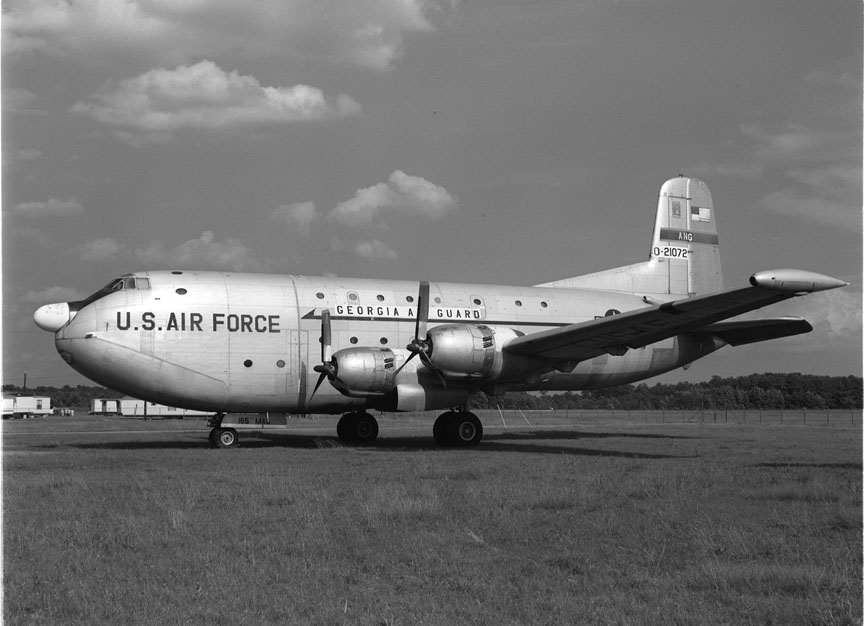
Georgia Air Guard Douglas C-124C Globemaster II

In 1962 the unit gave up its fighters and shifted to an airlift mission. The 158th Fighter Squadron became the 158th Air Transport Squadron on 1 July 1962 assigned to the 165th Air Transport Group. It traded in its Sabre interceptors for four-engined Boeing C-97 Stratofreighter transports. With air transportation recognized as a critical wartime need, the squadron was redesignated the 158th Air Transport Squadron, Heavy. The group was assigned to the MATS Eastern Transport Air Force, to fly long-distance transport missions, frequently sending aircraft to the Caribbean, Europe, Greenland, and the Middle East.

In 1966 MATS became the Military Airlift Command (MAC) and EASTAF became Twenty-First Air Force. The 165th upgraded to the Douglas C-124 Globemaster II strategic heavy airlifter in 1965. Due to the Vietnam War, missions were flown across the Pacific to Hawaii, Japan, the Philippines, South Vietnam, Okinawa and Thailand.

On 8 August 1975, the first of the Lockheed C-130E Hercules aircraft came to Savannah at the international airport to replace the older C-124's. While the C-124's were being retired from the Air Force inventory, the C-130s were arriving at the 165th Tactical Airlift Group.

The 158th received seven new C-130H Hercules aircraft directly from the Lockheed Factory manufactured for the unit during September and October 1981. On 15 April 1992, the unit was redesignated the 165th Airlift Group. On 1 October 1995, the unit received its current designation, the 165th Airlift Wing.

In 2005, the unit deployed aircraft and more than 100 personnel to Karshi-Khanabad Air Base, Uzbekistan, for 11 months. During this period, the unit airlifted more than 35,660 tons of cargo for U.S. troops in Afghanistan (just south of Uzbekistan), in Iraq, and elsewhere.

Since the beginning of operations in the Persian Gulf, the 165th Airlift Wing has been integrally involved in air operations. Several elements of the wing have been deployed throughout the region, with airmen serving in Uzbekistan, Turkey, Kuwait, Iraq and Afghanistan. In 2009, the 165th Airlift Wing was sent again to carry cargo for the War in Afghanistan (2001–2021).

=== Recent operations ===
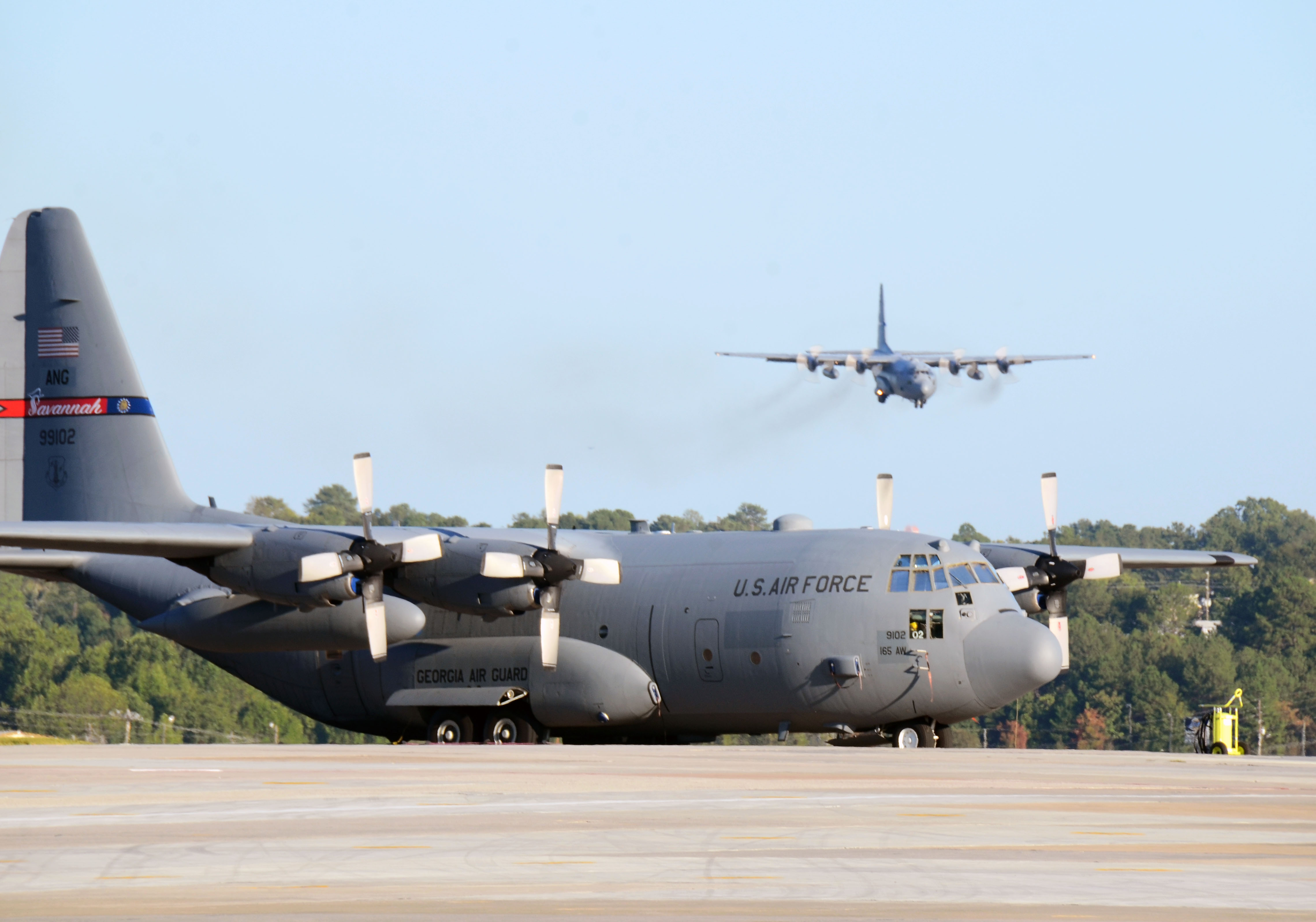
C-130H of 165th Airlift Wing, Georgia Air Guard, 2016

In January 2010, in response to the earthquake in Haiti, the 165th Airlift Wing placed a C-130 aircraft and crew on standby for the relief effort as ordered by the National Guard Bureau. The 165th quickly established a kitchen and dining area, one of fifteen in the burgeoning military sections of the city. On 25 January 2010, a small group of airmen deployed from the 165th Airlift Wing to Haiti in support of the Haitian relief efforts.

In January 2011, the last of six C-130H2 Hercules aircraft began a three-month stint at Bagram Air Base. This was the ninth time the 165th has deployed – to Iraq or Afghanistan – since 11 September 2001. Deploying with the aircraft were more than 150 Georgia Guard airmen, including all of the wing's operations division and more than 50 percent of its maintenance department.

During the summer of 2011, personnel from the 165th Airlift Wing assisted the Georgia Forestry Commission in fighting wildfires in southern Georgia.

From August 2012 until March 2013, 14 airmen from the 165th Airlift Wing's Aerial Port Squadron deployed to Camp Bastion, Afghanistan, managing passenger and cargo arrivals supporting the United States and the NATO-led International Security Assistance Force – principally British forces there.

=== Lineage ===
- Established as the 165th Fighter Group (Air Defense) and allotted to the Air National Guard in 1958

Extended federal recognition and activated, 10 July 1958
Redesignated 165th Air Transport Group on 1 July 1962
Redesignated 165th Military Airlift Group on 1 January 1966
Redesignated 165th Tactical Airlift Group on 8 August 1975
Redesignated 165th Airlift Group on 16 March 1992
Redesignated 165th Airlift Wing on 1 October 1995

=== Assignments ===
- Georgia Air National Guard, 10 July 1958 – present

Gained by: 35th Air Division, Air Defense Command
Gained by: Eastern Transport Air Force, Military Air Transport Service, 1 July 1962
Gained by: Twenty-First Air Force, Military Airlift Command, 3 January 1966
Gained by: Air Combat Command, 1 June 1992
Gained by: Air Mobility Command, 1 April 1997

=== Components ===
- 165th Operations Group, 1 October 1995 – Present
- 158th Fighter-Interceptor Squadron (later 158th Air Transport Squadron, 158th Military Airlift Squadron, 158th Tactical Airlift Squadron, 158th Airlift Squadron), 10 July 1958 – 1 October 1995

=== Stations ===
- Chatham Army Airfield, renamed Travis Field (now Savannah/Hilton Head International Airport), 10 July 1958

Designated: Savannah Air National Guard Base, 1991–Present

=== Aircraft ===
- North American F-86L Sabre, 1958–1962
- C-97F Stratofreighter, 1962–1965
- C-124C Globemaster II, 1965–1975
- C-130E Hercules, 1975–1981
- C-130H Hercules, 1981–2024
- C-130J Hercules, 2024–Present

=== Decorations ===
- Air Force Outstanding Unit Award
