= Pittsburgh International Airport =

Airport serving Pittsburgh, Pennsylvania, United States

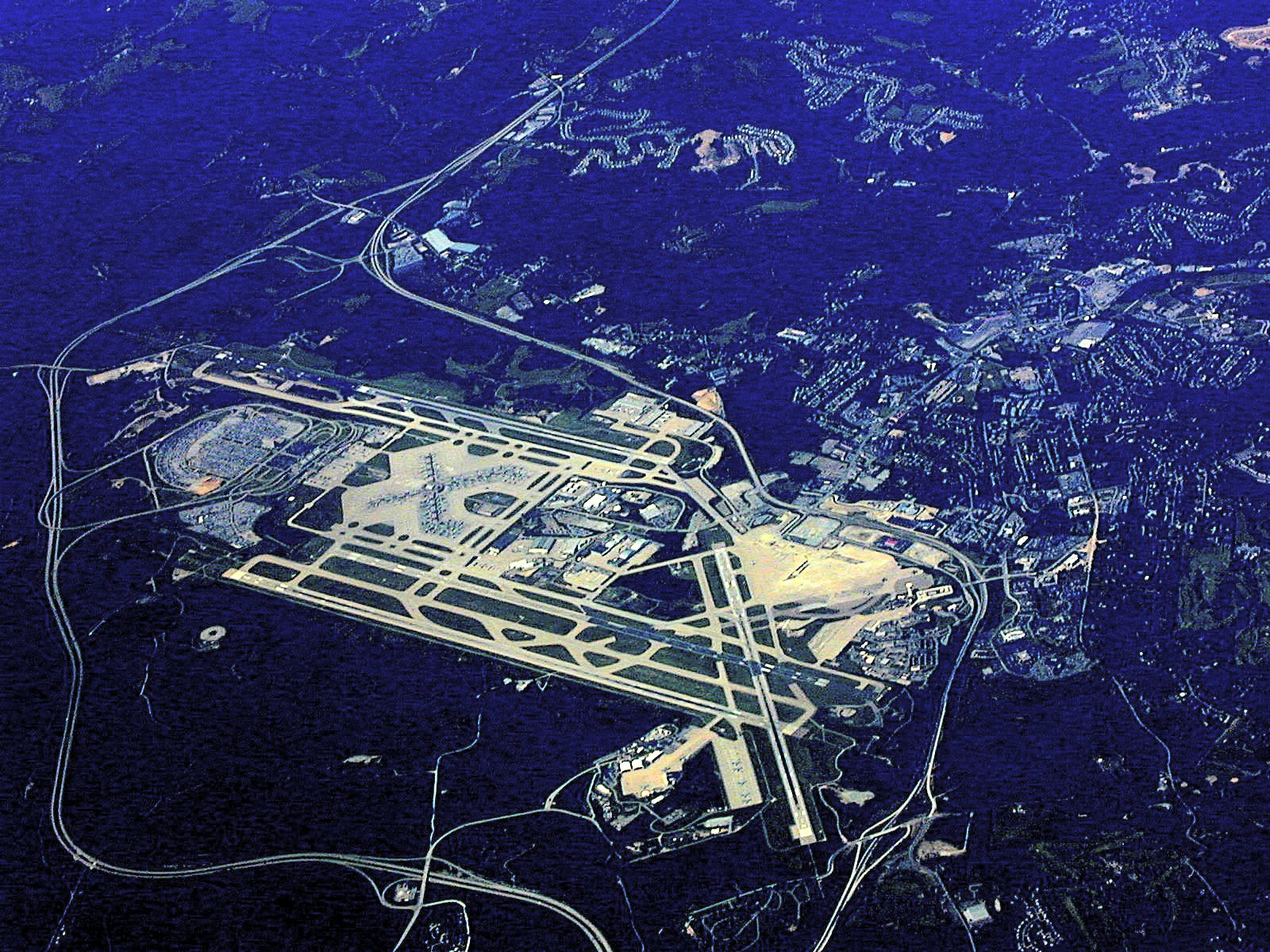
- IATA: PIT; ICAO: KPIT; FAA LID: PIT; WMO: 72520

Summary
- Airport type: Public / Military
- Owner/Operator: Allegheny County Airport Authority
- Serves: Pittsburgh metropolitan area
- Location: Findlay and Moon townships in Allegheny County, Pennsylvania, U.S.
- Opened: May 31, 1952; 74 years ago
- Hub for: Southern Airways Express
- Operating base for: Allegiant Air
- Elevation AMSL: 1,202 ft (366 m)
- Coordinates: 40.496°N 80.246°W
- Website: www.flypittsburgh.com

Maps
- FAA airport diagram
- Interactive map of Pittsburgh International Airport

Runways
Direction	Length		Surface
Direction	ft	m	Surface
10R/28L	11,500	3,505	Concrete
10C/28C	10,775	3,284	Asphalt/concrete
10L/28R	10,502	3,201	Asphalt/concrete
14/32	8,101	2,469	Concrete

Helipads
Number	Length		Surface
Number	ft	m	Surface
H1	60	18	Concrete

Statistics (2025)
- Total passengers: 9,848,440 ▼1.0%
- Total operations: 134,430
- Total cargo+mail (lbs.): 191,367,975
- Sources: FAA,

Pittsburgh International Airport (IATA: PIT, ICAO: KPIT, FAA LID: PIT)—originally Greater Pittsburgh Airport and later Greater Pittsburgh International Airport—is a civil-military international airport in Findlay Township and Moon Township, Pennsylvania, United States. About 17 miles (27 km) west of downtown Pittsburgh, it is the primary international airport serving the Greater Pittsburgh Region as well as adjacent areas in West Virginia and Ohio. The airport is owned and operated by the Allegheny County Airport Authority and offers passenger flights to destinations throughout North America, Caribbean, and Europe. PIT has four runways and covers 10,000 acres (40 km^{2}). PIT is the largest civil/public airport in terms of land area in the state of Pennsylvania. It also hosts a sizable United States Air Force base.

First opened in 1952, the airport was initially served by five airlines and became a small hub for Trans World Airlines for over two decades. The airport underwent a massive $1 billion rebuilding and expansion that was largely designed to US Airways' specification so it could become one of their major hubs. Completed in 1992, the new airport was one of the most innovative in the world, dubbed the "airport of the future" by The New York Times, and helped to pioneer modern airport design with its X-shape to reduce distance between gates, underground tram to transport passengers around the airport, and array of shopping options, all of which were cutting-edge at the time. Traffic peaked at 20 million passengers in the late 1990s, and USAir peaked with over 500 daily flights and 12,000 employees at the airport in 2001, and the airport was an important pillar of the Pittsburgh economy.

However, US Airways was unstable in the early 2000s, due in part to the downturn in air travel following the September 11 attacks. USAir declared chapter 11 bankruptcy twice in a row, and reduced operations in Pittsburgh beginning in 2004, eliminating thousands of jobs and nearly bankrupting the airport itself, which was built largely to suit US Airways' needs. However, US Airways' diminished capacity at Pittsburgh opened the door for other airlines to expand operations and better serve local Pittsburgh-area passengers rather than focus on connecting passengers. The airport experienced a resurgence in the 2010s, doubling the number of carriers to 16 as the Allegheny County Airport Authority has aggressively courted airlines and lobbied for new passenger routes. Southwest Airlines has increased its presence at the airport in recent years, overtaking American Airlines (which US Airways merged with) as the largest carrier in terms of passengers. The airport is also a hub for regional carrier Southern Airways Express. Cargo operations have increased at the airport in recent years.

In 2017, the airport became the first in the country to reopen access to the post-security terminal for individuals who are not flying, as long as they can pass through security, after the federal government lifted restrictions put in place after 9/11. In 2021, the airport became the first in the world with its own microgrid, which provides power to the entire airport with natural gas and solar power.

An all-new landside terminal opened in November 2025, along with renovations to the airside terminal. First announced in 2017 and delayed due to the COVID-19 pandemic, construction began in 2021. Officials emphasized that the renovations would make the airport more suited to Pittsburgh, rather than to US Airways. The project costs ballooned from a planned US$1.1 billion to US$1.7 billion, funded by a mix of revenue sources including airline fees, federal tax dollars, and other airport revenue from parking and concessions.

== History ==
=== First terminal (1952–1992) ===
==== Construction ====
Until the beginning of World War II, Moon Township was mostly a rural agricultural area. It was not considered a suburb of downtown Pittsburgh as it was too distant. It was served solely by Pittsburgh-based state and federal services and media. In the early 1920s, John A. Bell of Carnegie purchased a number of small farms in Moon and established a commercial dairy farm on his 1,900 acres (8 km^{2}) of land. He was bought out by Edward E. Rieck and his wife, and C.F. Nettrour, owners of the established Rieck's Dairy. They doubled the number of cattle at the farm.

Around 1940, the federal government, through the Works Progress Administration (WPA), determined that the Pittsburgh area needed a military airport to defend the industrial wealth of the area and to provide a training base and stop-over facility. The administration of President Franklin D. Roosevelt was continuing to invest in infrastructure across the country in the waning years of the Great Depression, before the US entered World War II, which had started in 1939. The agricultural expanses of Moon Township were attractive to airport planners in the city. The Civil Aeronautics Administration proposed $2.6 million to the county for a $6 million field in August 1941 ($56.9 million and $131 million present day dollars). The county bought the Bell Farm, and federal agencies began construction of the runways on April 20, 1942, after the US had entered the war.

In 1944, Allegheny County officials proposed to expand the military airport with the addition of a commercial passenger terminal to relieve the Allegheny County Airport, which was built in 1926 and was becoming too small. Ground was broken on the new passenger terminal on July 18, 1946. The new terminal would eventually cost $33 million ($400 million present day dollars) and was built entirely by Pittsburgh-area companies. The new airport, christened as Greater Pittsburgh Airport opened on May 31, 1952. The first flight was on June 3, 1952. In its first full year of operation in 1953, more than 1.4 million passengers used the terminal. "Greater Pitt" was then considered modern and spacious. The airport terminal was the largest in the United States, second only to Idlewild Airport's (now JFK Airport) in New York when it was completed five years later. The airport's capacity is one of its most valuable assets.

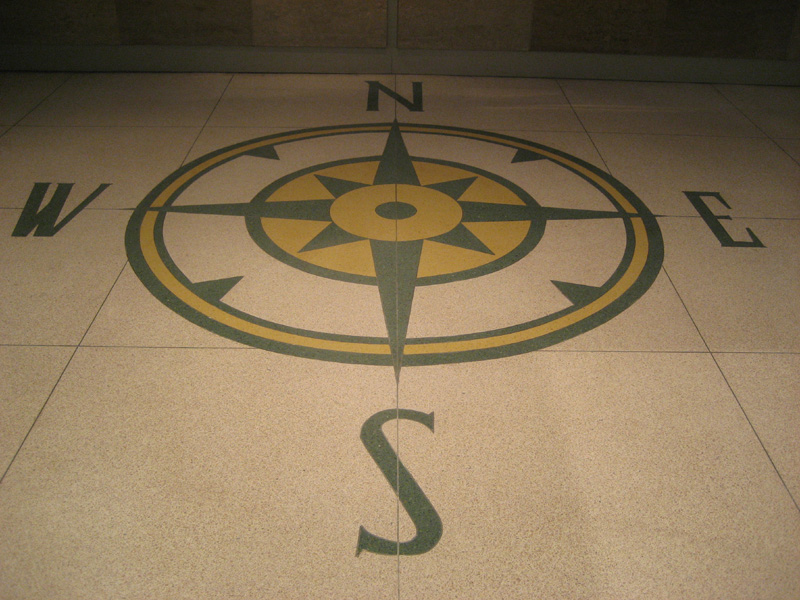
A replica of PIT's original terrazzo compass located in the new main terminal

The airport was designed by local architect Joseph W. Hoover. One of the features of his style is the use of simple, exposed concrete, steel, and glass materials. The terminal building was constructed in "stepped" levels: the first floor extended farther than the second, the second floor extended farther than the third, etc. Such a design meant that the uncovered roof of the lower level could be an observation deck. In addition to the observation decks, the rounded "Horizon Room" was on the fourth floor with a commanding view of the airport. The interior of the terminal building was in the contemporary International Style, as was the exterior. One of the memorable features of the lobby was the large compass laid in the floor with green and yellow-orange terrazzo. A mobile by Alexander Calder was another decorative feature of the lobby. The mobile hangs in the center core of the new airside terminal. A re-creation of the compass was installed in the new terminal at an exhibit dedicated to old "Greater Pitt".

==== Operations ====
The first five airlines of the Greater Pittsburgh Airport were Trans World Airlines (TWA), Capital Airlines (later part of United), Northwest, All American (later Allegheny Airlines, then USAir, and finally US Airways), and Eastern Airlines. The April 1957 Airline Guide shows 58 weekday departures on Capital, 54 TWA, 18 Allegheny, 8 United, 7 Eastern, 4 Northwest, 3 American and 2 Lake Central. The first jets in service at Pittsburgh were TWA 707s on a Los Angeles-Chicago-Pittsburgh loop in summer 1959.

The 1956 diagram shows runway 10/28 7500 ft, 5/23 5766 ft and 14/32 5965 ft. The longest runway was still 7500 ft when jets started in 1959 but was soon extended to 8000 ft. The 10500-ft runway 10L was added by 1965.

In 1959, the east dock was added to the terminal. On July 1, 1968, international airport status was obtained with the dedication of the first customs office at the complex. Ground was broken for the International Wing, west of the original terminal building, in 1970. It opened in 1972 to accommodate federal inspection services; international flights (Nordair 737s to Canada) began in 1971. The airport expanded as load increased. In 1972, rotundas were added to the end of each dock to allow more gates. In 1972, upon the opening of the international arrivals building, the airport was renamed Greater Pittsburgh International Airport. In the later 1970s growth in regional air travel created a need for more gates. In 1980 the South East Dock was opened. Even with these expansions, the terminal was too small.

Greater Pittsburgh Airport circa 1977

From the 1960s to about 1985, TWA operated a small hub at Pittsburgh. The carrier introduced service to London's Gatwick Airport on a Lockheed L-1011 TriStar in 1981. This was the first route from Pittsburgh to Europe. It lasted four months; TWA stated that too few passengers were traveling in first class, rendering the service unprofitable. In May 1985, British Airways started a link to London's Heathrow Airport via Washington, D.C., using Boeing 747s. Two days before the maiden flight, the airline had sent one of its Concordes to Pittsburgh to celebrate the launch of the route. USAir inaugurated a link to Frankfurt in 1990. The flight aboard Boeing 767s benefited the various West German companies that had offices in the city.

=== Second terminal (1992–2025) ===
==== US Airways hub ====
US Airways (previously known as USAir until 1997) had a major presence in Pittsburgh since they began passenger service in 1949. As the company grew nationally and acquired several airlines, they kept their operations and maintenance base in Pittsburgh and the airport was a major hub for the airline. A new terminal was discussed as early as 1969 but tabled in favor of expanding the existing terminal. The Airline Deregulation Act led to an explosion in passenger traffic, and Pittsburgh was the anchor of USAir's hub and spoke system. Passenger traffic in Pittsburgh grew from 11.5 million in 1980 to 17.7 million in 1987. The huge increases strained capacity at the existing airport, which had 53 gates, 33 of which were occupied by USAir. In 1988, USAir departures accounted for 86% of all operations at the airport.

USAir and Allegheny County Airport Authority agreed on a massive expansion, called the Midfield Terminal Project, which broke ground in 1987 with financial backing from USAir and cost $1 billion. The new airport was split into an airside terminal containing the gates and a landside terminal for ticket counters, security, and baggage claim. The split design would allow for potential expansion to the west side of the airside terminal, and the two buildings were connected via an underground tram. The airside terminal was built for 76 total gates configured in an X-shape to accommodate the largest number of aircraft and to ensure the farthest walk distance between any two gates would take no more than 15 minutes. In addition to the main airside and landside terminals, to the west of the landside terminal a separate commuter terminal was constructed for small planes on short routes (which later became the alternate security checkpoint). The old terminal would be kept until 1999 to house remaining operations offices.

On October 1, 1992, the new terminal opened to rave reviews, dubbed the "airport of the future" by The New York Times. The new terminal had numerous innovative features, including a cutting-edge underground tram and an AirMall, with more than 100 retailers and eateries. The AirMall was open to local residents who were not flying and tenants were required to abide by "street pricing", prohibiting them from charging more for items or food than they did at locations outside the airport. The new landside/airside design construction eliminated the need for connecting passengers to go through security more than once. The airport was equipped to handle up to 35 million passengers per year. The modern and innovative Pittsburgh airport became a model for other airports around the world. Its design simplified aircraft movement on the airfield and enabled easy pedestrian traffic to the gates.

USAir expanded operations with the new airport, and by 1995 they had nonstops from PIT to 91 airports, plus 28 more on USAir Express, and occupied 53 of 76 gates. In 1997 the airport handled almost 21 million passengers, more than any previous year.

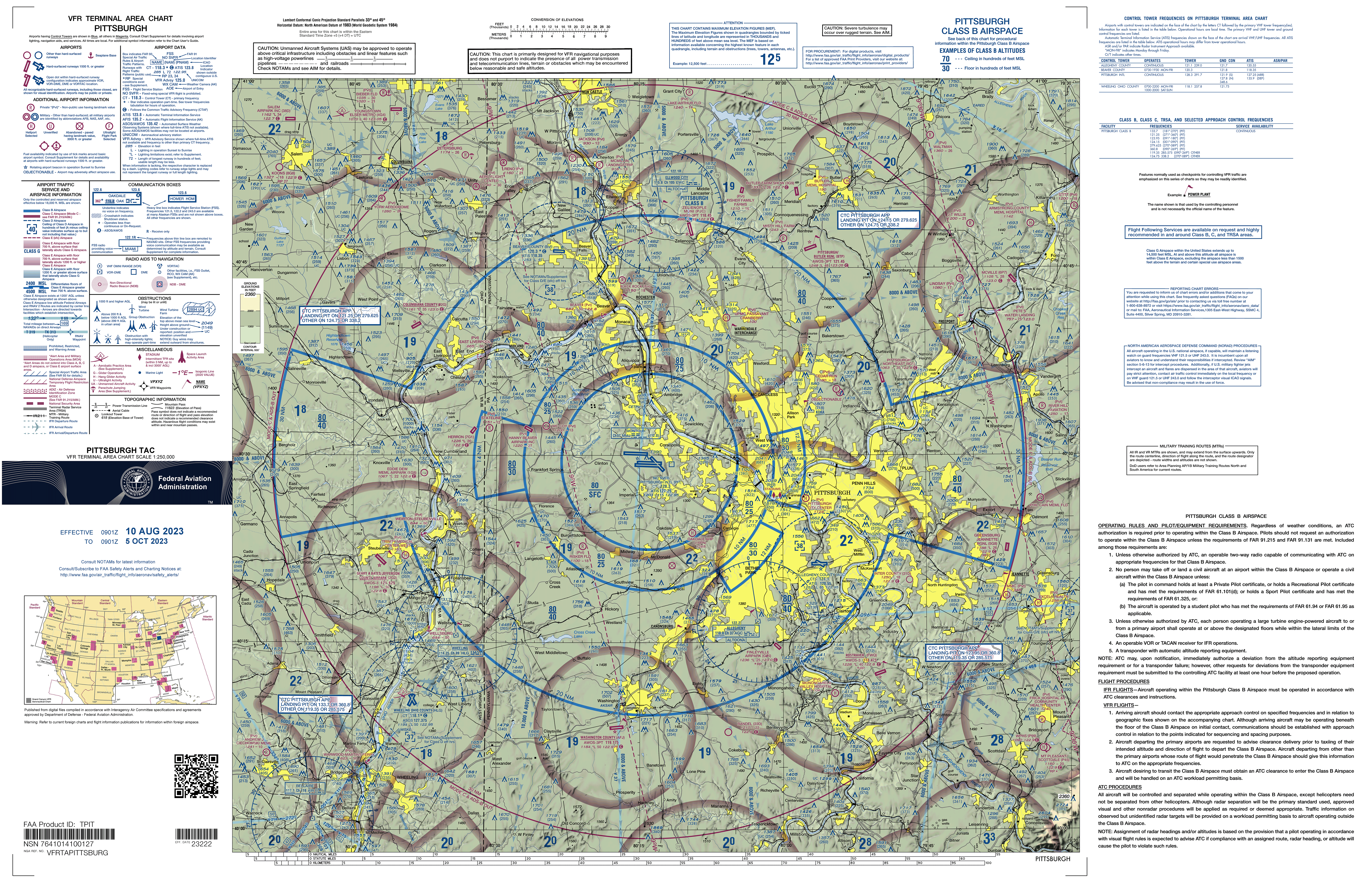
A terminal area chart showing Pittsburgh International Airport, a Class B airport, and its surrounding areas and flying restrictions

In August 2001, the airport had its busiest month ever with 2 million passengers and an average of 633 daily flights, and was on track for 2001 to be its busiest year ever. Then the September 11 attacks harmed the aviation industry, and US Airways in particular, setting in motion the decline of Pittsburgh as a hub. US Airways began slashing jobs a week after the attacks and filed for chapter 11 bankruptcy reorganization in 2002. High operating costs at the airport put the US Airways hub in Pittsburgh at a serious disadvantage. By 2003, US Airways was reported to be running a $40 million loss per year ($70 million present day dollars) operating its hub at Pittsburgh, while also paying roughly 80% of the new airport's $673 million debt ($1.18 billion present day dollars) stemming from its requested construction of the new terminals.

Just before emerging from bankruptcy in 2003, US Airways canceled its leases at Pittsburgh without any notice to airport and county officials, a move that former Allegheny County Airport Authority executive director said was "completely immoral and unethical" in a 2021 interview. US Airways filed for bankruptcy again in September 2004. Two months later, the carrier ceased service to London-Gatwick and Frankfurt, leaving the airport without any flights to Europe. After failed negotiations to lower landing fees and debt obligations, the airline announced in December 2004 that it would be reducing operations at Pittsburgh, shifting hub operations to Charlotte and Philadelphia. By the end of 2005, the airline had eliminated 7,000 jobs while continuing to operate roughly 200 flights per day, mostly domestic. A year later, US Airways had only about 170 flights per day to and from Pittsburgh, most being domestic flights.

Unrelenting flight and job cuts continued through the decade; accompanied by the airline's closure of Concourse E on the Landside Terminal and a portion of Concourse A on the Airside Terminal. In 2007, US Airways' market share in Pittsburgh dropped below 40% for the first time since the airport's expansion in 1992. By the end of the decade, US Airways had reduced to 68 flights per day, operating from ten gates on Concourse B, and one US Airways Club location. Numerous US Airways ticketing and customer service counters were abandoned, and 15 gates on Concourse A and B were sealed off from the rest of the airport. Pittsburgh's air traffic bottomed out in 2013 with 7.8 million passengers and 36 destinations.

Despite de-hubbing the airport, US Airways chose Pittsburgh in 2008 for their systemwide flight operations control center, after a bidding war with Charlotte and Phoenix led to state and local subsidies totaling $16.25 million being offered to US Airways to build the center at Pittsburgh. The center worked on emergency operations for US Airways Flight 1549 after it landed in the Hudson River. The airline closed the center in 2015 as part of its merger with American Airlines. (It was reopened as a 9-1-1 center for Allegheny County in 2019.)

==== Post-hub years ====
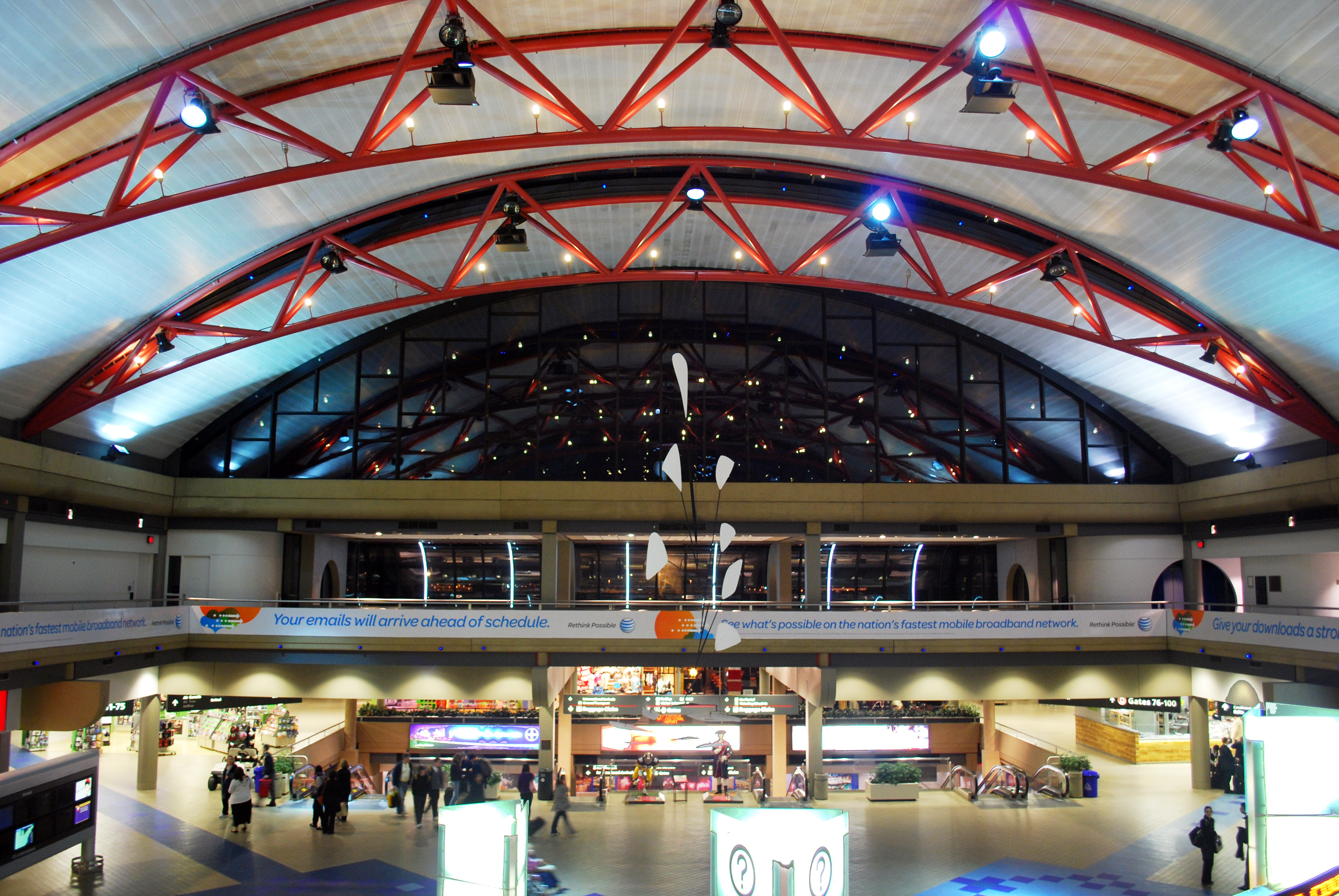
Airside Terminal, with the Alexander Calder mobile Pittsburgh on display in center

When the airport opened in 1992, only 20% of passengers started or finished their trip in Pittsburgh with the rest connecting; as of 2025, 95% of travelers start or finish their trip in Pittsburgh. The reduction and eventual closing of the US Airways hub allowed new low cost carriers to enter the market, creating more choices for local passengers. Southwest Airlines began service at Pittsburgh in May 2005 and eventually became its largest carrier. Southwest's entry is credited with stabilizing the airport and providing reassurance for other carriers to expand service in the post-hub years. Delta started the first route to Europe (Paris) in 2009 after nearly five years without service to Europe. The airport also expanded into other ventures, including the opening of a fracking well for natural gas deposits under its site in 2014.

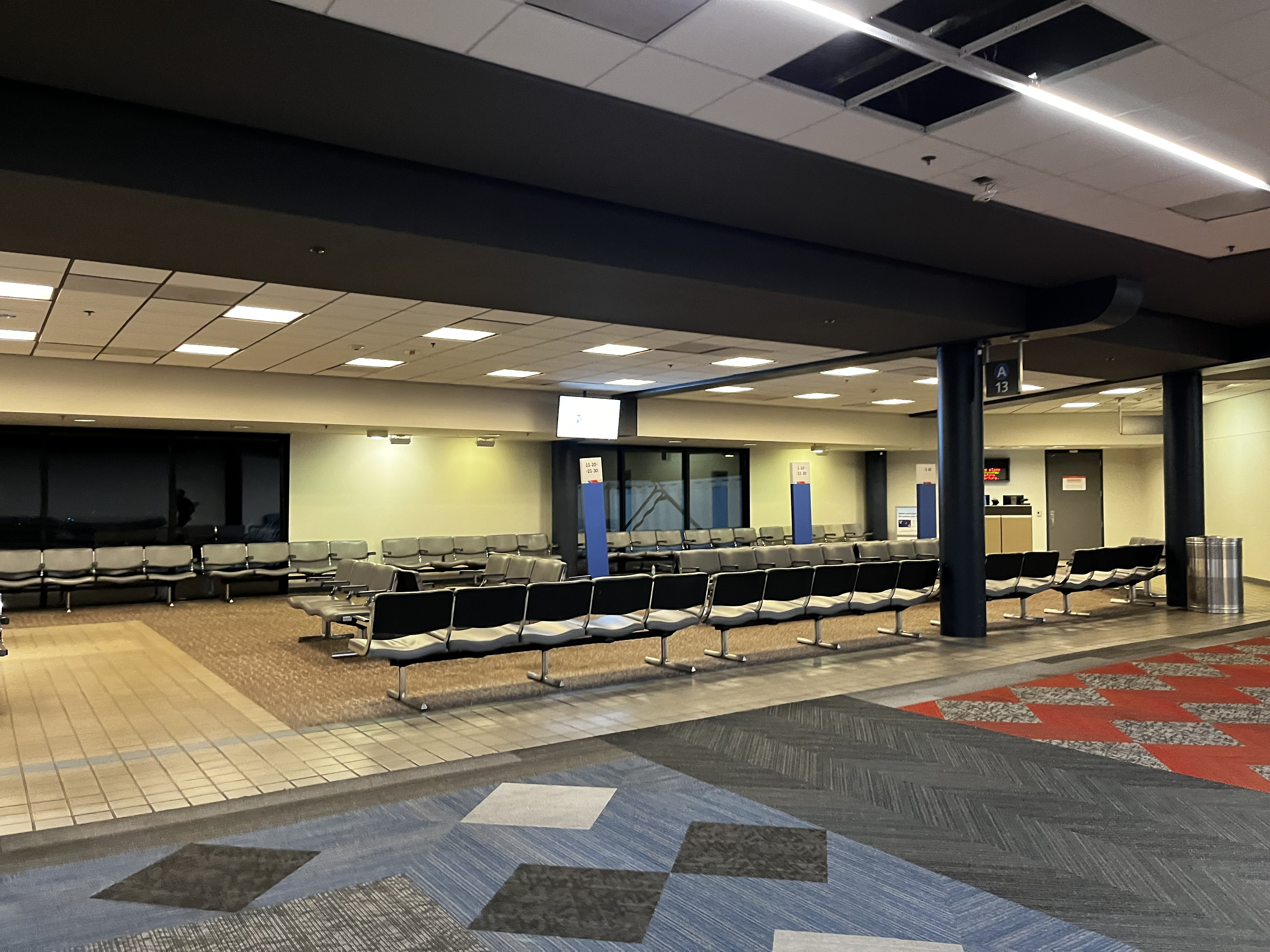
Boarding gate at Pittsburgh International Airport in July 2024

Allegiant Air commenced service and established a base of operations in Pittsburgh in 2015. Frontier Airlines re-entered the Pittsburgh airport in 2016 after a four-year absence. Spirit Airlines commenced service to seven destinations in 2017. Wow Air added year-round flights to Reykjavík in 2017. Wow left Pittsburgh due to financial difficulties in 2019 but Icelandair began flying to Reykjavík in 2024. Alaska Airlines began service in 2019 with a nonstop route to Seattle/Tacoma. British Airways began service to London-Heathrow in 2019 aboard a Boeing 787.

Regional carrier Sun Air Express established a base at the airport in 2014, connecting small cities in Pennsylvania and New York to Pittsburgh using Piper PA-31 Navajo planes under Essential Air Service contracts. Several of the routes had been previously offered by US Air. Southern Airways Express acquired Sun Air Express in 2016 and doubled down on building Pittsburgh as a hub, expanding to 10 routes to small airports and 34 daily flights using Cessna 208 Caravan aircraft.

In 2017, Pittsburgh was the first U.S. airport to be named Airport of the Year by Air Transport World. Starting in September 2017, non-ticketed persons were allowed to access the airside terminal and gates, similar to pre-9/11 policy. Pittsburgh was the first airport (since 9/11) in the nation to allow non-passengers to pass through security to dine and shop in a post-security terminal. Participants can sign up for myPITpass on the airport's website and must pass through the alternate security checkpoint before continuing through to the Airmall in the airside terminal. The airport became one of the first in the United States to use a new TSA system called Credential Authentication Technology, which phases out the use of boarding passes at TSA security checkpoints in favor of a stronger system that verifies passengers based solely on a government-issued ID.

As airlines grounded planes in the early months of the COVID-19 pandemic, Pittsburgh airport allowed American Airlines and Republic Airways to park nearly 100 planes on the airport's expansive tarmac. As airline travel rebounded, airlines added or expanded service at PIT. In July 2021, Breeze Airways began nonstop service to four cities and has since expanded to 10 destinations. In October 2021, Sun Country Airlines announced it would enter the Pittsburgh market with service to its hub at Minneapolis/St. Paul. In February 2024, monthly passenger counts at the airport surpassed pre-pandemic travel levels for the first time. Later that year, in June, the TSA recorded 970,000 travelers through the checkpoint, the highest count since 2005. The airport counted 9.95 million passengers in all of 2024, the highest passenger count since 2006.

=== Third terminal (2025–present) ===
==== Construction ====
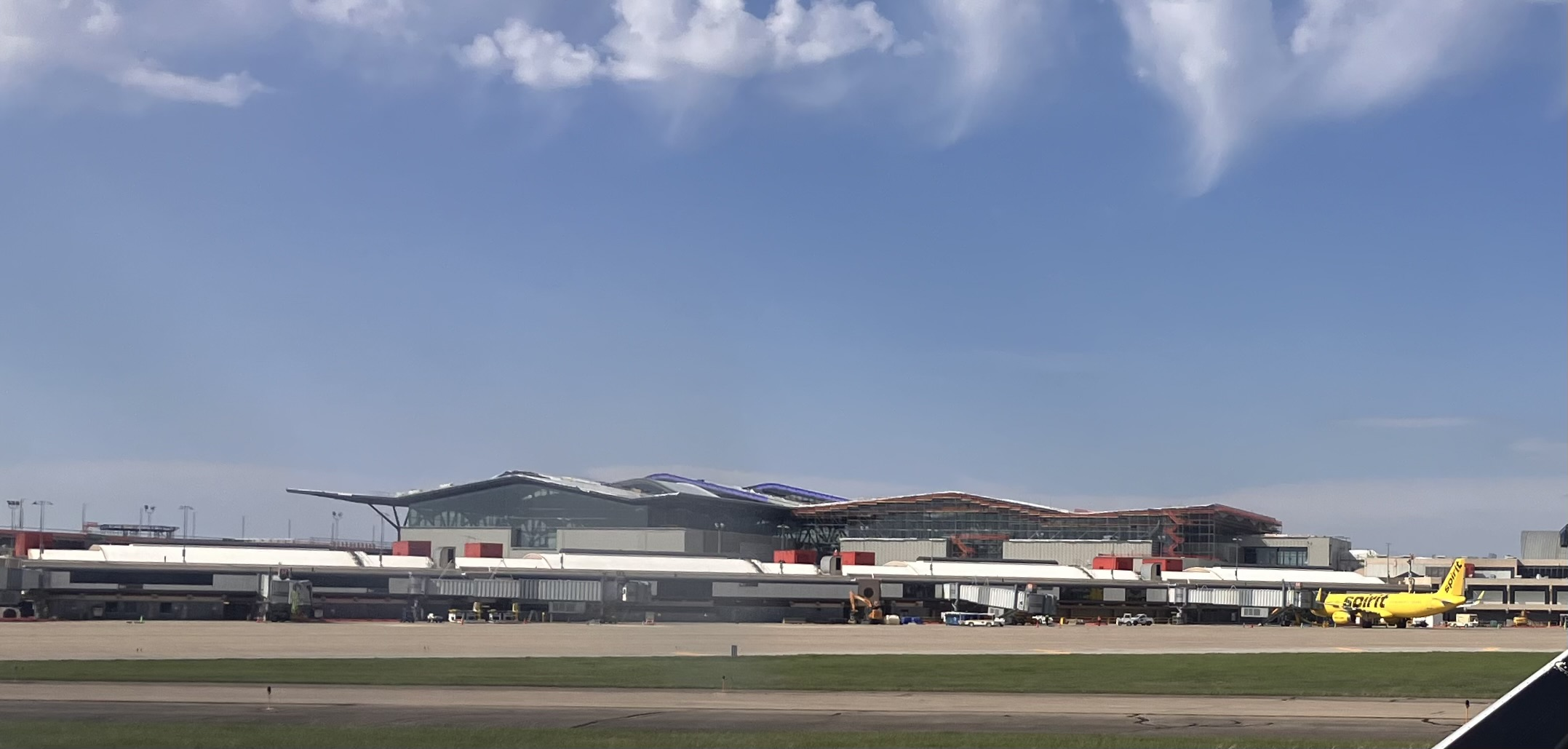
The new terminal building under construction

In 2017, Allegheny County Airport Authority officials announced a $1.1 billion plan to renovate and reconfigure the terminal complex, including a new landside terminal and a new parking garage. Under the proposal, the current landside building would be demolished if another use is not found, and the number of gates would be reduced from 75 to 51. A new landside building would be constructed between the airside terminal's concourses C and D, with new security and baggage facilities, a new international arrivals area, and many other amenities to serve passengers. The board chairman of the Airport Authority, David Minnotte, said, "The people of Pittsburgh finally get an airport built for them and not USAir". No taxpayer dollars would be used to construct the new facility, and it would be instead financed with floating bonds, grants, passenger facility charges, and revenue from natural gas drilling on airport property.

Construction was originally expected to begin in summer 2020 and the new terminal was slated to open in 2023. In April 2020, however, airport officials decided to delay the selling of bonds and start of construction due to the coronavirus pandemic. In February 2021, airport officials announced the project would begin later that year with an increased budget of $1.39 billion. The airlines serving the airport agreed to fund $182 million in construction site preparation work for the project. An additional $28.8 million in funding will come from the Infrastructure Investment and Jobs Act. Construction finally began in July 2021 and was originally projected to be completed in late 2024 for opening in early 2025. Total costs increased to $1.7 billion.

Airport officials emphasized the local flair of the new terminal. Building materials were sourced locally, including the steel, and around 90% of construction workers lived in the Pittsburgh region. The roof is intended to mimic the rolling hills of western Pennsylvania and the support columns are intended to resemble tree branches. The bridge and tunnel between the landside and airside terminals is intended to mirror the Fort Pitt Tunnel and Fort Pitt Bridge. An outdoor terrace is accessible to passengers even after clearing security.

==== Costs ====
The budget for the new terminal building was raised by the Allegheny County Airport Authority repeatedly, from $1.1 billion when it was announced in 2017, to $1.39 billion when it broke ground in 2021, to $1.57 billion after increases were approved in 2023, to $1.72 billion at the time of the terminal's opening in 2025, when it was still not 100% complete. Over 80% of the project was financed by the sale of bonds, with the remainder paid by passenger fees, federal grants, parking fees, and other sources. The cost of the new terminal raised expenses for airlines to $17.64 per enplanement, up from $9.77 in 2019, which some analysts expected would lead to higher fares for customers.

==== Opening ====
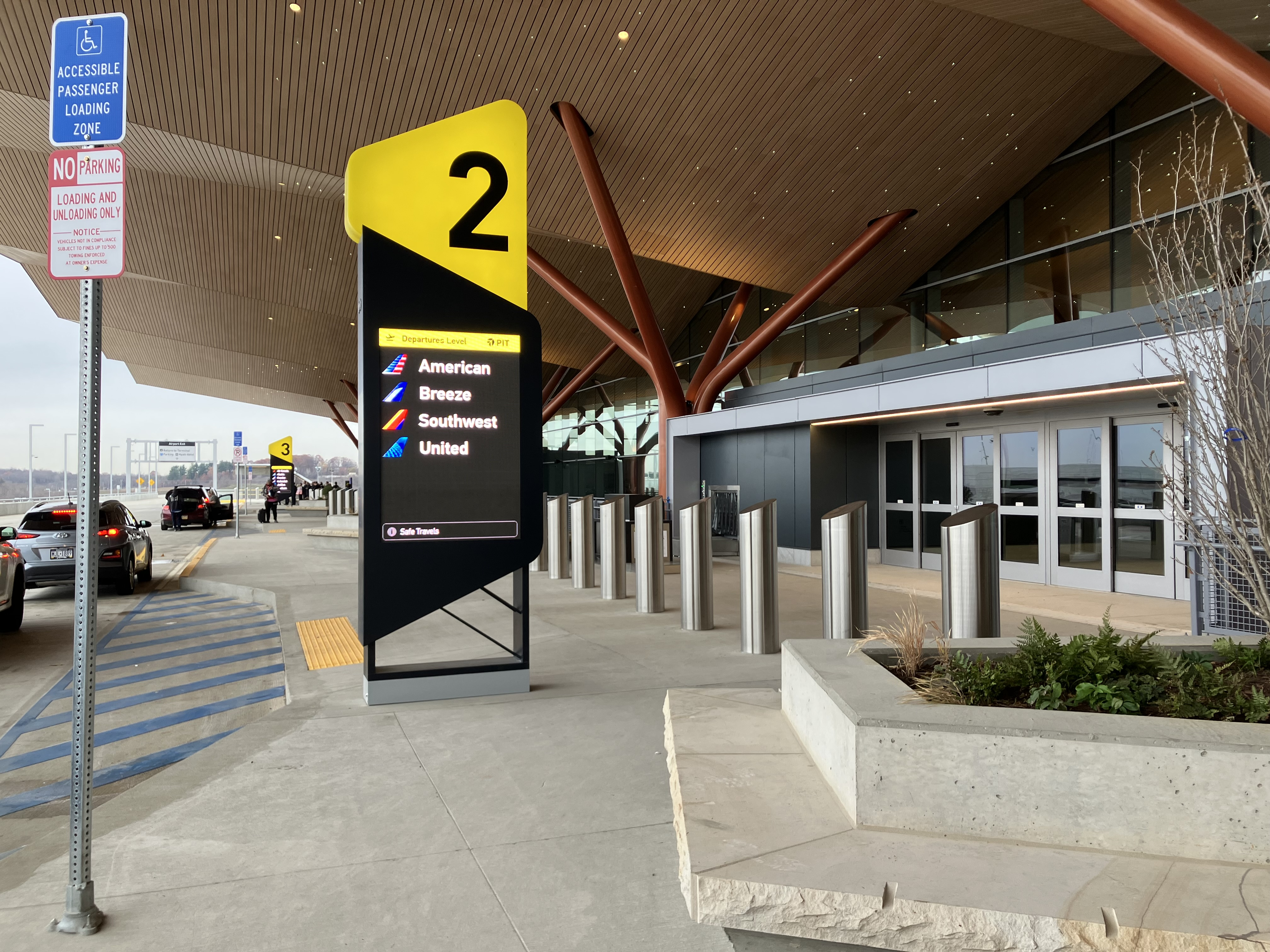
Passenger drop off zone of the new terminal building on the day of its grand opening, November 18, 2025

In preparation for the airport's projected opening in fall 2025, the airport authority held trial days with 2,000 volunteers who simulated different parts of the travel experience. An open house and a gala with Jeff Goldblum and the Pittsburgh Symphony Orchestra at the new terminal to celebrate its completion were held in October 2025. Additional renovations for the airside terminal are planned, including renovations to the gate areas, restrooms and reconfiguring of the A and B concourses.

Pittsburgh's new terminal building opened on November 18, 2025, ahead of the busy Thanksgiving and Christmas travel seasons.

==== Developments ====
In 2026, Aer Lingus began new service between Pittsburgh and Dublin for the first time, beginning in May 2026 four times weekly.

Southern Airways Express's operations at the airport dwindled as the company lost Essential Air Service contracts for flights between Pittsburgh and small regional airports. In 2026, the Department of Transportation declined to renew contract with Southern Airways Express for its last two routes from Pittsburgh -- Bradford Regional Airport and DuBois Regional Airport -- with service scheduled to end in January 2027.

== Facilities ==
The airport is partly in Findlay Township, and partly in Moon Township. The Air Reserve Station is in Moon Township.

=== Runways ===
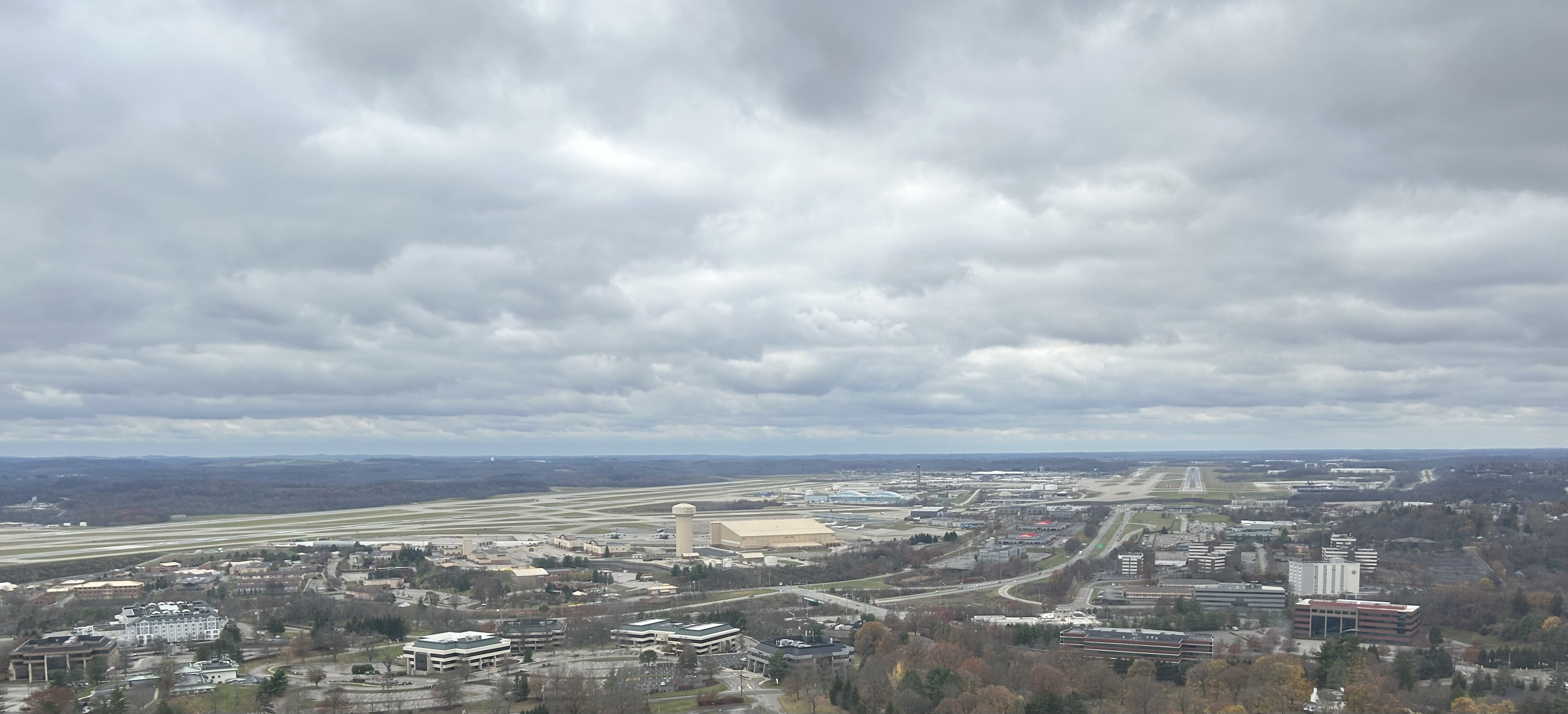
Approaching to land on Runway 28R, as shown on the right of the photo

PIT has a wide, open layout and four runways: three east–west parallel runways and a fourth crosswind runway. The airport's two longest runways are 11,500 feet (3,510 m) and 10,775 feet (3,280 m), allowing PIT to accommodate the largest airliners. Because of the development of non-aviation related business on airport land, PIT can add only one more runway (this number was as high as four in the past). With three parallel runways, simultaneous landings and/or departures can be performed in nearly any situation.

Runways 10L and 10R have Category III ILS (Instrument Landing System) approaches. Runway 28R is certified for Category I ILS and is authorized for SA (Special Authorization) Category I and II approaches as well. Runways 28L and 32 have Category I ILS approaches. All runways have GPS approaches as well.

During westerly winds, Runway 28L serves as the primary arrival runway, while 28R serves as primary departure and secondary arrival runway. Runway 32 serves as the main arrival runway for general aviation traffic. During easterly winds, runway 10L serves as the primary arrival runway, 10R is the secondary arrival runway, while 10C is the departure runway.

Due to PIT's size, location, runway length, and equipment, the airport handles a large number of diversions of flights bound for the East Coast, especially Washington, D.C. and New York, during inclement weather conditions. The airport's large runways, distance from coastal weather systems, and microgrid equip it to handle even the largest international aircraft. In recent years, Pittsburgh has handled several hundred diversions annually, with a record of 463 in 2018.

=== Terminal ===
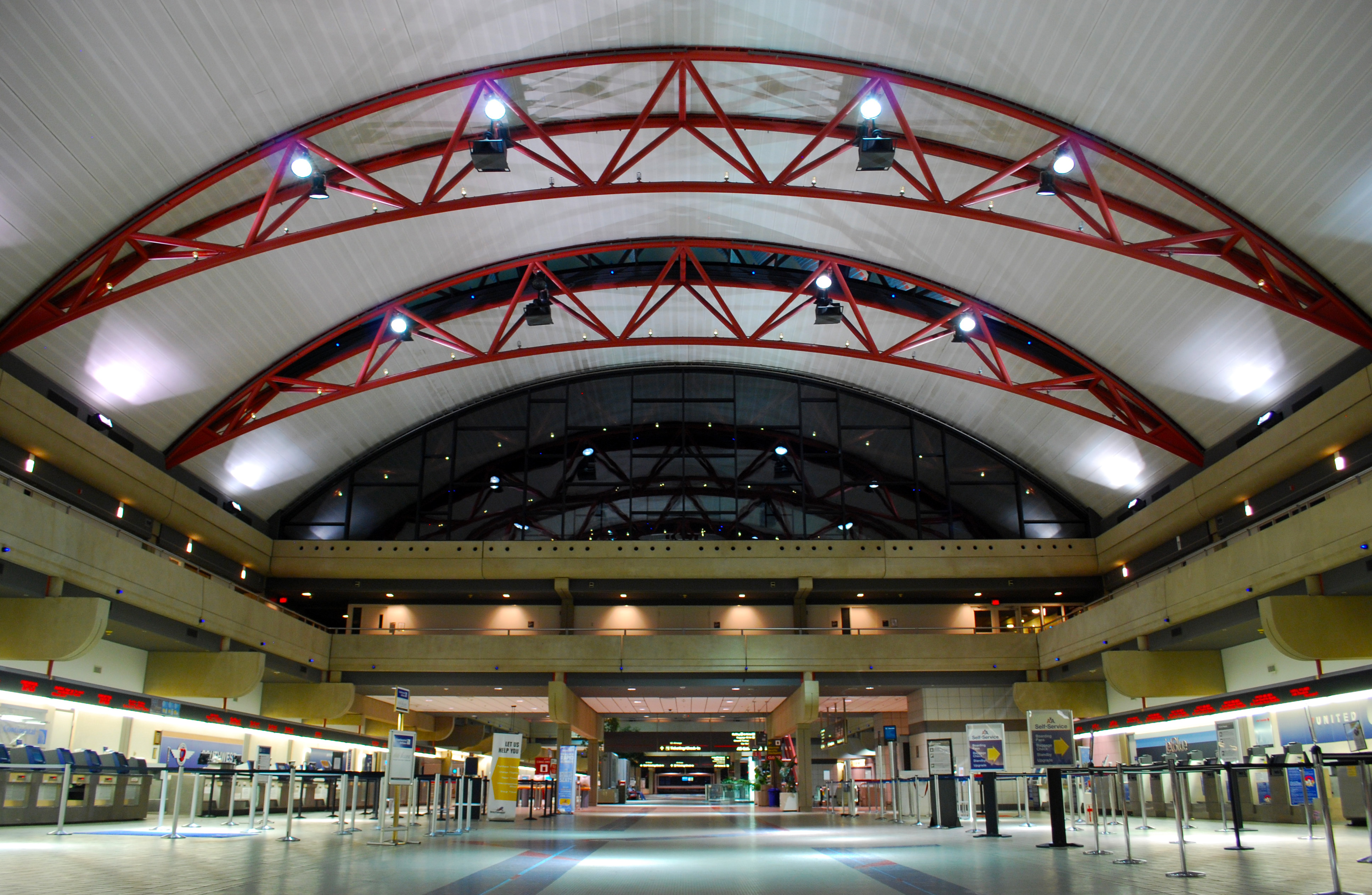
Part of the old Landside Terminal's ticketing area

The airport complex consists of one main terminal complex, which is split into the Landside Terminal and the Airside Terminal. Departing passengers first check in and drop off their baggage at the Landside Terminal. After passing through the security checkpoint, passengers reach the Airside Terminal, where all departure gates are located. Until the current Landside Terminal's opening in 2025, the Airside Terminal was accessed via people mover; it is now accessed via bridge from the Landside Terminal.

The Airside Terminal is shaped like the letter "X", and has 61 gates on four concourses:

- Concourse A contains 23 gates.
- Concourse B contains 25 gates.
- Concourse C contains 6 gates (International Arrivals).
- Concourse D contains 7 gates.

All international arrivals, except for cities with United States border preclearance, pass through Concourse C. American Airlines has an Admirals Club on the mezzanine level of the Airside Terminal. The Club Lounge opened in October 2017 in the beginning of Concourse C near the center core and was renovated and expanded in 2019. The airport also operates a free lounge for active duty military and veterans in Concourse C.

There was an AirMall in the airside terminal, operated by Fraport, with numerous retail stores and restaurants. It was one of the first of its kind in an airport and paved the way for similar shopping experiences at other airports. Tenants in the airport were required to charge the same amount as they did at non-airport locations. Before 9/11, anyone could shop in the airport, but it was closed to non-travelers after 9/11. In 2017, the AirMall was reopened to non-travelers who obtained a free access pass from the airport, but this access was suspended.

=== Ground transportation ===
The 28X Airport Flyer bus service is available to and from the West Busway Sheraden station, Wood Street station in Downtown Pittsburgh and at 5th Avenue/McPherson Street in the University District (Oakland) and several other locations per the Pittsburgh Regional Transit website.. Mountain Line Transit's Grey Line offers services to Waynesburg, PA; Morgantown, WV; Fairmont, WV; and Clarksburg, WV (areas south of Pittsburgh).

The PIT Airport is accessible by car from Exit 53 of Interstate 376 and the western terminus Pennsylvania Route 576, and within 10 miles (20 km) of Interstate 79 and 15 miles (24 km) of Interstate 76, the Pennsylvania Turnpike. Interstate 70 to the south and Interstate 80 to the north are both less than an hour away. Just beyond Interstates 70 and 80, Interstate 77 to the west and Interstate 68 to the south are within 90 minutes of the airport.

The PIT Airport offers on-site parking patrolled by the Allegheny County Police. The local Grant Oliver Corporation ran the parking from the airport's opening in 1952 until the Allegheny County Airport Authority unilaterally ended their contract to switch to national contractor LAZ Parking, which took over in October 2022. Grant Oliver offered a GO FAST Pass account to pay for parking electronically via E-ZPass, which was renamed to PIT Express Pass by LAZ.

A 3300-space garage and consolidated rental car center plus a 2800-space surface lot opened following the 2025 renovations. The existing parking lots from the old terminal were retained but cannot be reached by foot from the old terminal, instead requiring parkers to board a shuttle bus to reach the new terminal.

At the time of the closure of the second terminal that existed from 1992 to 2025 that included the closure of the Pittsburgh International Airport People Movers, parking was available in a garage with 2,100 spaces and a surface lot with over 11,000 spaces, split into three pricing tiers. Parkers could walk between the terminal and surface lots by foot through a moving walkway system, or board an optional shuttle bus from the farther lots.

=== Cargo area ===
Pittsburgh International Airport has a sizeable freight business, with a Free-trade zone of 5,000 acres (20 km^{2}), access to three class-one railroad freight lines, one interstate highway, and a location a few miles from the nation's second largest inland port and within 500 miles of 80% of the nation's population. Four cargo buildings provide more than 183,000 square feet (17,001 m^{2}) of warehouse capacity and over 450,000 square feet (41,806 m^{2}) of apron space. The airport has begun construction on a new 80,000 sq ft cargo facility with 17 truck loading docks and enough apron space for two Boeing 747 freighters to be loaded or unloaded simultaneously. The facility is scheduled to open in 2024.

Cargo traffic has increased considerably in recent years as airport officials have pitched Pittsburgh to cargo carriers as a more efficient alternative to clogged hubs like New York and Chicago. In 2017, Qatar Airways launched twice-weekly cargo service at Pittsburgh, backed by $1.5 million in subsidies. The effort was not very successful at first as Qatar failed to meet tonnage goals, and in December 2019 the route was suspended. However, Qatar resumed the flight in 2020 without any subsidies, and as of 2022 had increased operations to 3-4 flights per week. Several new cargo carriers began service to Pittsburgh in 2020 and 2021, including Cathay Pacific, SpiceXpress, and Amazon Air. In 2021, nearly 250 million pounds of cargo goods touched down at PIT, the largest figure since 2004 and a 30% increase over 2020.

The world's leading caterer for air and business, LSG SkyChefs, in 2007 chose Pittsburgh as its sole Western Hemisphere manufacturing facility. It expanded its customer service center on the cargo side of the airport by 20,000 square feet (1,900 m^{2}) and now employs over 100 people with the capacity of making nearly 25 million meals per year for distribution to flights all over the Americas. LSG SkyChefs cited the region's strategic location for air and truck transport to major suppliers and customers, as well as the airport's excellent record in maintaining and expanding capacity.

=== Microgrid ===
In 2018, the airport announced plans to construct its own microgrid, using natural gas and solar power as the primary power source for the airport, protecting it from power outages. In 2019, the airport authority awarded Peoples Natural Gas a 20-year contract to build, maintain, and operate the microgrid at no cost to the airport in exchange for the required land and an agreement to purchase the electricity for 20 years. The microgrid was completed in July 2021, making Pittsburgh the first airport in the world to receive its electricity entirely from a microgrid. The microgrid uses natural gas from the Marcellus Shale as well as solar panels. Most of the energy comes from natural gas; the 9,360 solar panels can generate up to 13% of its peak power. In its first year, the microgrid saved the airport an estimated $1 million in energy costs.

=== Neighborhood 91 ===
In 2019, the airport announced the development of Neighborhood 91, a 195-acre hub for additive manufacturing on airport grounds. It is so named because Pittsburgh has 90 distinct neighborhoods. The development was envisioned to have a complete end-to-end supply chain allowing products to be manufactured and finished in one place and then shipped around the world from the airport. The site was developed as part of a partnership with the University of Pittsburgh with 1.4 million square feet of manufacturing and office space. By 2023, the development had multiple manufacturing sites operational, including one owned by Wabtec.

=== Other facilities ===
==== Onsite hotel ====
A Hyatt Regency hotel is located onsite and is directly connected to the landside terminal via moving walkway. The hotel also has a ballroom and meeting facilities. As part of a pilot program, hotel guests were allowed access to the post-security shops and restaurants without an airline ticket as long as they could pass through security. In 2017, airport officials opened post-security access to all non-flying persons who could pass through security, including hotel guests. Because the new terminal opening in 2025 will no longer be walkable from the Hyatt, the airport reached a settlement with the hotel agreeing to cover the costs of shuttle bus service between the new terminal and the Hyatt.

A Sunoco-branded gas station is also located onsite. Both the hotel and the gas station draw power from the airport's microgrid.

==== Maintenance facilities ====
American Airlines still has a maintenance base at Pittsburgh, which dates back to the USAir days. American Airlines maintains and repairs all its Airbus A320 family narrowbody fleet at Pittsburgh. In 2021, it extended its lease at the airport for five years. In 2024, the airline announced an expansion of the Pittsburgh facility to 600 jobs by 2025, making it American Airlines' second-largest maintenance base after Tulsa International Airport.

Republic Airways has also operated a maintenance and repair operations base at the airport since 2006. Its current lease will continue until 2028.

== Airlines and destinations ==
=== Passenger ===
Airlines	Destinations	Refs
Aer Lingus	Dublin	
Air Canada Express	Toronto–Pearson; Seasonal: Montréal–Trudeau	
Alaska Airlines	Seattle/Tacoma	
Allegiant Air	Fort Lauderdale, Jacksonville (FL), Key West, Melbourne/Orlando, Orlando/Sanford, Punta Gorda (FL), St. Petersburg/Clearwater, Sarasota, Savannah, West Palm Beach; Seasonal: Destin/Fort Walton Beach, Myrtle Beach, Nashville	
American Airlines	Charlotte, Dallas/Fort Worth, Los Angeles, Miami, Philadelphia, Phoenix–Sky Harbor; Seasonal: Cancún, Chicago–O'Hare, Punta Cana, Washington–National	
American Eagle	Chicago–O'Hare, New York–JFK, New York–LaGuardia, Philadelphia, Raleigh/Durham, Washington–National	
Breeze Airways	Charleston (SC), Hartford, Myrtle Beach, Providence, Raleigh/Durham, Vero Beach; Seasonal: Cancún (begins January 7, 2027), Fort Myers, Greenville/Spartanburg, Jacksonville (FL), Los Angeles, Louisville, New Orleans, Norfolk, Portland (ME), Punta Cana (begins January 7, 2027), San Diego, Tampa	
British Airways	London–Heathrow	
Delta Air Lines	Atlanta, Minneapolis/St. Paul, Salt Lake City; Seasonal: Detroit	
Delta Connection	Boston, Detroit, Minneapolis/St. Paul, New York–JFK, New York–LaGuardia; Seasonal: Orlando	
Frontier Airlines	Seasonal: Orlando	
Icelandair	Seasonal: Reykjavík–Keflavík	
JetBlue	Boston, Fort Lauderdale, New York–JFK	
Southern Airways Express	Bradford (ends January 31, 2027), DuBois (PA) (ends January 31, 2027)	
Southwest Airlines	Atlanta, Austin, Baltimore, Chicago–Midway, Dallas–Love, Denver, Fort Lauderdale, Fort Myers, Houston–Hobby, Las Vegas, Nashville, Orlando, Phoenix–Sky Harbor, St. Louis, San Diego, Tampa; Seasonal: Cancún, Destin/Fort Walton Beach, Miami, Myrtle Beach, Panama City (FL) (begins June 5, 2027), Punta Cana (begins June 5, 2027), Sarasota, Savannah (begins June 5, 2027), West Palm Beach (begins February 11, 2027)	
United Airlines	Chicago–O'Hare, Denver, Houston–Intercontinental, Los Angeles, San Francisco; Seasonal: Washington–Dulles	
United Express	Chicago–O'Hare, Houston–Intercontinental, Newark, Washington–Dulles	

=== Cargo ===
Airlines	Destinations	Refs
Amazon Air	Fort Worth/Alliance, Lakeland	
FedEx Express	Indianapolis, Memphis	
UPS Airlines	Louisville, Philadelphia, Richmond	

In 2021, FedEx accounted for 50% of all cargo traffic at the airport, followed by UPS at 33% and Amazon Air at 5%. In 2024, FedEx's share dropped to 45% while UPS's increased to 33% and Amazon Air's increased to 15%. British Airways accounted for 3% of total freight in 2024 by hauling cargo on its passenger planes.

== Statistics ==
=== Top destinations ===
Busiest domestic routes from PIT (January 2025 - December 2025)
Rank	City	Passengers	Carriers
1	(Georgia (U.S. state)) Atlanta, Georgia	370,520	Delta, Southwest
2	Chicago–O'Hare, Illinois	300,590	American, United
3	Orlando, Florida	286,830	Frontier, Southwest, Spirit
4	Charlotte, North Carolina	247,010	American
5	Denver, Colorado	237,430	Frontier, Southwest, United
6	Dallas/Fort Worth, Texas	200,650	American
7	(New York (state)) New York–LaGuardia, New York	188,550	American, Delta
8	Boston, Massachusetts	168,830	Delta, JetBlue
9	Fort Lauderdale, Florida	144,320	Southwest, Spirit
10	Newark, New Jersey	143,520	Spirit, United

=== Airline market share ===
Largest airlines at PIT (February 2024 - January 2025)
Rank	Airline	Passengers	Share
1	Southwest Airlines	2,465,000	26.05%
2	American Airlines	1,533,000	16.20%
3	Republic Airways	1,100,000	11.63%
4	Spirit Airlines	939,000	9.93%
5	Delta Air Lines	912,000	9.64%

=== Annual traffic ===
PIT Airport Reports and Financials 2017–present
Year	Passengers	Total cargo +mail (lbs.)
2016	8,309,754	183,239,577
2017	8,988,016	182,062,152
2018	9,658,897	192,777,361
2019	9,779,024	197,334,846
2020	3,649,270	192,560,544
2021	6,354,770	249,399,374
2022	8,114,028	219,728,523
2023	9,196,564	190,499,602
2024	9,945,601	200,184,279
2025	9,848,440	191,367,975

== Military operations ==
The airport also hosts a United States Air Force base, home to the Air Force Reserve Command's (AFRC) 911th Airlift Wing and the 171st Air Refueling Wing (171 ARW) of the Pennsylvania Air National Guard. There have been military operations on site continuously since the first Air National Guard unit at the airport was formed in 1947.

== Accidents and incidents ==
Date	Airline	Aircraft type	Description
July 28, 2011	U.S. Army	Lockheed Martin "HALE-D"	An unmanned U.S. Army/Lockheed Martin experimental "HALE-D" airship that took off at 5 am at Wright Patterson Air Force Base crash landed from 32,000 feet at 8:30 am south of the airport between New Freeport and Gilmore.
November 22, 2001	Corporate	Learjet	Crashed after a rapid takeoff in which it went "nose-high" before the Pilot Flying (PF) lost control, both on board were killed.
September 8, 1994	USAir Flight 427	Boeing 737-300	Crashed on approach from Chicago O'Hare International Airport. All 132 people on board were killed. It resulted in the longest and most thorough NTSB investigation in history. It was determined that a lock occurred in rudder control that caused the plane to fall uncontrollably from 6,000 feet (1,800 m). Boeing has retrofitted every 737 because of the data gathered from this crash. The plane crashed roughly 10 miles (16 km) North-Northwest in Hopewell Township.
July 31, 1969	TWA Flight 79	Boeing 727	The plane was hijacked en route from Pittsburgh to Los Angeles International Airport by bank robber Lester Perry Jr. who was being transferred to a new prison. Though accompanied by a U.S. marshal and a correctional officer, Perry was allowed to go to the lavatory unaccompanied where he found a razor blade. He then held hostage a flight attendant and demanded to be taken to Havana, Cuba. Upon landing at José Martí International Airport he sought political asylum from the Cuban government.
April 1, 1956	TWA Flight 400	Martin 4-0-4	This was a flight from Pittsburgh to Newark. It crashed about a half-mile after taking off when the Captain and First Officer did not immediately correct a small engine malfunction/fire. Due to miscommunication and lack of focus it caused failure and a crash. 22 of the 36 occupants were killed.
February 19, 1956	US Air Force	Republic F-84F Thunderstreak	A Republic F-84F Thunderstreak crashed into a field behind Robinson's Trinity Church after an engine flameout during a training flight. The pilot, Thomas W. Sonnett, did not eject because he feared his aircraft would cause ground fatalities. After the crash, he was pulled from the jet and rushed to Ohio Valley Hospital, where he died from his injuries. He was 32 years old.
January 31, 1956	U.S. Air Force	North American B-25 Mitchell	North American TB-25N Mitchell 44-29125, on cross country flight from Nellis AFB to Olmsted AFB suffered fuel starvation northeast of the city and attempted to divert to PIT but ditched in the Monongahela River at the 4.9-mile (7.9 km) marker, west of the Homestead Grays Bridge. All six crew evacuate but two are lost in the 35 °F (2 °C) water before rescue. Search was suspended February 14 with no success – aircraft is thought to have possibly settled in submerged gravel pit area in 32 feet (9.8 m) of water, ~150 feet (46 m) from shore, possibly now covered by 10–15 feet of silt. This crash remains one of the region's unsolved mysteries.
December 22, 1954	Military Charter	Douglas DC-3	Ditched in the Monongahela River with 28 men on board after the pilot reported running out of fuel. 10 died.
July 13, 1950	Private	Beechcraft Commander	Two killed and one injured in a crash at Montour Country Club after engine failure.

== Other events ==
The airport has been the venue for a number of miscellaneous events. The U.S. Air Force has held several air shows at the airport.

In 1991, over 40,000 people packed the airport to greet the Pittsburgh Penguins when they landed at the airport after winning their first Stanley Cup championship.

== See also ==
- History of aviation in Pittsburgh
