= Pittsburgh International Airport People Movers =

Former rail line in Pittsburgh International Airport

Pittsburgh International Airport People Mover System
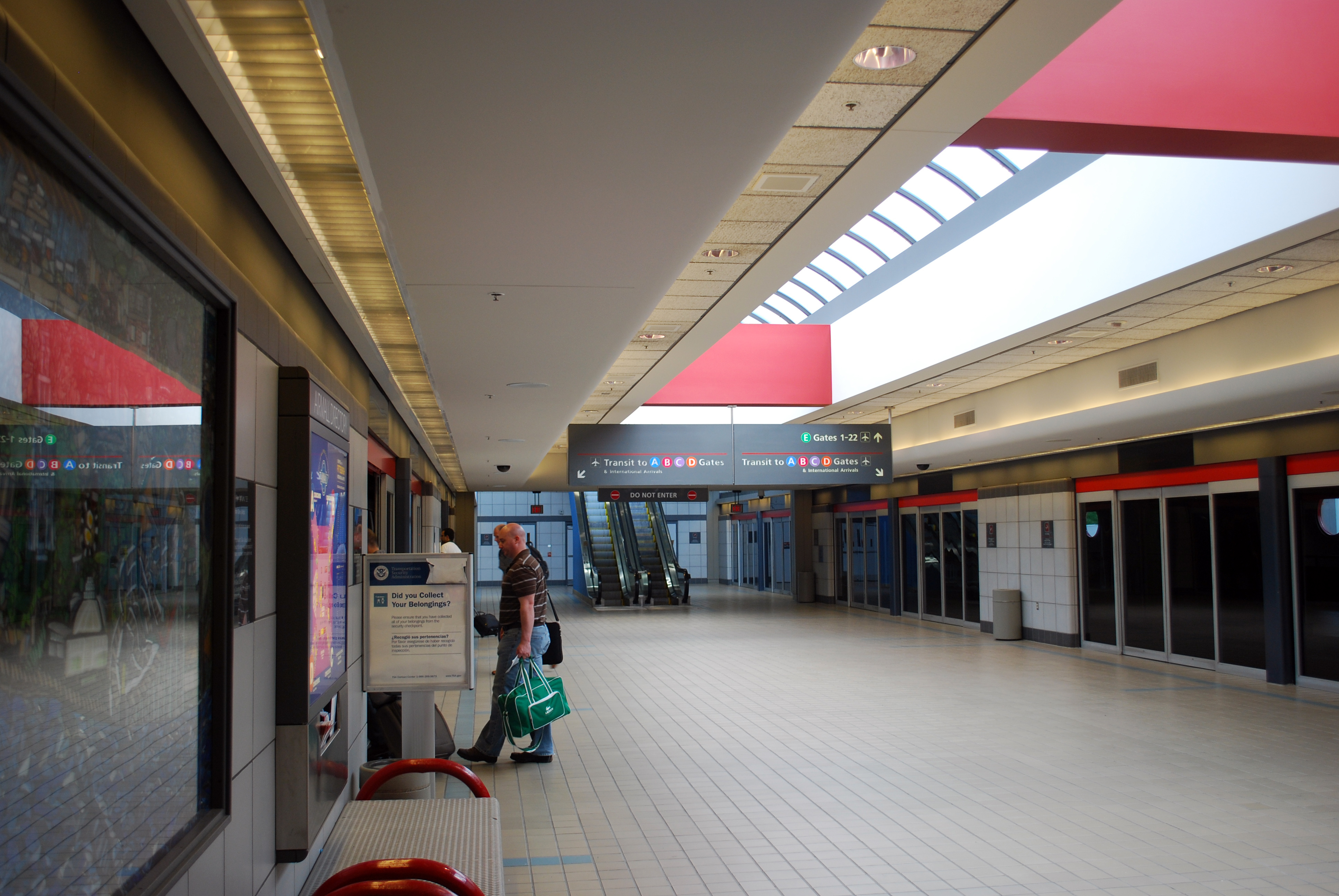
- Landside Terminal station of the People Mover system

Overview
- Other name: Pittsburgh Airport Tram
- Status: Closed
- Owner: Allegheny County Airport Authority
- Line number: 2 lines
- Locale: (PIT) Pittsburgh International Airport
- Termini: Landside Terminal; Airside (Midfield Terminal)
- Stations: 2
- Website: https://flypittsburgh.com/

Service
- Type: Automatic Transit System
- System: Pittsburgh International Airport
- Services: 2 stops (2 trains run both directions)
- Train number(s): 2 trains
- Operator(s): Alstom
- Depot(s): 1 (located at the Landside Terminal)
- Rolling stock: 3 cars per train (2 sets each)
- Daily ridership: 21,917.8082 (divided by passengers annually)
- Ridership: 8 million passengers annually

History
- Commenced: 1990
- Opened: October 1, 1992
- Closed: November 18, 2025

Technical
- Line length: 2,600 feet
- Number of tracks: 2
- Character: Underground guideway
- Minimum radius: Curves slightly after maintenance shop and near Airside Terminal (near ends of tunnel)
- Electrification: Central rail
- Operating speed: 32 mph (51 km/h)
- Signalling: Computerized
- Highest elevation: 1,202 airport elevation (below ground unknown)
- Maximum incline: 0°

The Pittsburgh International Airport People Mover was a fully automated people mover system at Pittsburgh International Airport in Pittsburgh, Pennsylvania.

Designed and installed at a cost of $14 million by AEG-Westinghouse (later Alstom), it operated in two parallel tunnels to connect the former Landside Terminal with the Airside Terminal.

== History ==
The Pittsburgh International Airport People Mover entered service upon the opening of the new Midfield Terminal on October 1, 1992, using Westinghouse C-100 vehicles (now known as Alstom Innovia APM 100).

To handle increasing passenger traffic, a $9.5 million improvement project was undertaken by Adtranz in 1999. A total of two cars were added to the people mover system; one was added to each train, turning each two-car train into a three-car train. The stations were then expanded to accommodate the extra cars. The project also included refurbishing of the original cars.

Beginning in 2014 and ending in 2016, the second, $11-million project to the tram system was done by Bombardier (now Alstom) as the system was beginning to age. Components like underframes, floors, climate control, and lighting were updated during this project.

A major airport remodeling project, unveiled in 2017, proposed eliminating the tram entirely, as the new Landside Terminal was planned to connect directly to the existing Airside Terminal. Construction began in 2021. When the terminal was completed on November 18, 2025, the People Mover was permanently decommissioned along with the landside terminal and removed from passenger service.
