= 2018 U.S. Air National Guard C-130 crash =

US air crash in 2018

2018 U.S. Air National Guard WC-130 crash
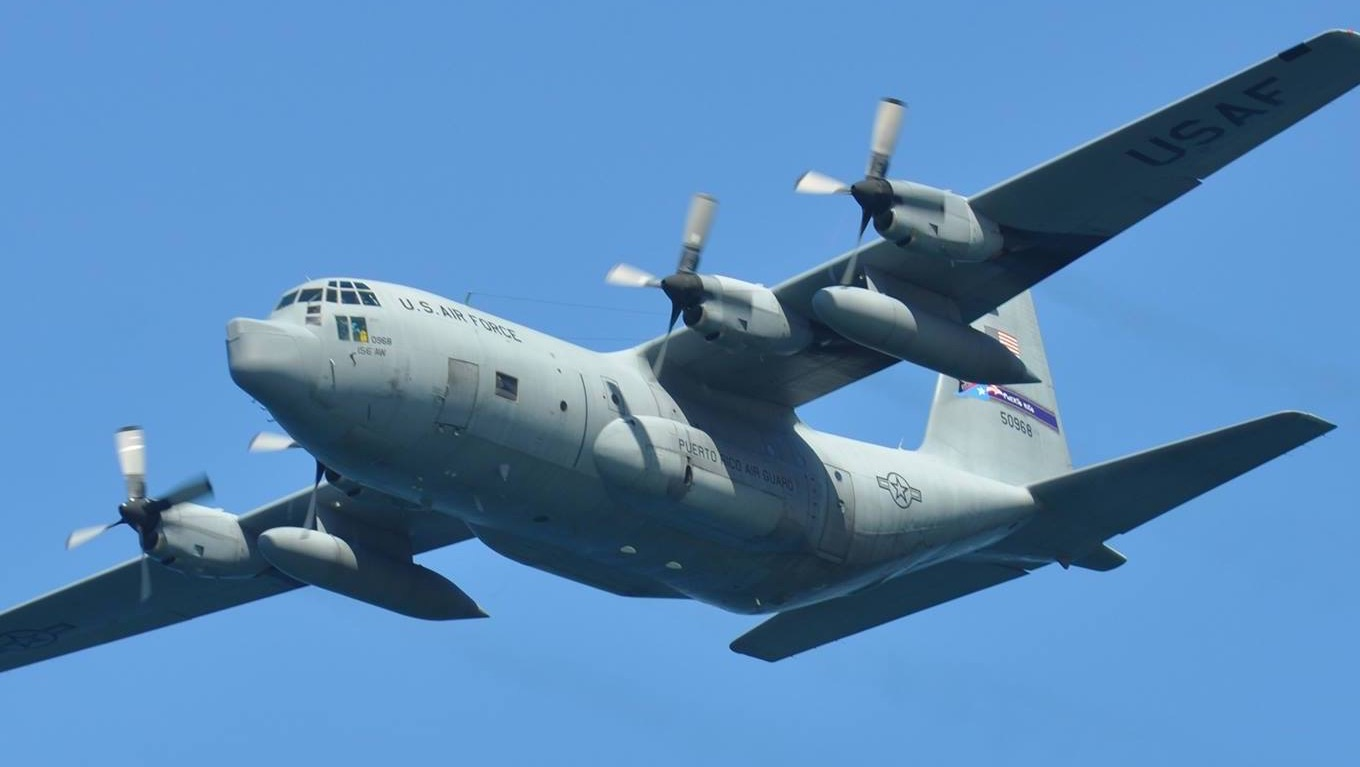
- 65-0968, the aircraft involved, photographed in 2016

Accident
- Date: May 2, 2018
- Summary: Stalled shortly after take-off due to engine malfunction and pilot error
- Site: Port Wentworth, Georgia; 32.143°N 81.177°W

Aircraft
- Aircraft type: Lockheed WC-130H
- Operator: Puerto Rico Air National Guard
- Registration: 65-0968
- Flight origin: Savannah/Hilton Head International Airport
- Destination: Davis–Monthan Air Force Base
- Occupants: 9
- Passengers: 4
- Crew: 5
- Fatalities: 9
- Survivors: 0

On May 2, 2018, a Lockheed WC-130H transport aircraft of the Puerto Rico Air National Guard crashed in the US state of Georgia, shortly after departing from Savannah Air National Guard Base (which is located at Savannah/Hilton Head International Airport). The aircraft crashed on Georgia State Route 21 at 11:26 local time. All nine airmen (five crewmen and four passengers) were killed in the accident. All nine were members of the Puerto Rico Air National Guard.

== Aircraft ==
The aircraft was a former Lockheed C-130E Hercules that had been ordered by the Air Force in 1965 and later modified to WC-130H standard and was approaching fifty years of age. The aircraft's tail number/Air Force Serial Number was 65-0968 and the Lockheed serial number was 4110. It had been converted to a WC-130H for weather reconnaissance operations, first with the Regular Air Force, and then with the 403d Wing of the Air Force Reserve Command. With the 403 WG's transition to the WC-130J, the aircraft had its weather reconnaissance equipment removed and it was reassigned to the United States Air National Guard to be operated by the 156th Airlift Wing of the Puerto Rico Air National Guard, the 156th having recently retired its legacy C-130E aircraft. Although the mishap aircraft was no longer capable of weather reconnaissance, it retained the mission design series (MDS) designation as a WC-130H. The mishap aircraft, and other WC-130H aircraft assigned to the 156th, were intended as an interim aircraft until the wing took delivery of newer, true C-130J-30 airlift aircraft that were planned to arrive in the coming months.

== Crash ==
The aircraft was being flown to retirement at the 309th Aerospace Maintenance and Regeneration Group, the US military aircraft storage facility at Davis–Monthan Air Force Base, Arizona. The aircraft was in its initial climb out of Savannah/Hilton Head International Airport, when it went into a left bank before losing altitude and crashing. Eyewitnesses reported that the aircraft appeared unstable after takeoff, and that one engine was shut down during the flight. The aircraft impacted on Augusta Road (part of Georgia State Route 21), resulting in a fire that destroyed the entire airframe, apart from the tail. All personnel on board the aircraft were killed, but nobody on the ground was killed or injured as a result of the accident. A video of the accident was recorded by a nearby surveillance camera.

The accident investigation was within the jurisdiction of the active duty United States Air Force (USAF), which assembled an investigation board.

== Aftermath ==
As a precautionary measure, the governor of Puerto Rico, Ricardo Rosselló, ordered all WC-130 aircraft to remain grounded until the conclusion of the accident investigation. The governor also ordered an assessment of the WC-130 fleet in the Puerto Rico Air National Guard. Additionally, commanders of the active duty USAF were directed to observe a one-day pause in operations, to review and identify potential safety concerns that may lead to mishaps.

A section of highway 21 at the impact site was closed immediately after the accident, and the Air National Guard provided funds to the United States Army Corps of Engineers for repairs and cleanup. Traffic was diverted around the crash site to adjacent road SR 307 through a temporary detour, until the completion of repairs. The closed section of highway 21 was reopened for public use on June 8, 2018.

The aircraft's wreckage was recovered and moved to a storage facility in Joint Base Charleston, South Carolina by mid-May.

== Investigation ==
The investigation carried out by the USAF found the root cause of the crash to be pilots error following an engine malfunction.

During the takeoff roll, engine number 1 (the left outboard engine) experienced performance fluctuations which went unnoticed until after takeoff. The engine power dropped from nearly 4,000 shp (3,000 kW) to under 300 shp (220 kW), causing the aircraft to pull to the left, nearly departing the runway. The investigation found that the takeoff should have been aborted but was not. Furthermore, the investigation determined that the flight crew had failed to adequately prepare for emergency actions, and the maintenance technicians failed to properly diagnose and repair the malfunctioning engine before flight.

After the flight crew retracted the landing gear, they identified that the engine No.1 was malfunctioning but did not perform the takeoff continued after engine failure procedure or follow the engine shutdown checklist, nor did they complete the after takeoff checklist. The flaps had been set to 50% for takeoff and were not retracted. The approved method of maneuvering a multi engine aircraft in such a situation is to bank the aircraft so that the malfunctioning engine is on the high-side wing. In this case, the pilot incorrectly applied both left bank and rudder, instead of banking to the right. At an airspeed of 131 knots (151 mph; 243 km/h), these incorrect inputs ultimately led to a left wing stall resulting in a total loss of control. The maximum altitude was at 900 feet (270 m), which was insufficient to regain control of the aircraft.

== See also ==
- List of accidents and incidents involving military aircraft (2010–present)
- Continental Express Flight 3407
- Turkish Airlines Flight 1951
- Indonesia AirAsia Flight 8501
- Air France Flight 447
