= Murder of Christopher Barrios Jr. =

2007 crime in Georgia, United States

- Born: Christopher Michael Barrios Jr. January 2, 2001; Brunswick, Georgia
- Died: March 8, 2007 (aged 6); Brunswick, Georgia
- Cause of death: Murder and rape
- Body discovered: March 15, 2007
- Resting place: Evergreen Memorial Cemetery

Christopher Michael Barrios Jr. (January 2, 2001 – March 8, 2007) was a six-year-old American boy who was raped and murdered by three neighbors in Brunswick, Georgia, on March 8, 2007. His body was discovered on March 15, 2007, just a few miles from where he had disappeared.

== Murder ==
On March 8, 2007, Barrios Jr. was lured by George Edenfield to the Edenfield family mobile home at the Canal Mobile Home Park in Brunswick where Barrios Jr. and his extended family lived nearby. He was then molested by George and his father, David, before being strangled when he allegedly threatened to tell his father and grandmother of the crime. According to the indictment, George and his 58-year-old father, David, sodomized the boy and forced him to perform oral sex while Peggy Edenfield, the 57-year old mother, watched and engaged in self-gratification. After killing Barrios Jr., David confessed that the three family members then continued to sexually gratify themselves before calling a friend to help dispose of the body. A week later, a state ranger found Barrios Jr.'s partially concealed body inside numerous black plastic garbage bags in a wooded area located a few miles away from his family home.

== Arrest ==
George, David, and Peggy Edenfield were all accused of Barrios Jr.'s abduction and murder. A fourth person, Donald Dale, originally charged with tampering with evidence and concealing a body, has since pleaded guilty to a lesser charge of lying to police. Superior Court Judge Stephen Scarlett accepted the plea and transferred Dale to a mental-health facility, and banished him from Glynn County. Peggy Edenfield testified in the case against her husband David and agreed to testify against her son George during his trial. In exchange for her testimony, Peggy avoided the death penalty; she was eventually sentenced to sixty years in prison.

== David Edenfield murder trial ==
2025 Mugshot of David Homer Edenfield

The trial of David Homer Edenfield (born June 4, 1948) began on September 29, 2009, and ended on October 5, 2009. The prosecution relied heavily on Edenfield's videotaped confession and his wife's testimony. Dr. Jamie Downs, the medical examiner who performed Christopher's autopsy, also testified to the extent of trauma found on the body and also the manner of death, which Edenfield's taped confession corroborated. Closing arguments began on the fifth day and the jury was sent to deliberate that afternoon. On October 5, with only two hours of deliberation, the jury returned with a verdict of "guilty on all counts." On October 6, David Edenfield was sentenced to death. As of June 2023, David Edenfield is still awaiting execution.

== George Edenfield's competency ==
On August 3, 2010, George Edenfield was ruled mentally incompetent to stand trial and was committed to a state mental hospital for evaluation. It will be the determination of psychologists and other mental health experts whether or not Edenfield will have a strong likelihood of becoming competent.

== Prior assaults ==
David Edenfield was charged in 1994 with committing incest with his daughter and pleaded guilty. He was sentenced to ten years probation.

George Edenfield was convicted of two counts of child molestation and given probation in May 1997. In September 2006, he was indicted for violating his probation by living less than 1,000 feet (300 m) from a park in downtown Brunswick and was ordered to move. On March 5, 2007, days before Christopher was abducted, Edenfield was sentenced to ten years probation.

A state law banning convicted sex offenders from living within a thousand feet of parks, playgrounds, child-care facilities, schools, churches, swimming pools, and school bus stops was passed in 2006; however, the school bus stop provision was blocked by a federal judge pending his decision in a suit claiming this provision to be unconstitutional. Ironically, the Edenfields moved into the trailer park where Christopher lived because of this law: sheriffs' deputies told George Edenfield that he had to leave his home near downtown Brunswick because it was too close to a playground.

== Soap opera photo ==
In October 2008, a photograph of Barrios appeared in an episode of General Hospital: Night Shift on Soapnet. In the episode, actor Billy Dee Williams receives a letter and photo from a son he abandoned. The show's producers have stated they are unsure how they got the photo and offered an apology. They promised to air a series of public service announcements in the child's honor. The Barrios family filed a civil suit against SOAPnet, which airs the soap opera, claiming invasion of privacy.

== See also ==
- Child sexual abuse
- Jessica Lunsford Act
- List of death row inmates in the United States
