= Savannah/Hilton Head International Airport =

Airport in Savannah, Georgia, United States

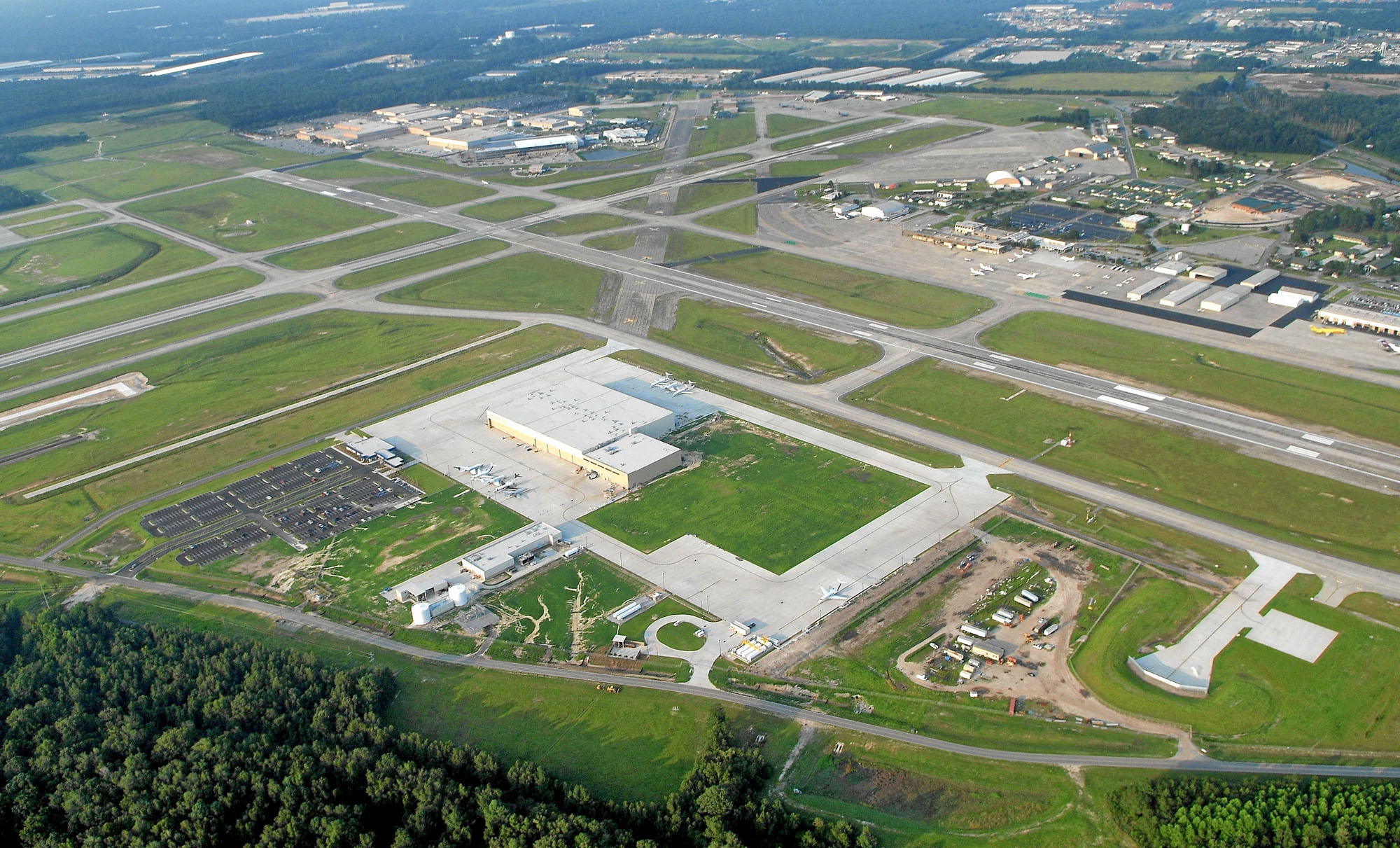
- Aerial view of SAV
- IATA: SAV; ICAO: KSAV; FAA LID: SAV; WMO: 72207

Summary
- Airport type: Public
- Owner/Operator: Savannah Airport Commission
- Serves: Savannah, Georgia; Hilton Head Island, South Carolina
- Opened: May 1994; 32 years ago
- Operating base for: Allegiant Air (ends November 2026)
- Elevation AMSL: 50 ft (15 m)
- Coordinates: 32°07′39″N 081°12′08″W
- Website: www.savannahairport.com

Maps
- FAA airport diagram
- Interactive map of Savannah/Hilton Head International Airport

Runways
Direction	Length		Surface
Direction	ft	m	Surface
10/28	9,351	2,850	Concrete
1/19	7,002	2,134	Concrete

Statistics (2025)
- Passengers: 4,234,531 ▲2.4%
- Aircraft operations: 116,034
- Cargo (tons): 11,829.10
- Sources: Airport website, Federal Aviation Administration

Savannah/Hilton Head International Airport (IATA: SAV, ICAO: KSAV, FAA LID: SAV) is a commercial and military-use airport in Savannah, Georgia, United States. Savannah/Hilton Head International provides travelers with access to Savannah, Georgia, and Hilton Head Island, South Carolina, as well as neighboring areas including Bluffton and Beaufort, South Carolina and the Golden Isles region of Coastal Georgia.

Owned by the City of Savannah and managed by the Savannah Airport Commission, Savannah Airport is located seven nautical miles 8 miles (13 km) northwest of the Savannah Historic District. The airport's passenger terminal is directly accessible to Interstate 95 between Savannah and the suburban city of Pooler. Its previous names include Savannah International Airport, Travis Field and Chatham Field.

This airport is included in the National Plan of Integrated Airport Systems for 2011–2015, which categorized it as a primary commercial service airport since it has over 10,000 passenger boardings (enplanements) per year. U.S. Customs facilities are on the field and the airport is part of a Foreign Trade Zone.

== History ==
The first Savannah Municipal Airport was opened on September 20, 1929, with the inauguration of air service between New York City and Miami by Eastern Air Express. In 1932, a city resolution named the airport Hunter Field. A trolley car was used as the first terminal at Hunter Field in the mid-1930s. In 1940, the U.S. Army Air Corps proposed to take over Hunter Field if a war started. While commercial airlines continued to use Hunter Field, the city decided to build a second municipal airport in response to the increased military presence.

The City of Savannah acquired a 600-acre tract near Cherokee Hill, one of the highest elevations in the county, and construction of a new airfield began under a Works Progress Administration project. Three 3,600-foot runways were constructed running north–south, east–west, and northeast–southwest. In 1942, before the completion of this new airfield, the U.S. Army Air Corps decided to take over the new facility and start additional construction to carry out its mission. It named the airfield Chatham Field and used it until the end of World War II as a bomber base and crew training base for B-24 bombers as well as fighter aircraft.

In 1948, Chatham Army Airfield was turned over to the Georgia Air National Guard and the airport was renamed Travis Field, in honor of Savannah native Brigadier General Robert F. Travis, killed in the crash of a B-29 bomber near Fairfield-Suisun AFB, California, and his brother, Colonel William Travis. To accommodate the airlines, Travis Field received a new control tower and an airline terminal in the former base theater.

In 1958, work began on a new airline terminal. In 1962, an additional extension brought the east–west runway's length to 9,000 ft (2,700 m). The jet age arrived in 1965 when Delta Air Lines introduced Douglas DC-9-10 flights. Grumman Aircraft opened a $7.5 million Gulfstream manufacturing plant at Travis in 1967. A new $21-million terminal building was built on the northwest corner of the airport in 1994.

A six-gate terminal built-in 1960 was replaced in 1994 by the current facility, part of an overall $74 million renovation of the airport. Although the airport had no direct international flights at the time, it was renamed Savannah International Airport in 1983, then Savannah/Hilton Head International Airport in 2003.

In 1992, the airport had international service with non-stop flights to destinations in the Caribbean and Mexico when Key Airlines was operating a passenger hub in Savannah. Key Airlines also operated non-stop mainline jet service to a number of U.S. cities at this time and from Savannah. According to the Key Airlines system timetable dated October 1, 1992, non-stop services primarily operated with Boeing 727-100 and 727-200 jetliners were being flown from the airport to Antigua (ANU), Aruba (AUA), Atlanta (ATL), Baltimore (BWI), Boston (BOS), Cancun (CUN), Chicago Midway Airport (MDW), Cozumel (CZM), Curaçao (CUR), Freeport (FPO), Montego Bay (MBJ), Nassau (NAS), New York Newark Airport (EWR), Orlando (MCO), St. Maarten (SXM) and St. Thomas (STT). In addition to these non-stop flights, a one-stop direct service was also flown by the airline from Savannah to St. Croix (STX). Key Airlines subsequently experienced financial difficulties and then ceased all flights in 1993.

The new 275,000-sq.-ft. terminal opened in May 1994 with eight gates (expandable to 19 gates). The project included new roads, a new aircraft taxiway and parking apron, stormwater ponds, landscaping, and a new interchange at I-95 for entry into the Airport (Exit 104) at mile marker 104. The total cost for the project was $68.5 million. It was completed one month ahead of schedule and under budget. It was designed by KBJ Architects.

A terminal expansion project was completed in July 2007, adding five departure gates (for a total of 15). A $35 million parking garage was completed in October of the same year, adding 1,700 parking spaces and uses an electronic program to alert drivers to the number of available spaces on each garage level.

International service was finally resumed in 2017 when Air Canada began seasonal service between Toronto and Savannah, which has since ceased to operate the route.

For the second consecutive year, the airport was named the #1 Best Domestic Airport in Travel+Leisure World's Best Awards 2022 as a result of a survey by its readers. Airport accessibility, shopping, check-in, security, restaurants, cleanliness and other factors contributed to the airport's top US rating. Condé Nast Traveler magazine ranked Savannah/Hilton Head International Airport the US #1 airport for the third consecutive year by its readers as well.

=== Graves ===
Some 3,680 feet (1,120 m) from the west end of Runway 10 (the main east–west runway), at approximately 32.128810°N 81.206909°W, are two concrete grave markers. A runway extension project placed the runway through a small family plot and the graves of the airport property's two original owners. Because the family did not want to remove and relocate the graves, the markers were placed on the asphalt runway. Runway 10 is thought to be the only airport runway in the United States with marked gravestones in it. Federal law generally prohibits the moving of a grave without the permission of the next of kin. In this case, two graves of the Dotson Family, the earliest grave dating back to 1857, were encountered during the construction of the runway. Since the next of kin could not be located, the graves were left undisturbed. Two additional graves are located off the runway surface.

== Facilities ==
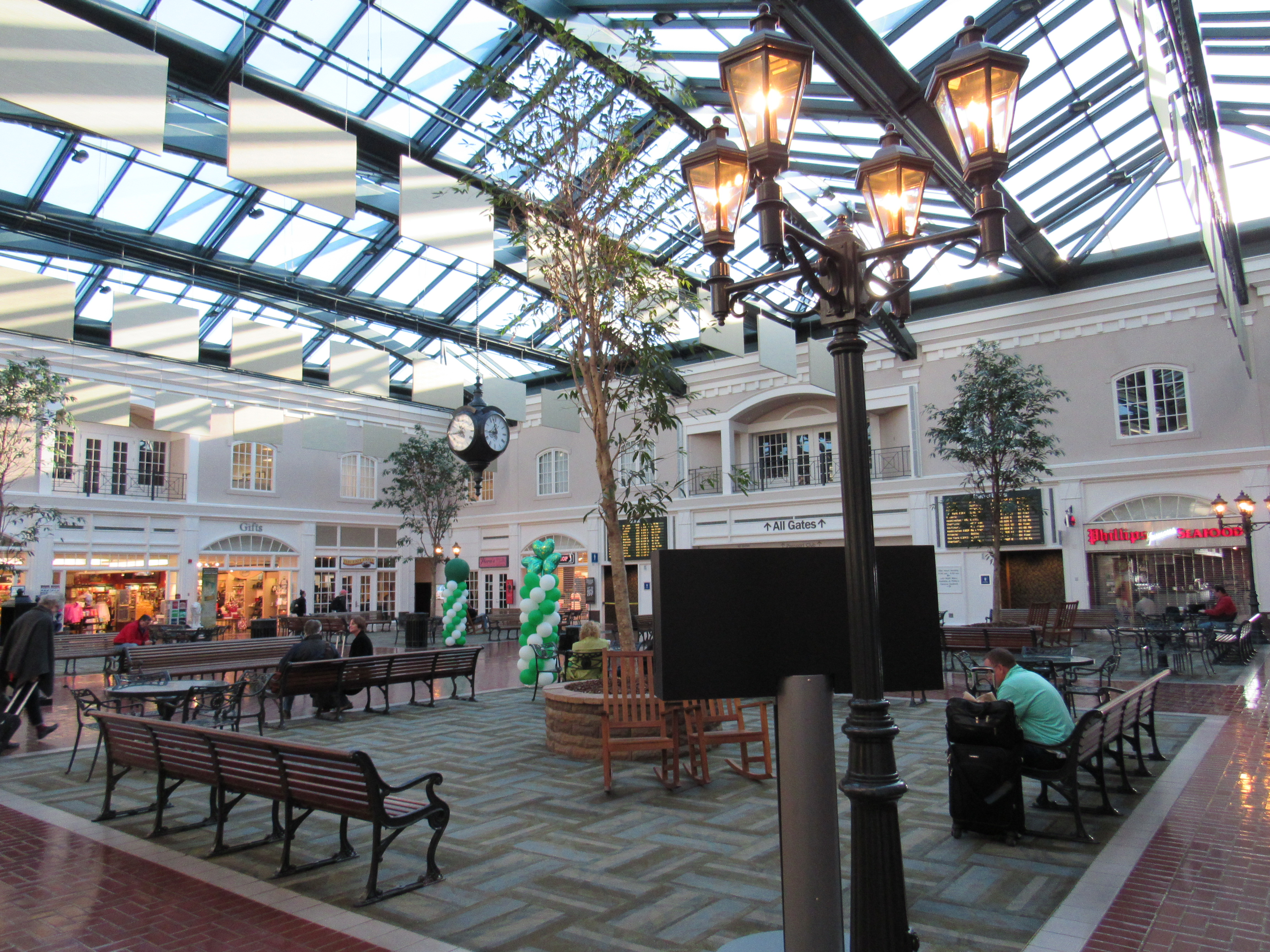
The atrium inside the airport

Savannah/Hilton Head International Airport covers an area of 3,650 acres (1,480 ha) at an elevation of 50 ft (15 m) above mean sea level. It has two runways with concrete surfaces:

- 10/28: 9,351 ft × 150 ft (2,850 m × 46 m)
- 01/19: 7,002 ft × 150 ft (2,134 m × 46 m)

=== Future expansion ===
To accommodate the rapid growth in passengers traveling through the airport, construction is currently underway to expand the TSA security lanes. Upon completion in fall 2024, there will be six TSA security lanes. Construction on an additional four gates is expected to start in September 2024 and be completed by November 2025. Construction is also expected to start in 2024 on two new surface lots for airport parking. Approximately $10 million in funding was confirmed in June 2026.

=== Military ===
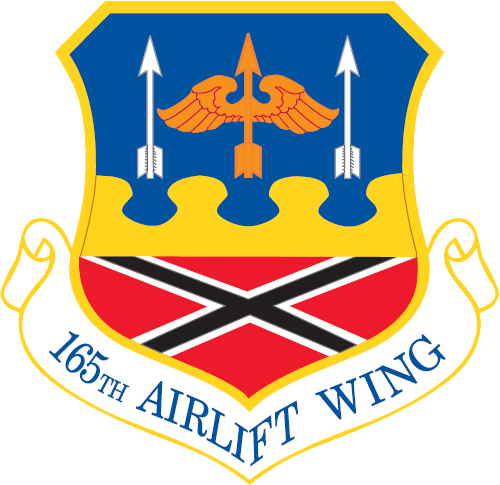

Also located on the airport is Savannah Air National Guard Base, home to the 165th Airlift Wing (165 AW) of the Georgia Air National Guard. The 165 AW flies the C-130J Super Hercules tactical airlift aircraft and, as an Air National Guard (ANG) unit, is under the operational claimancy of the Air Mobility Command (AMC). The 165 AW, including the collocated Georgia ANG Combat Readiness Training Center (CRTC) and Air Dominance Center, consists of over 310 full-time Active Guard and Reserve (AGR) and Air Reserve Technician (ART) personnel, and over 700 additional part-time traditional air national guardsmen (TG), also known as Drill Status Guardsmen (DSG).

Savannah ANGB has over 145 buildings and 239 acres of leased land in the southeast and northeast quadrants of the airport.

It is also home of the Air Dominance Center.

== Airlines and destinations ==
=== Passenger ===
Airlines	Destinations
Allegiant Air	Akron/Canton, Cincinnati, Grand Rapids, Seasonal: Appleton, Columbus–Rickenbacker, Indianapolis, Pittsburgh
American Airlines	Charlotte, Dallas/Fort Worth; Seasonal: Chicago–O'Hare, Miami, Philadelphia
American Eagle	Charlotte, Chicago–O'Hare, Dallas/Fort Worth, Miami, New York–LaGuardia, Philadelphia, Washington–National
Avelo Airlines	Seasonal: New Haven
Breeze Airways	Akron/Canton, Columbus–Glenn, Fort Lauderdale, Hartford, New Orleans, Providence, White Plains
Delta Air Lines	Atlanta, Detroit, Minneapolis/St. Paul; Seasonal: Boston
Delta Connection	Boston, New York–JFK, New York–LaGuardia; Seasonal: Detroit
JetBlue	Boston, New York–JFK
Southwest Airlines	Baltimore, Chicago–Midway, Dallas–Love, Houston–Hobby, Nashville; Seasonal: Denver, Kansas City, Pittsburgh (begins June 5, 2027), St. Louis
Sun Country Airlines	Seasonal: Minneapolis/St. Paul
United Airlines	Chicago–O'Hare, Denver, Newark Washington–Dulles
United Express	Chicago–O'Hare, Houston–Intercontinental, Washington–Dulles; Seasonal: Newark

=== Cargo ===
Airlines	Destinations
FedEx Express	Memphis
UPS Airlines	Louisville

== Statistics ==
=== Annual traffic ===
SAV Airport annual traffic and operations, 2005–present
Year	Passengers	Operations	Year	Passengers	Operations	Year	Passengers	Operations
2005	2,104,893	103,988	2015	2,027,262	88,691	2025	4,234,531	116,034
2006	1,932,593	102,928	2016	2,190,406	92,680	2026		
2007	2,029,410	100,009	2017	2,462,881	94,827	2027		
2008	1,969,965	94,306	2018	2,799,526	96,823	2028		
2009	1,650,383	95,206	2019	3,021,077	107,764	2029		
2010	1,653,302	99,787	2020	1,199,995	92,294	2030		
2011	1,612,348	90,326	2021	2,780,909	112,657	2031		
2012	1,612,090	90,326	2022	3,533,294	116,420	2032		
2013	1,642,088	84,958	2023	3,897,532	111,948	2033		
2014	1,916,561	85,090	2024	4,134,381	114,986	2034		

=== Airline market share ===
Largest airlines at SAV (August 2025 – July 2026)
Rank	Carriers	Passengers	Share
1	Delta Air Lines	926,000	22.38%
2	Southwest	608,000	14.70%
3	American Airlines	409,000	9.89%
4	United Airlines	385,000	9.30%
5	PSA Airlines	362,000	8.76%
	Other	1,447,000	34.98%

=== Top destinations ===
Top domestic destinations (August 2025 – July 2026)
Rank	Airport	Passengers	Airlines
1	Atlanta, Georgia	392,200	Delta
2	Charlotte, North Carolina	162,770	American
3	Chicago–O'Hare, Illinois	130,940	American, United
4	Dallas/Fort Worth, Texas	117,550	American
5	New York–JFK, New York	112,290	Delta, JetBlue
6	Newark, New Jersey	109,990	United
7	Nashville, Tennessee	95,240	Southwest
8	Boston, Massachusetts	94,970	Allegiant, Delta, JetBlue
9	Baltimore, Maryland	94,470	Southwest
10	Philadelphia, Pennsylvania	74,920	American

== Accidents and incidents ==
- On May 2, 2018, a USAF Lockheed WC-130H Hercules, assigned to the 156th Airlift Wing of the Puerto Rico Air National Guard on a military flight to Davis-Monthan AFB, Arizona, stalled and crashed after takeoff 2 km (1.2 mi) northeast of the airport on Georgia State Highway 21 due to the failure of the #1 engine and improper application of left rudder. All nine occupants were killed.

== See also ==
- List of airports in Georgia
- Public transportation in Savannah, Georgia
